= Archibald Knox =

Archibald Knox is the name of:

- Archibald Knox (designer) (1864–1933), Manx Arts & Crafts designer
- Archie Knox (born 1947), Scottish football manager
