= T. M. Lewin =

British menswear retailer

TM Lewin Shirtmaker Limited
- Type: Private company
- Industry: Clothing
- Founded: 1898; 128 years ago
- Founder: Thomas Mayes Lewin
- Headquarters: London, United Kingdom
- Area served: Worldwide
- Products: Shirts, Suits, Ties, Jackets, Knitwear, Accessories for men, Chinos
- Parent: Bain Capital (2015-2020); Torque Brands (2020-2022); TM Lewin Shirtmaker Limited (2022-present)
- Website: tmlewin.co.uk

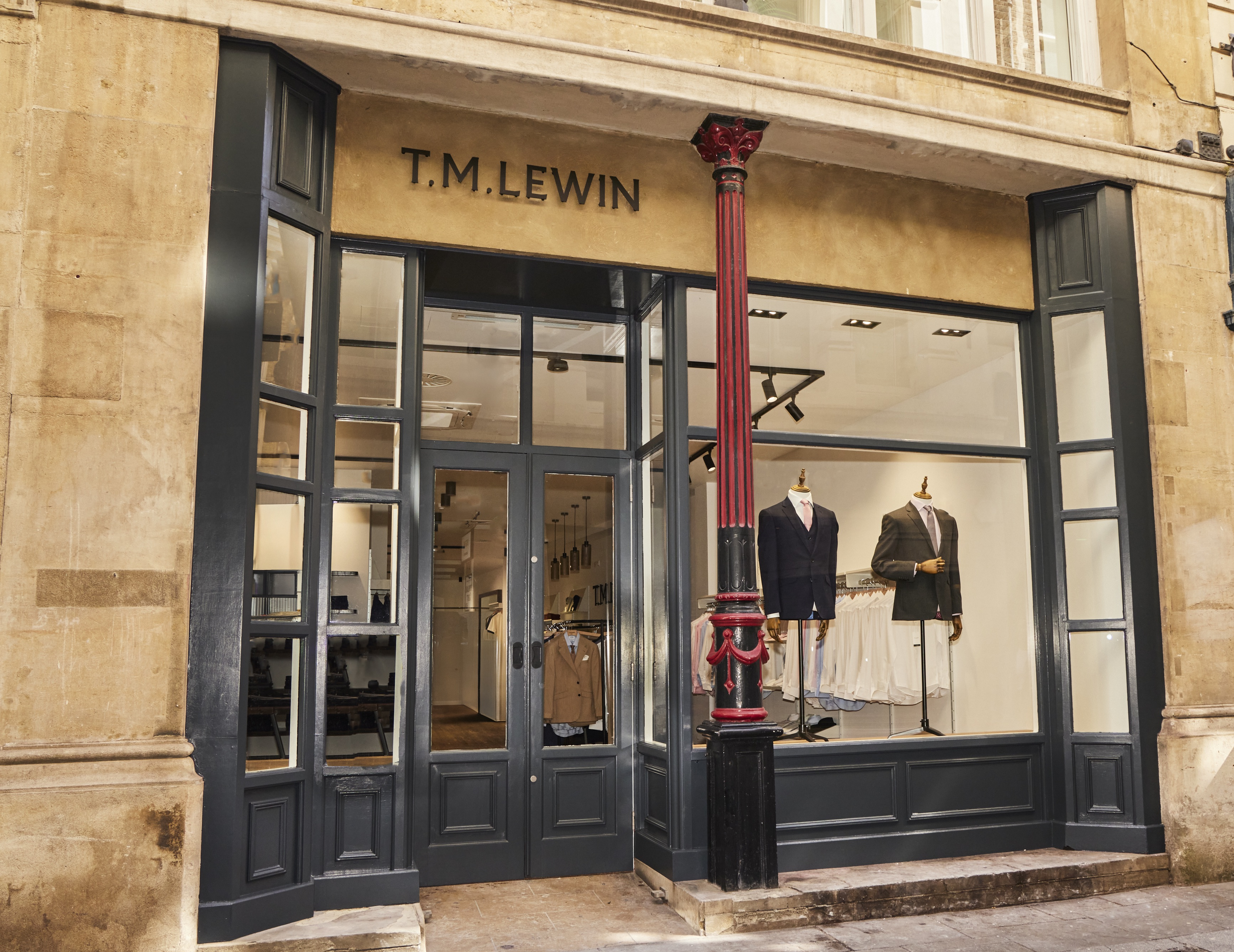
The T.M.Lewin Bow Lane shop in London

TM Lewin Shirtmaker Limited, commonly known as T.M.Lewin, is a British menswear retailer. It was started in 1898 by Thomas Mayes Lewin who opened his first shop on London's Panton Street and later moved to Jermyn Street, renowned as a base for formal shirts. TM Lewin started out making shirts but later started to sell suits, outerwear, knitwear, jackets, chinos, ties and accessories for men.

== History ==
=== 19th century ===
The business was founded by Thomas Mayes Lewin on London's Panton Street in 1898, before moving to Jermyn Street in 1903. Lewin has been credited with helping to popularise the modern, button-front shirt. In the past, men had pulled shirts on over their heads.

=== 20th century ===
During the 1900s, Thomas Mayes developed a reputation for design and quality among London's gentlemen. In 1903, Mr Lewin's “coat shirt” was described as a “novel idea” in London Opinion and Today.

During World War I, TM Lewin supplied the RAF and British Army with uniform.

T.M.Lewin was for a time a partnership between Thomas Mayes Lewin and Geoffrey James Lewin, operating from 39 Panton Street in London. Following retirement, the partnership was dissolved from 1 January 1938, the business continuing as T.M.Lewin and Sons Ltd.

In 1978, the McKenna family bought T.M.Lewin. In 1980, future MD Geoff Quinn joined, and helped grow the company so that it had its first £1m year in 1982.

In 1993, the company started an early mail order facility and began moving production from its factory in Southend-on-Sea overseas into Europe.

=== 21st century ===
2000 saw T.M.Lewin open its fifth store (at Ludgate Circus in London) and start testing its promotional offers, something that would become a defining characteristic of the brand. It was also awarded the GQ magazine award for 5* shirt.

In 2005, T.M.Lewin branched out from shirts and started making suits. In the same year, it supplied the ties for the London 2012 Olympic Bid and introduced the 4 for £100 deal.

By 2011, T.M.Lewin had 99 stores and outlets in Great Britain, one in Northern Ireland and one in the Republic of Ireland. A year later, it launched its first store outside Europe in Sydney, Australia. Following a 2015 deal with Bain Capital, Sven Gaede took over as CEO in 2018.

As of 2019, the company owned 68 stores in the United Kingdom, and 89 based internationally, including in Ireland, Australia, the United States and across Europe.

In April 2020, the company began talks with potential buyers, as the COVID-19 pandemic jeopardised the retailer's operations. It was reported that rival menswear retailer Charles Tyrwhitt was among a number of parties which submitted offers for T.M.Lewin. Bain Capital – the private equity group that has been supporting T.M.Lewin since 2015 through its debt investment arm – was keen to sell the heritage menswear retailer and enlisted corporate finance firm Alantra to conduct an auction. On 13 May 2020, T.M.Lewin was acquired by Torque Brands, a vehicle of private equity firm Stonebridge Capital.

Around 650 of T.M.Lewin's 700-strong employees were furloughed under the Coronavirus Job Retention Scheme of the UK government, while the stores remain temporarily closed throughout the pandemic. The 50 unfurloughed employees were active in digital operations and supply chain for T.M.Lewin. On 30 June 2020, T.M.Lewin announced the closure of all of its 66 UK shops and the redundancy of 600 workers. Stonebridge bought back the brand's remaining assets, including its online business, in a pre-pack deal after concluding T.M.Lewin was no longer viable in its current format.

== Campaigns ==
In 2017, Gary Lineker signed up to be the face of T.M.Lewin. This partnership continued in 2018 and 2019.

T.M.Lewin has collaborated with several sporting events and teams including Royal Ascot, Harlequins (rugby), and the England and Wales Cricket Board. In May 2021, TM Lewin announced that they had partnered with the British & Irish Lions for the 2021 British & Irish Lions tour to South Africa.

== Stores ==
After 5 years selling online, T.M.Lewin returned to the high street on 2 April 2025 with the opening of its Bow Lane store in the heart of the City of London.

T.M.Lewin has collaborated with several brands and mills including Liberty, Loro Piana, Albini and Falke.
