= Liberty (department store) =

Department store in London, England

Coordinates: 51.5139°N 0.1402°W

Liberty Retail Limited

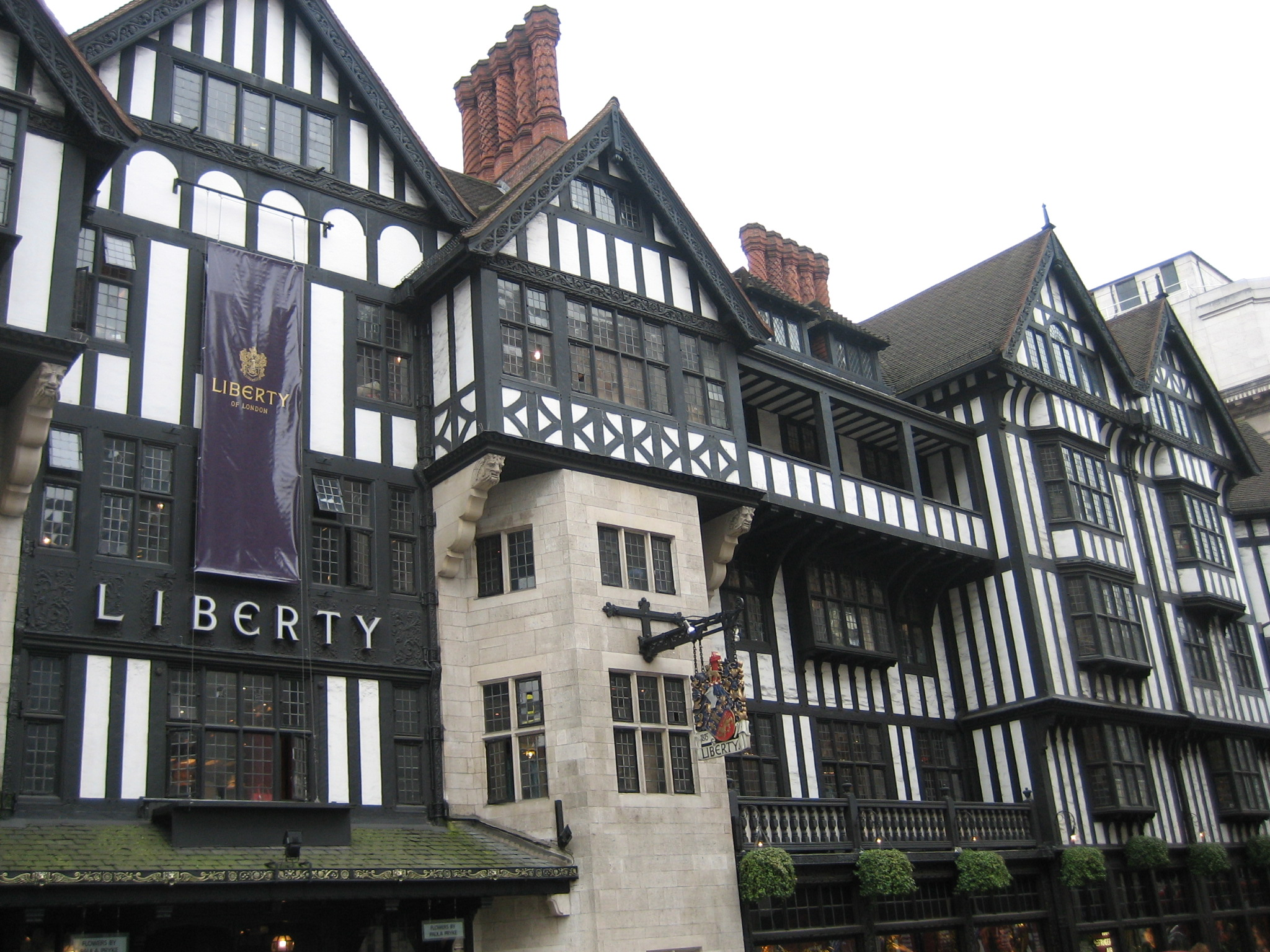
- Type: Private limited company
- Industry: Retail
- Founded: 1875; 151 years ago (incorporated in 1894)
- Founder: Arthur Lasenby Liberty
- Headquarters: London, W1; United Kingdom
- Products: Luxury goods
- Owner: Glendower Capital (c. 40%)
- Parent: Liberty Limited
- Website: www.libertylondon.com

Liberty, commonly known as Liberty's, is a luxury department store in London, England. It is located on Great Marlborough Street in the West End of London. The building spans from Carnaby Street in the East to Kingly Street in the West, where it forms a three storey archway over the Northern entrance to the Kingly Street mall that houses the Liberty Clock in its centre. Liberty is known around the world for its close connection to art and culture, but it is most famous for its bold and floral print fabrics. The vast mock-Tudor store also sells men's, women's and children's fashion, beauty and homewares from a mix of high-end and emerging brands and labels.

The store is known to spot and champion young designers at the start of their careers, and many now-prominent brands were first available at Liberty. The store played an essential role in spreading and popularizing the Modern Style. This continues Liberty's long reputation for working with British artists and designers.

== History ==
=== Early history ===
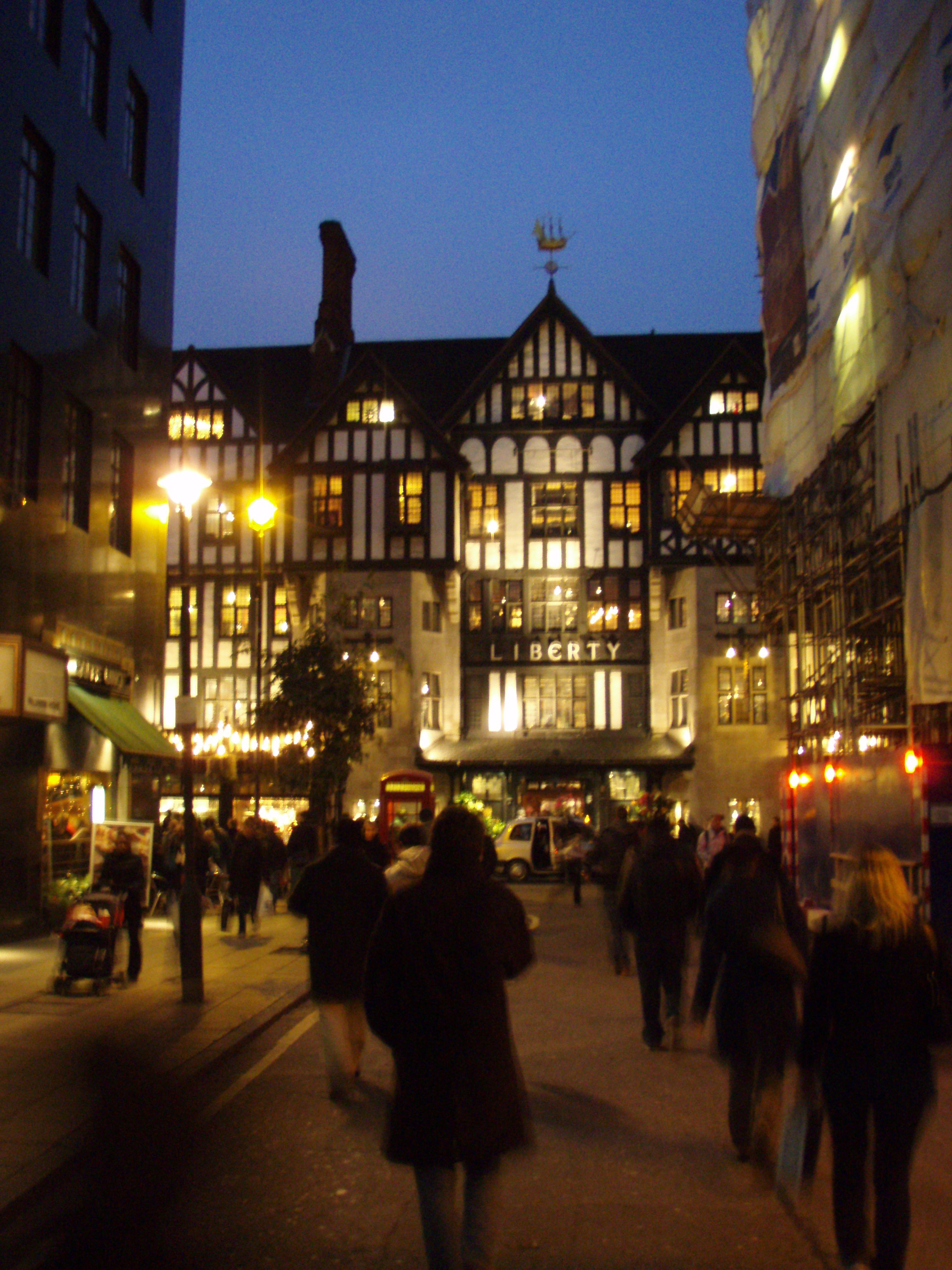
View from Argyll Street.

Arthur Lasenby Liberty was born in Chesham, Buckinghamshire, in 1843. He was employed by Messrs Farmer & Rogers in Regent Street in 1862, the year of the International Exhibition. By 1874, rejected for a partnership, and imbued by his 10 years experience, he decided to start a business of his own on the opposite side of Regent Street. With a £2,000 loan from his future father-in-law, in 1875, he accepted the lease of half a shop at 218a Regent Street with three staff members.

The shop sold ornaments, fabric and objets d'art, especially from Japan and the East. It was here that Dante Gabriel Rossetti purchased Blue and white chinese wares which he sold to the fellow painter James McNeill Whistler, who he introduced to Arthur Lasenby Liberty.

Within eighteen months, he had repaid the loan and acquired the second half of 218 Regent Street. As the business grew, neighbouring properties were bought and added. In 1884, he introduced the costume department, directed by Edward William Godwin (1833–1886), a distinguished architect and a founding member of The Costume Society. He and Arthur Liberty created in-house apparel to challenge the fashions of Paris.

In 1885, 142–144 Regent Street was acquired and housed the ever-increasing demand for carpets and furniture. The basement was named the Eastern Bazaar, and it was the vending place for what was described as "decorative furnishing objects". He named the property Chesham House, after the place in which he grew up. The store became the most fashionable place to shop in London, and Liberty fabrics were used for both clothing and furnishings.

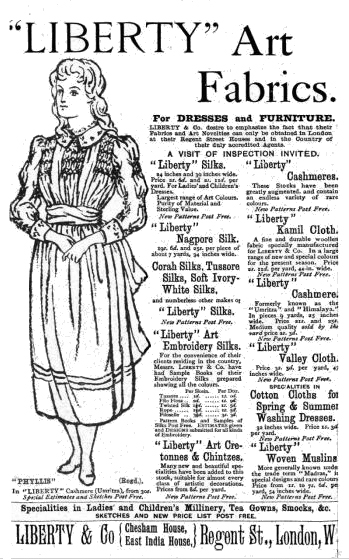
Liberty art fabrics advertisement, May 1888

In November 1885, Liberty brought forty-two villagers from India to stage a living village of Indian artisans. Liberty's specialised in Oriental goods, in particular imported Indian silks, and the aim of the display was to generate both publicity and sales for the store. In 1889, Oscar Wilde, a regular client of the store, wrote "Liberty's is the chosen resort of the artistic shopper".

During the 1890s, Liberty built strong relationships with many English designers. Many of these designers, including Archibald Knox, practised the artistic styles known as Arts and Crafts and Art Nouveau, and Liberty helped develop Art Nouveau through his encouragement of such designers. The company became associated with this new style, to the extent that in Italy, Art Nouveau became known as the Stile Liberty, after the London shop. The Cymric silverware and Tudric pewterware ranges were designed and manufactured for Liberty's from 1899 until the 1930s.

=== 1920s ===
The Tudor revival building was built so that trading could continue while renovations were being completed on the other premises, and in 1924, this store was constructed from the timbers of two ships: HMS Impregnable (formerly HMS Howe) and HMS Hindustan. The frontage on Great Marlborough Street is the same length as the Hindustan. It became a Grade II* listed building in 1972.

The emporium was designed by Edwin Thomas Hall and his son, Edwin Stanley Hall. They designed the building at the height of the 1920s fashion for Tudor revival. The shop was engineered around three light wells that formed the main focus of the building. Each of these wells was surrounded by smaller rooms to create a homey feel. Many of the rooms had fireplaces and some still exist.

The architectural historian Nikolaus Pevsner was very critical of the building's architecture, saying: "The scale is wrong, the symmetry is wrong. The proximity to a classical façade put up by the same firm at the same time is wrong, and the goings-on of a store behind such a façade (and below those twisted Tudor chimneys) are wrongest of all".

Arthur Liberty died in 1917, seven years before the completion of his shops.

=== Post-war ===
Liberty, during the 1950s, continued its tradition for fashionable and eclectic design. All departments in the shop had a collection of both contemporary and traditional designs. New designers were promoted and often included those still representing the Liberty tradition for handcrafted work.

In 1955, Liberty began opening several regional stores in other UK cities; The first of these was in Manchester. Subsequent shops opened in Bath, Brighton, Chester, York, Kingston upon Thames, Exeter and Norwich.

During the 1960s, extravagant and Eastern influences once again became fashionable, as well as the Art Deco style, and Liberty adapted its furnishing designs from its archive. The influential designer Bernard Nevill was hired by Liberty's initially as a design consultant before becoming design director. He reinvigorated Liberty's textile collections and attracted clients including Yves Saint Laurent, who bought thirteen different designs from the winter 1970 collection in thirty-four different colourways and the entire 'Chameleon' collection. One of Nevill's designs, called 'Corbusier' in honour of the architect Le Corbusier, was made into a jumpsuit for David Bowie and was featured on the album cover of The Rise and Fall of Ziggy Stardust.

In 1996, Liberty announced the closure of its twenty shops outside London, and instead focused on smaller outlets at airports.

Since 1988, Liberty has had a subsidiary in Japan which sells Liberty-branded products in major Japanese shops. It also sells Liberty fabrics to international and local fashion stores with bases in Japan.

=== 2000s ===
In 2006, Liberty closed the 15,000-square-foot (1,400 m^{2}) Regent Street section of the store, moving all operations into the Tudor Building.

Liberty's London store was sold for £41.5 million (equivalent to £66.2 million in 2025) and then leased back by the firm in 2009, to pay off debts ahead of a potential sale of the company. Subsequently, in 2010, Liberty was taken over by private equity firm BlueGem Capital, in a deal worth £32 million (equivalent to £49.4 million in 2025). In 2019 BlueGem sold their controlling (40%) stake to a consortium of private equity groups led by Glendower Capital.

== TV documentary ==
From 2 December 2013, Liberty was the focus of a three-part hour-long episode TV documentary series titled Liberty of London, airing on Channel 4. The documentary follows Ed Burstell (Managing Director) and the department's retail team in the busy lead up to Christmas 2013.

Channel 4 further commissioned a second series of the documentary on 28 October 2014. This series featured four, one hour-long episodes based on six months worth of unprecedented footage. Series two commenced on 12 November 2014.

== Collaborations ==
Liberty has a history of collaborative projects – from William Morris and Dante Gabriel Rossetti in the nineteenth century to Yves Saint Laurent and Dame Vivienne Westwood in the twentieth century. Recent collaborations include brands such as Scott Henshall, Nike, Dr. Martens, Hello Kitty, Barbour, House of Hackney, Vans, Onia, Manolo Blahnik, Uniqlo, J.Crew, Superga, Target, Adidas, T. M. Lewin and Casio.

== In popular culture ==
The store was used as a filming location and was included within the plot-line of the 2021 Disney film Cruella.

Liberty makes a cameo appearance in the 2020 film Enola Holmes.

== See also ==
- Althea McNish – a textile designer commissioned by Liberty's to design fashion and furnishing textiles and scarves from 1957
- Bernard Nevill – a designer hired by Liberty during the 1960s
- List of department stores by country
- List of department stores of the United Kingdom
- Merton Abbey Mills – a textile factory in Merton, London, which was used extensively for printing Liberty fabrics.

== References and sources ==
Alison Adburgham, Liberty's: A Biography of a Shop, George Allen and Unwin (1975)
