= Archibald Knox (designer) =

Manx designer, 1864–1933

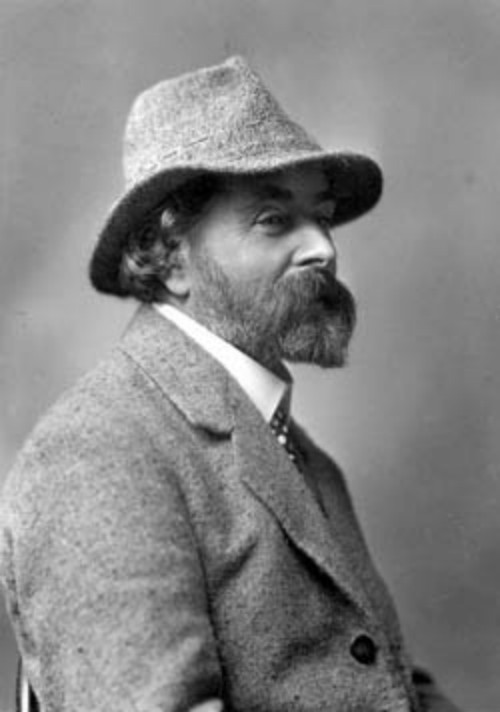
- Photo of Archibald Knox, c. 1900, at age 36
- Born: 9 April 1864; Cronkbourne, near Tromode, Isle of Man
- Died: 22 February 1933 (aged 68); Douglas, Isle of Man,
- Known for: Design
- Movement: Arts and Crafts Movement, Celtic Revival
- Patrons: Arthur Lasenby Liberty

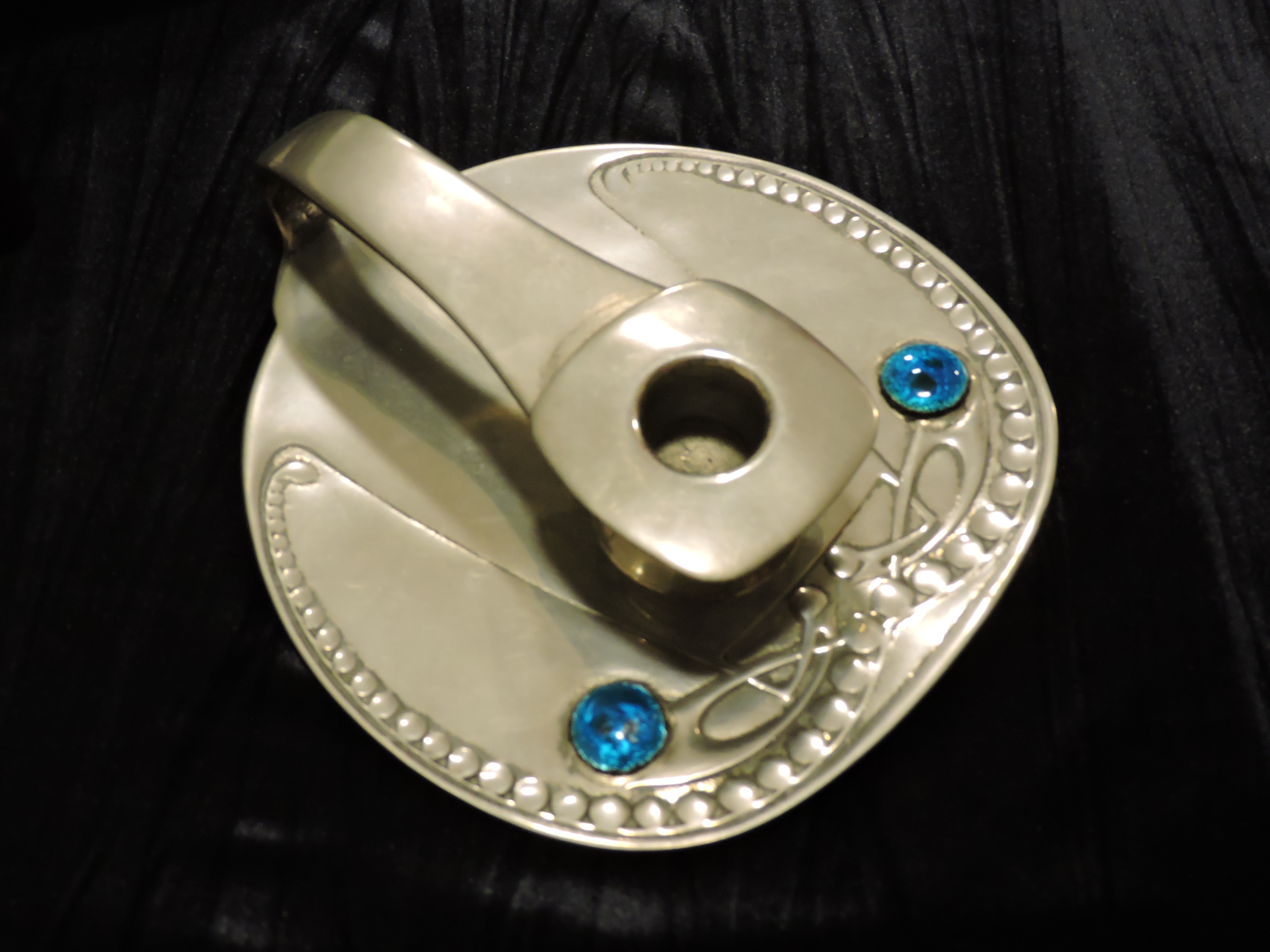
A candle holder designed by Archibald Knox

Archibald Knox (9 April 1864 – 22 February 1933) was a Manx designer of Scottish descent. He is best known as being Liberty's primary designer at the height of their success and influence upon British and International design. Knox's work bridged the Arts and Crafts Movement, Celtic Revival, Art Nouveau, and Modernism. He is seen as a leading figure of the Modern Style movement.

Knox's hundreds of designs for Liberty made his style widely known, though not his name, as Liberty kept their designers anonymous. Most of his work for Liberty was for the Tudric (pewter) and Cymric (precious metals) ranges. The gravestone of Liberty founder, Arthur Lasenby Liberty, was designed by Knox.

His design talent covered a wide range of objects, ornamental and utilitarian, and included silverware and pewterware, jewellery, inkwells, boxes, gravestones, watercolours, graphic designs, calligraphy, a house design, fonts and even bank cheques.

Some sources estimate that he produced around 5,000 designs.

== Early life and family background ==
Knox was born in Cronkbourne village, Tromode, Braddan, Isle of Man.

He was the 5th child (and 5th son) of William Knox, a cabinet maker and Ann Carmichael in Cronkbourne village, Braddan. His father was living in Kilbirnie in 1853 when he married Ann, who was from the isle of Lismore in Scotland, which was a centre of the medieval Celtic Christian church in the Western Isles. In 1856, the Knoxes moved to the Isle Of Man for a better life, with their firstborn, Robert. William Knox, "an exceptionally ingenious cabinet and machine-maker, joined Moore’s Tromode Works, makers of high quality herring nets and sailcloth." In 1856, William's sister Margaret had been the first Knox to move to Man when she married a Manx fisherman, William Callister. William Knox later started his own firm "William Knox’s Engineering Works" and was joined in his enterprise by four of his sons – only Archibald pursued his own career in art. Besides running a successful steamboat and ferry business, the Knox family mechanised the local fishing fleet, were pioneers in industrial electric lighting on Man and introduced the first motor car to the island. Knox's engineering background may have influenced his design process in that his metalwork designs were produced in the style of ready-to-engineer blueprints.

== Education ==
Knox started his education at St Barnabas Elementary School, and then attended Douglas Grammar School. The Knox family lived and worked on Douglas, Isle of Man harbour and quayside and the teenage Knox started sketching around the area. In 1880, at the age of 16, Knox enrolled at the newly opened and innovative Douglas School of Art. The students there considered themselves 'venturesome modernists'. In 1889 Knox was awarded his Art Master's Certificate. During his youth Knox developed a lifelong interest in early Manx history and Celtic art, particularly the carved Celtic and Norse stone crosses in the Isle of Man which date from c.500AD to c.1200AD. As a young teacher at Douglas he befriended the headmaster and antiquarian, Canon John Quine, and they would go on regular expeditions to explore sites. Knox and Quine later restored the derelict church of Old Kirk Lonan where Quine was vicar. Knox campaigned in the 1870s for the derelict Manx Cathedral on St Patrick's Isle, Peel to be restored and reinstated, and set up the League of St German in 1896 to do so.

== Career ==
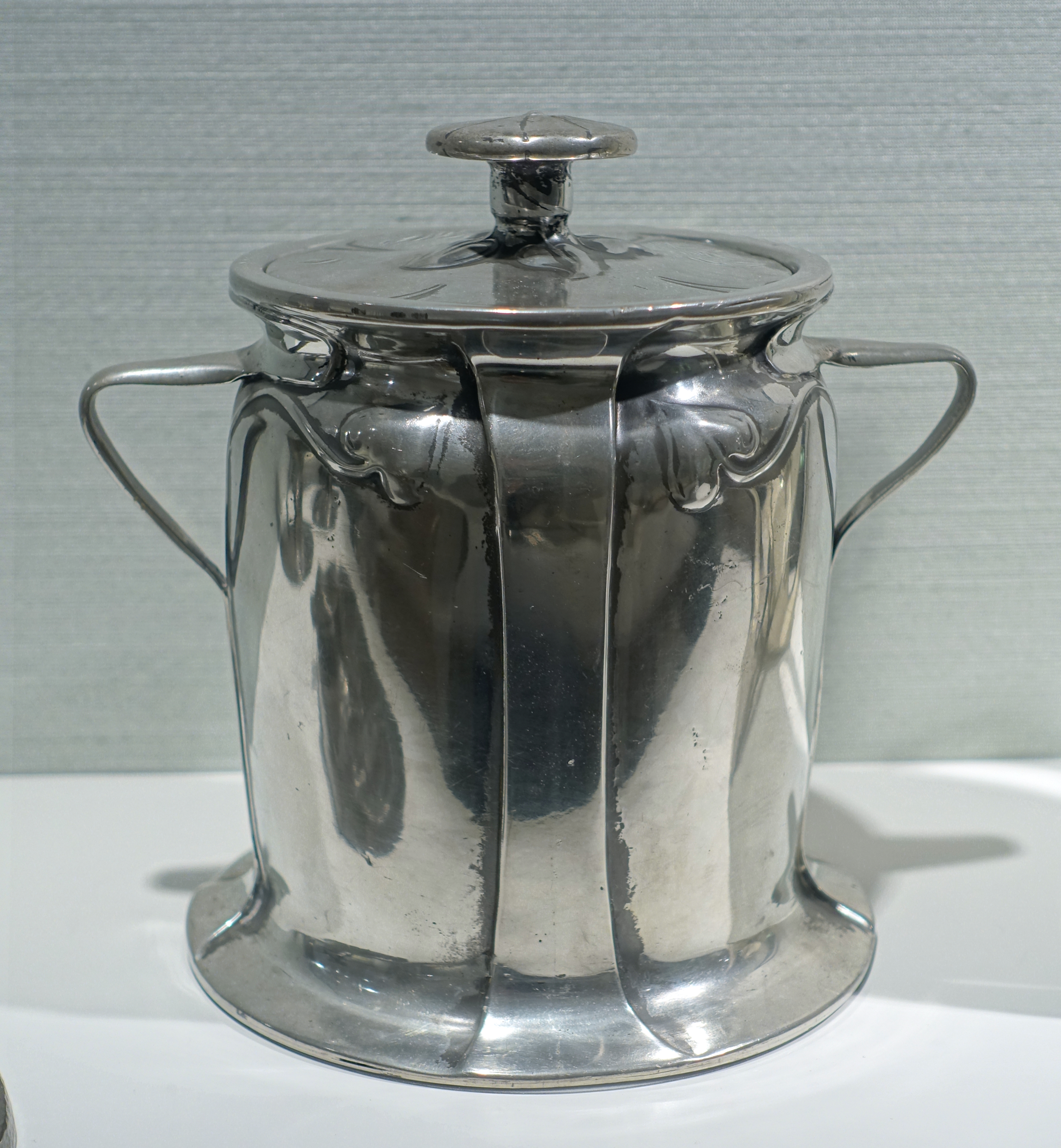
Tobacco canister from the Tudric series, by Archibald Knox, Liberty & Co., London, c. 1902, tin – Hessisches Landesmuseum Darmstadt, Darmstadt, Germany

Knox started teaching at Douglas School of Art in 1884, while still a student. The Arts and Crafts architect Baillie Scott started classes at the Art School while Knox was teaching there, and Knox worked with him on some interiors. In 1893, The Builder published Knox's article, "Ancient Crosses in the Isle of Man".

In 1896 or 1897 Knox was working for / studying with the pioneering designer Christopher Dresser in London. In 1897, Knox started teaching at Redhill School of Art where his friend from art school A. J. Collister was principal.

In 1897 Knox began working for the Silver Studio, who were designing for Liberty. In 1899 he left with Collister for the Kingston School of Art. From 1900 to 1904 Knox returned to the Isle of Man, and produced over 400 designs directly for Liberty of London, most notably for the Cymric and Tudric ranges. Their Cymric catalogue stated, “The feature of this development is, its complete breaking away from convention in the matter of design treatment”. "Knox and his colleagues whether they be his fellow designers at the Silver Studio or the Liberty management who gave their undoubted support, had moved the Arts and Crafts stylistic principles one stage further forward and in so doing, had created a distinctive British version of Art Nouveau" (V&A) This work contributed to Liberty's aim of "the production of useful and beautiful objects at prices within the reach of all classes." Knox then returned to teach at Kingston School of Art and Wimbledon Art School 1906/07, again following his friend A. J. Collister.

=== Teaching methods and design principles ===
Knox told his students a large number of maxims that give an insight into his design principles. Perhaps the primary one was “Aim at order, hope for beauty”. Knox wrote on the blackboard for new students, “Never be ordinary, better be nothing than that”. Another maxim was, “Art is in everything if we choose to put it there”. In 1912 Knox wrote to a student “Don’t slacken in your work: work and think – think and work: that is the royal road: there is no other through the forest of art”.

Knox had an innovative method of teaching art: he collected a set of three thousand glass slides, of examples of design work, to show his students. While showing these he encouraged the students to consider the design principles involved in each, and whether the design met the functional requirements.

As his student Winifred Tuckfield described in 1916, "Mr. Knox's system of teaching was essentially his own. Instead of insisting on the English method of art education by making laborious copies of scraps of museum specimens of 'styles' he made at his own expense three thousand lantern slides, illustrating works of art from prehistoric times down to the gipsy caravans of to-day, showing how Art was produced by the workman in the joy of using his chisel or hammer. To you of MANNIN it will be interesting to know that he gave lectures on your grey thatched homes, your churches, and your crosses, making us love them as if they were our own."

Tuckfield also said, "Many of the lectures were divided into groups, such as colour, windows, pot contours, etc. Comparing one example with another Mr. Knox would show which had the greatest thought in it, which was most suited to its purpose and the material used – teaching that there were two Natures, Outside Nature and Our Own, the last being Art, Art the outcome, or the reward of practice and study. Style or Art came to the artist as to the musician, only after long and continual application to the paintbox or the keyboard, application with resolution and thought. Not until this Self Nature was expressed was the work produced complete, distinctive by its individuality, glowing as a stone mined from the recesses of the unknown."

=== Manx renaissance interests ===
Knox had a profound and intertwining interest in the natural world and landscape, the spiritual life, and the history and art of the Isle of Man and particularly the early Celtic Christian Church. He described this connection in his illuminated 1913 poem "Renshent", written about an early Celtic Christian keeill (chapel) on the Isle of Man.

Knox was part of a 'Manx renaissance' of culture and history led by antiquarians. They rediscovered, reconstructed and reinterpreted history and traditions to bolster Manx cultural distinctiveness and devolved political status in the face of economic and social influences from the British Empire and the thousands of visitors to the Island's booming tourism industry. This was part of a wider Celtic Revival echoed in smaller nations across Europe asserting their identities.

On Sundays Knox would go to the countryside to paint. He would often wait for hours for the right effect of light and weather, and would then catch the effect rapidly in watercolour. He has been described as "The man who could paint the wind". While living in Sulby (1902–1905), Knox wrote of his watercolours that 'the places painted are within short walks from my home, passed often; one day something never seen before; some new appearance of colour and the bends of the sky. It may not be seen again; shortly it will fade and disappear, and in an hour forgotten. Such sights as they, as men over unimaginable centuries have looked at and learned to know their land is beautiful.’

Several of his watercolours of Manx scenes were given as new to the Manx Museum to be sold in order to fund its expansion. A collection of them sold originally for £5 each were auctioned in Exeter for several thousand pounds, early in the 21st century, some of them returning to the island.

=== Late years 1912–1933 ===
In 1912, Knox resigned from his post as Head of Design at Kingston School of Art following criticism of his teaching. About twenty of his students also quit and set up the Knox Guild of Design and Crafts. Knox was the Master of the Guild and would return to Kingston to exhibit with them. In 1913, he spent a year in the United States, and on his return to Man acted as a censor of internees' letters during World War I. In 1919, after the War, he again took up teaching art at some of the Isle of Man's schools until his death. Knox produced a variety of design work on the island for publications, illuminations, and gravestones.

Knox's great late work was an illuminated manuscript titled 'The Deer's Cry'. This was a personal project for over 20 years and an intricate visual meditation on the Irish prayer of St Patrick known as 'The Deer's Cry' or 'Saint Patrick's Breastplate'. Each page is a complex interlaced illumination of a line of the prayer. The style, imagery, and colouring of each page reflects the content of each line of the prayer.

== Personal life and death ==
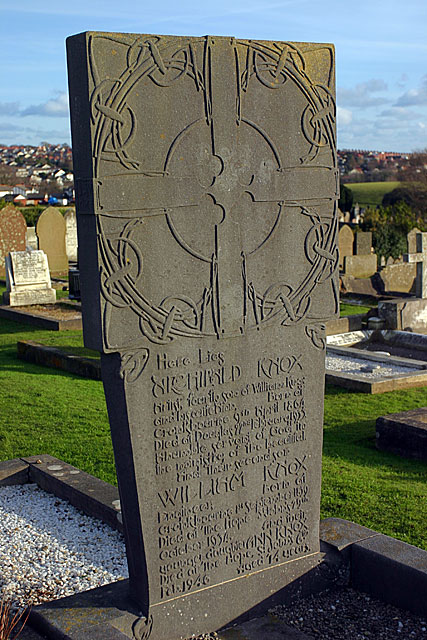
Knox's grave in New Kirk Braddan cemetery

Knox has been described as modest and monk-like: "almost Cistercian in his silence". He has also been described as gruff and stubborn. However, he did have close friendships, such as with Canon Quine and A. J. Collister. He was an active member of various societies such as the Isle of Man Antiquarian Society and the Freemasons. He was a sidesman at his local high Anglican Church, St Matthew's. He also wrote a number of articles in journals to communicate his ideas.

Knox died of heart failure in 1933 in Douglas, Isle of Man and was buried in Braddan Cemetery. His epitaph reads "Archibald Knox. Artist. A humble servant of God in the ministry of the beautiful".

== Legacy ==
In 1975 the V&A Museum staged an exhibition of Liberty's designs. This started a slow increase in awareness of Knox and his work.

Cadran Cottage, Ballanard Road in Douglas, remodelled c.1910 with design by Knox, was listed as a Registered Building of the Isle of Man in 1996. 'Cadran' means quadrant.

The first international touring exhibition of Knox's work was in 1996–1998.

The Archibald Knox Society was founded in 2006. The aim of the Society is the education of the public worldwide in relation to all matters concerning the legacy of Knox. To this end the Society has given lectures, (including an international tour), published journals and helped to organise exhibitions.

To celebrate the 150th Anniversary of Knox's birth, the Isle of Man Post Office issued a set of 10 stamps featuring his designs, released in April 2014. Also in 2014, an exhibition exploring the work of Knox and his Celtic contemporaries ("Celtic Style") was held at the House of Manannan, Peel, Isle of Man. A commemorative concert was held at Peel Cathedral featuring newly composed harp music and also including Manx Gaelic choir music. An exhibition of Knox's work was held at the 42nd Olympia International Art & Antiques Fair in London in 2014.

In 2019 Knox was added to the Manx Patriot's Roll of Honour for his role in reviving the island's culture. A spokesperson for the awarding committee said, "He took the Isle of Man's Celtic and Norse art history and brought it back to life, revamping and reinvigorating it almost a millennium after the original artists had passed."

== Gallery ==
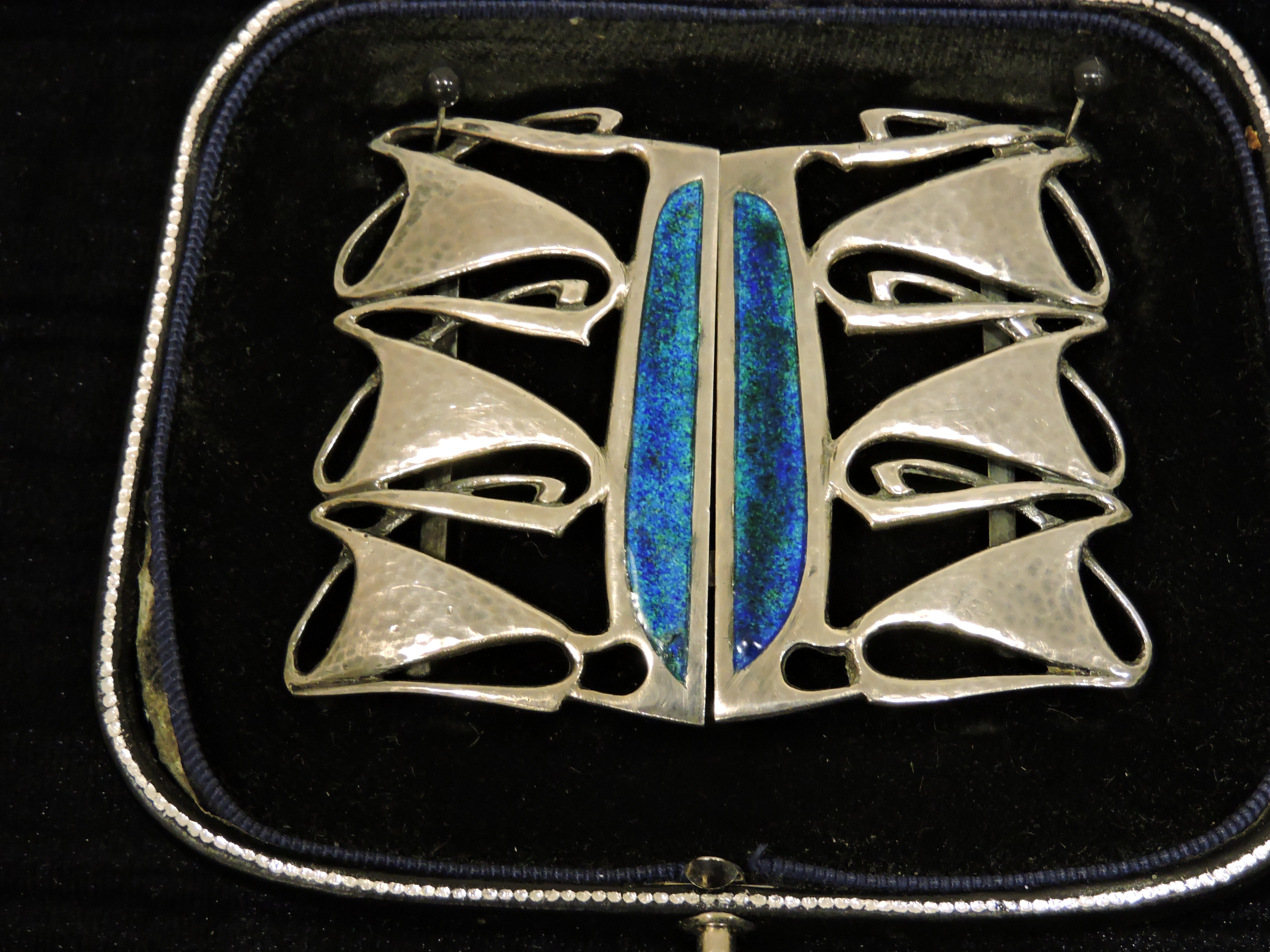
Belt buckle designed by Archibald Knox

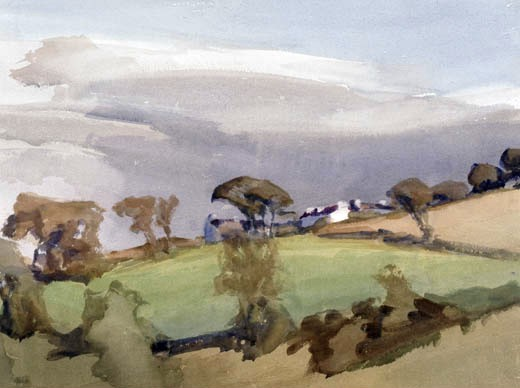
Lhergy, watercolour on paper (1900–20)

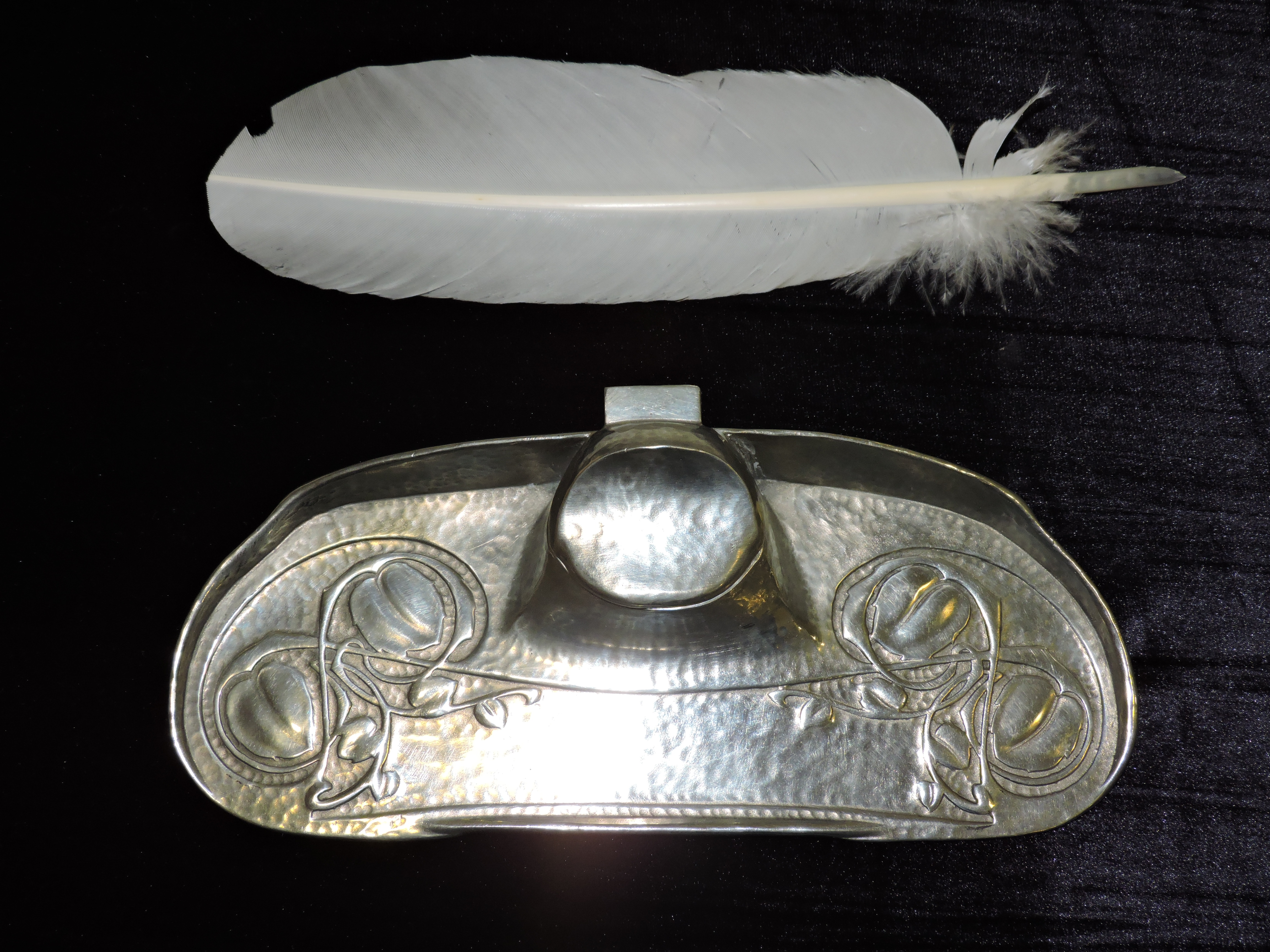
Inkwell designed by Knox

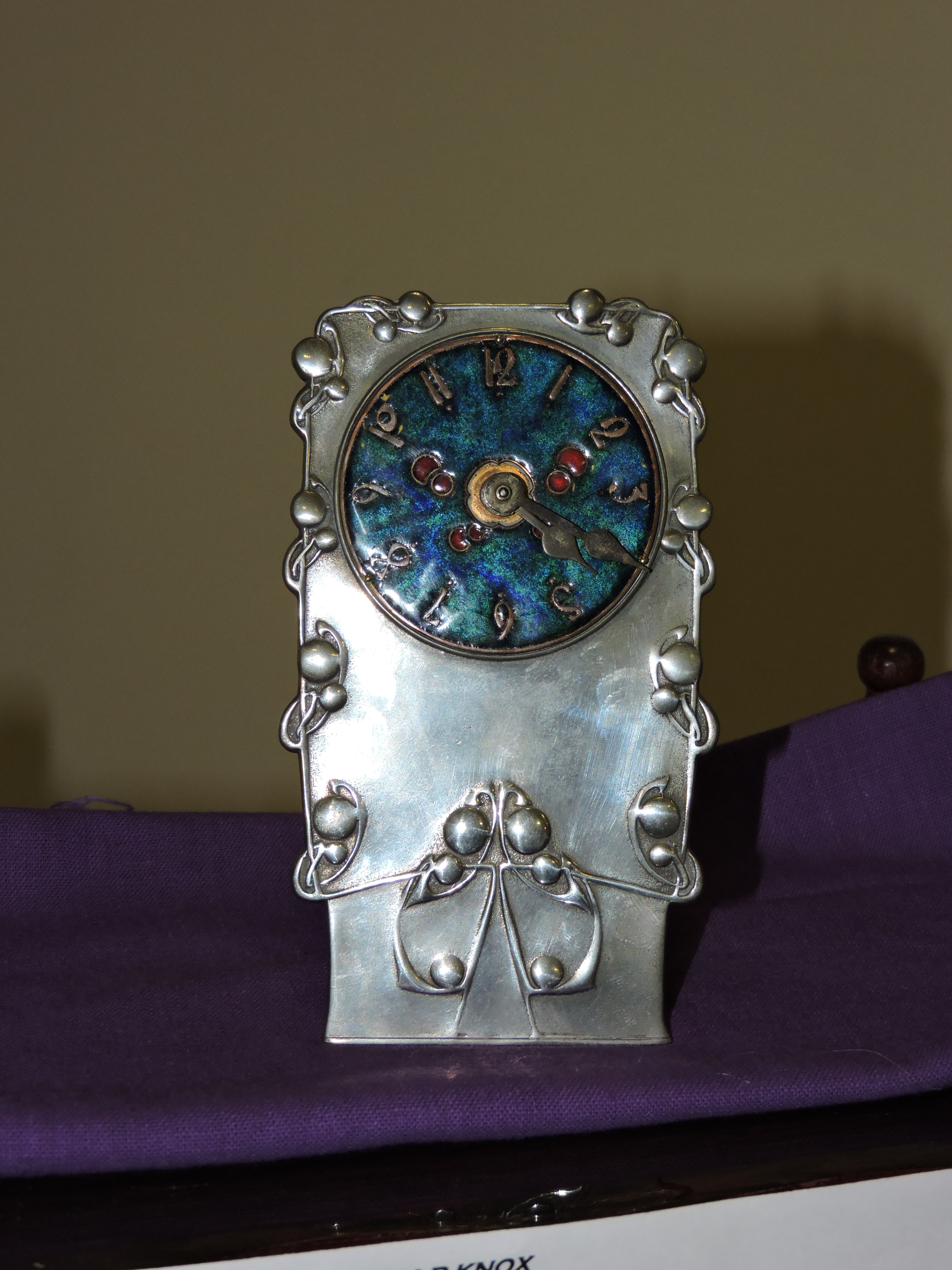
An 'easel' clock style 0608 designed by Knox

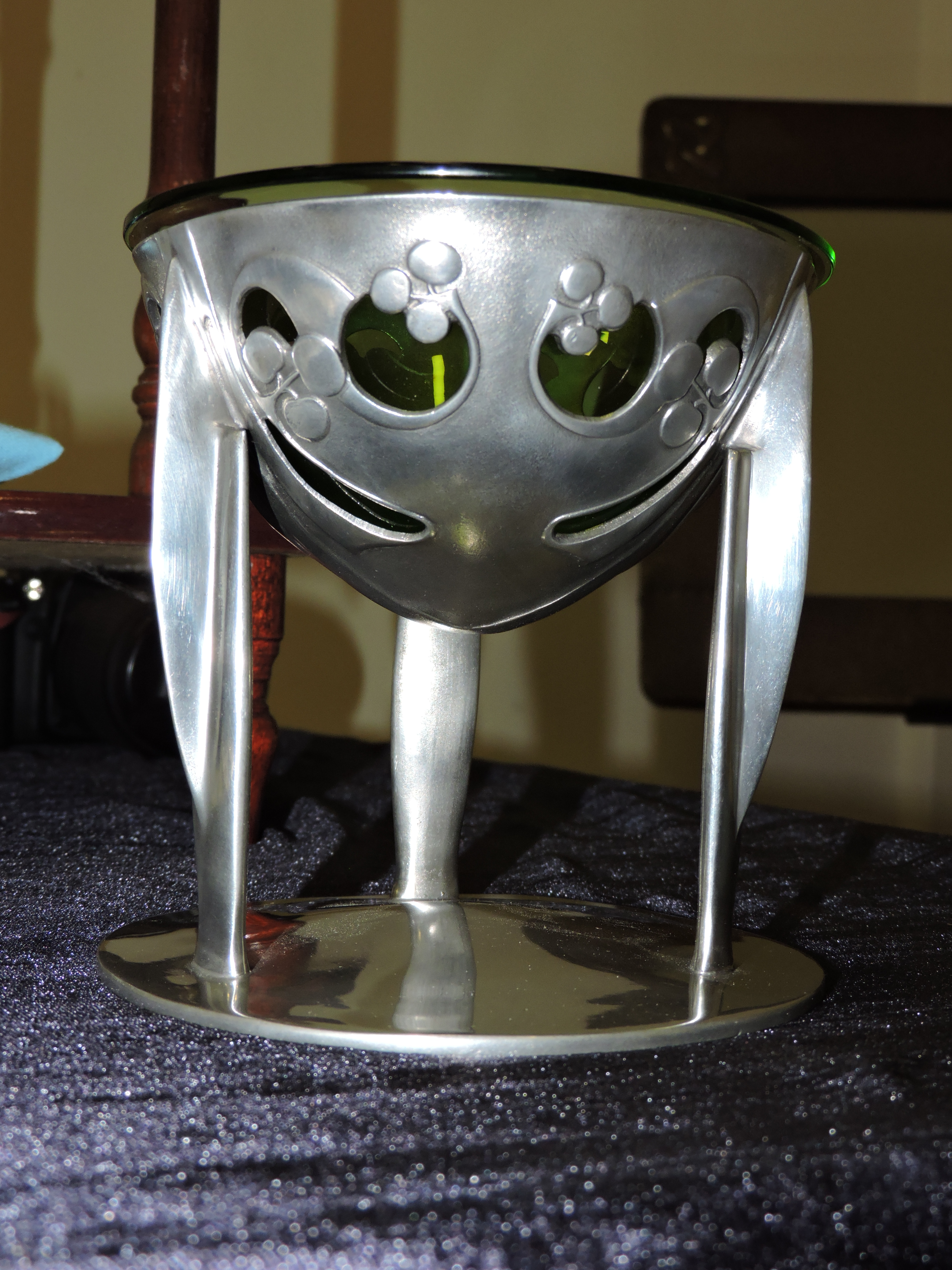
Sweet dish designed by Knox

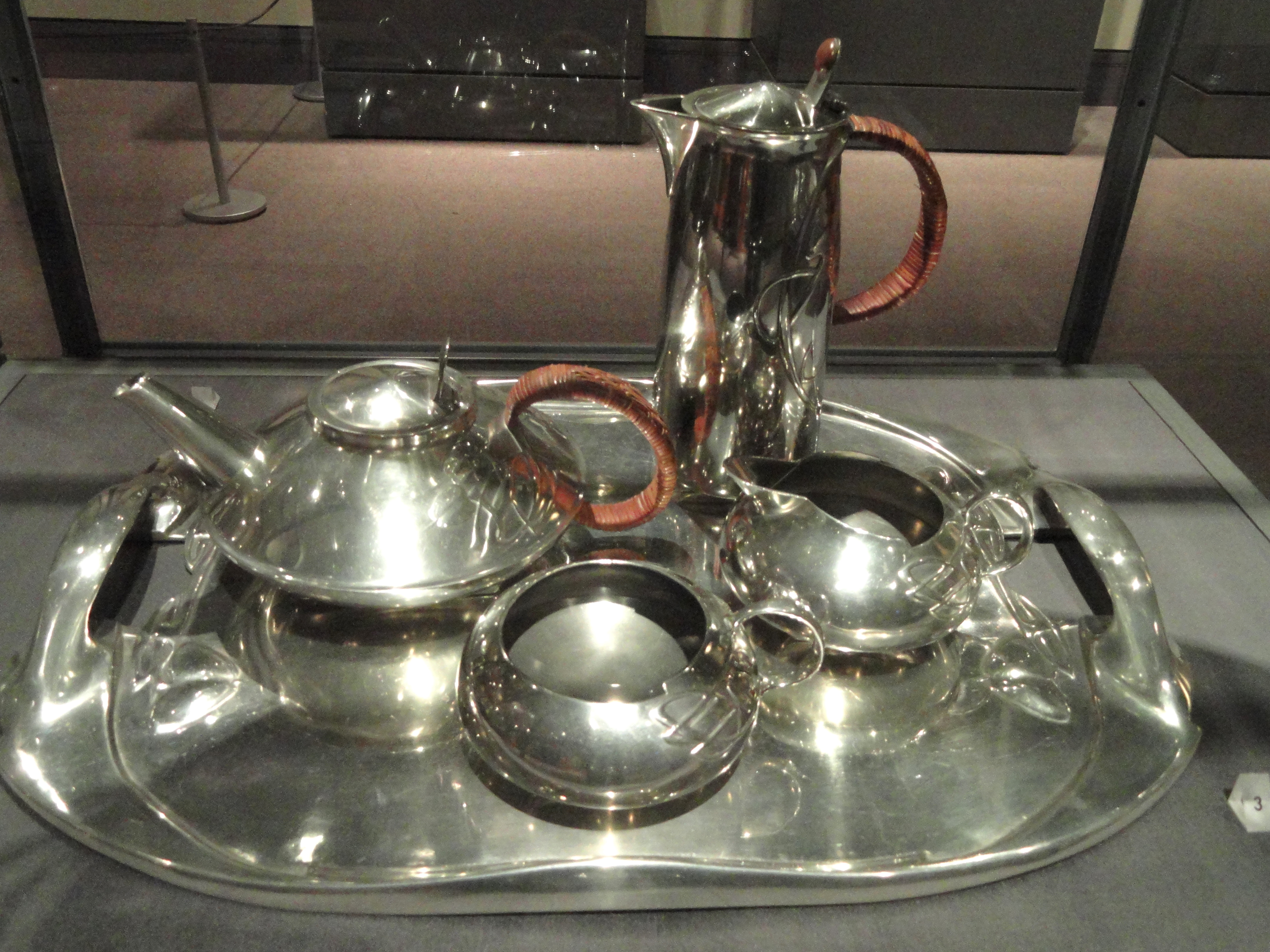
Tea service, 1903

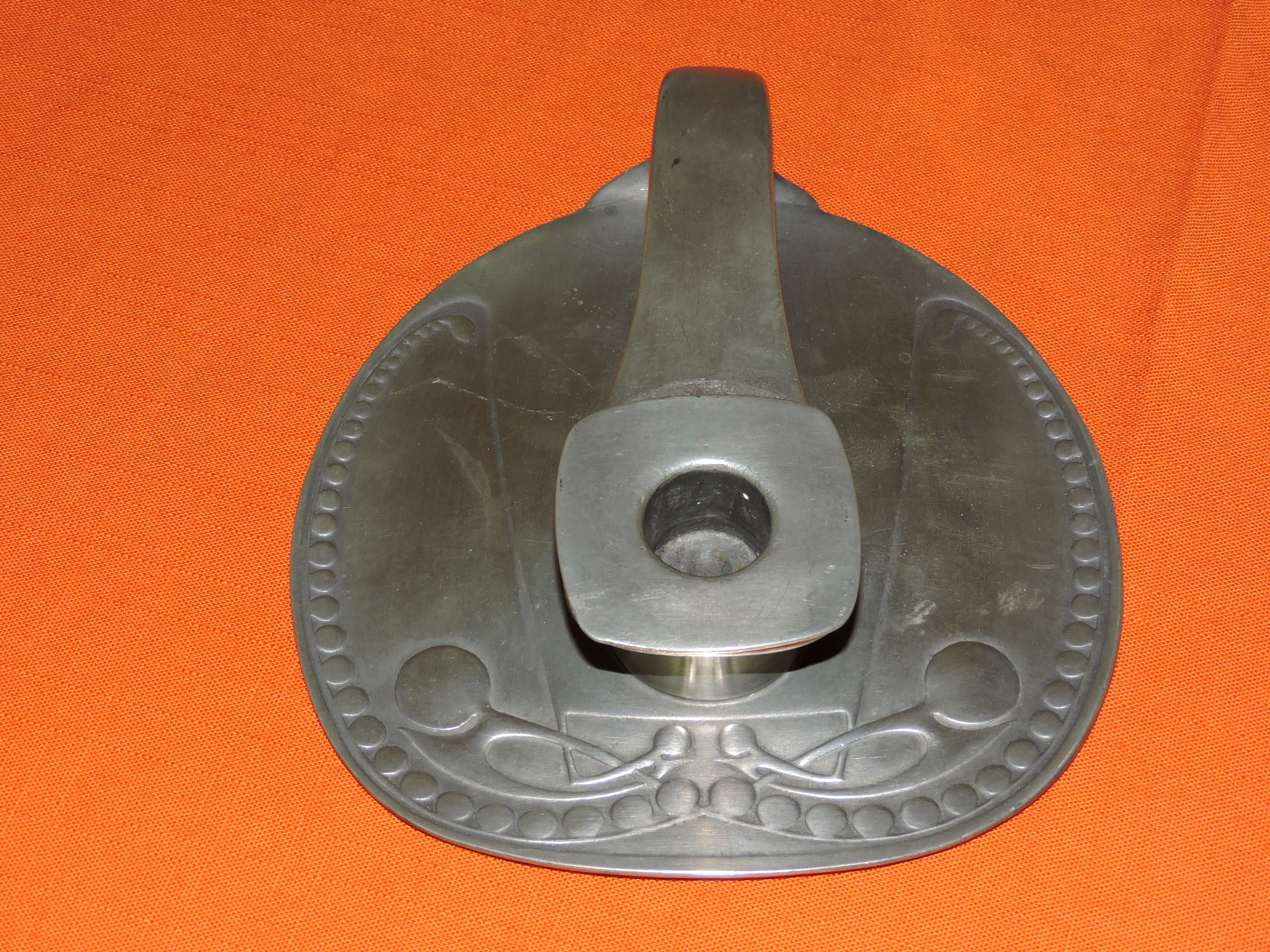
Pewter candlestick designed by Knox

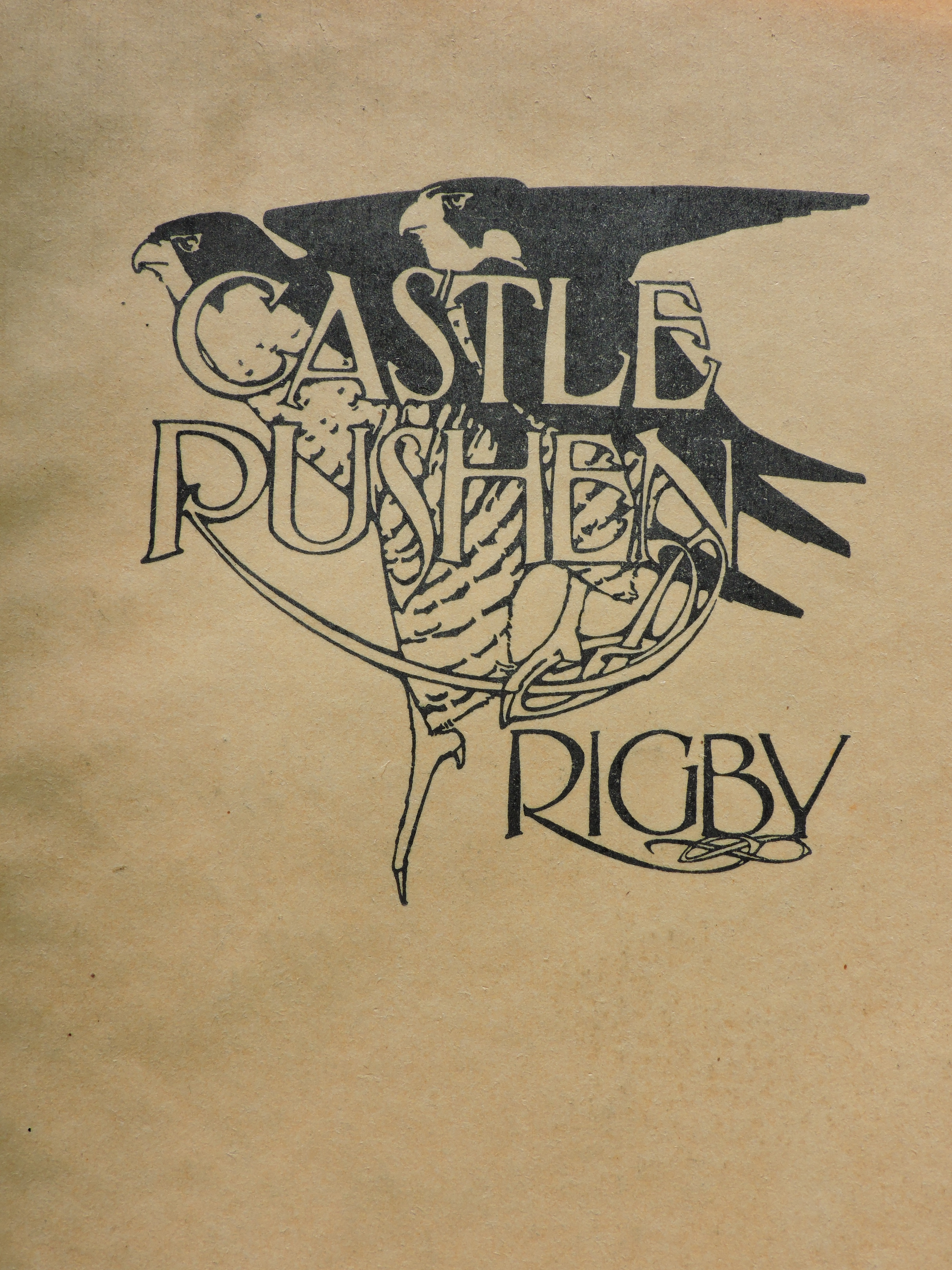
Knox illustration of 'Castle Rushen' by Armitage Rigby.

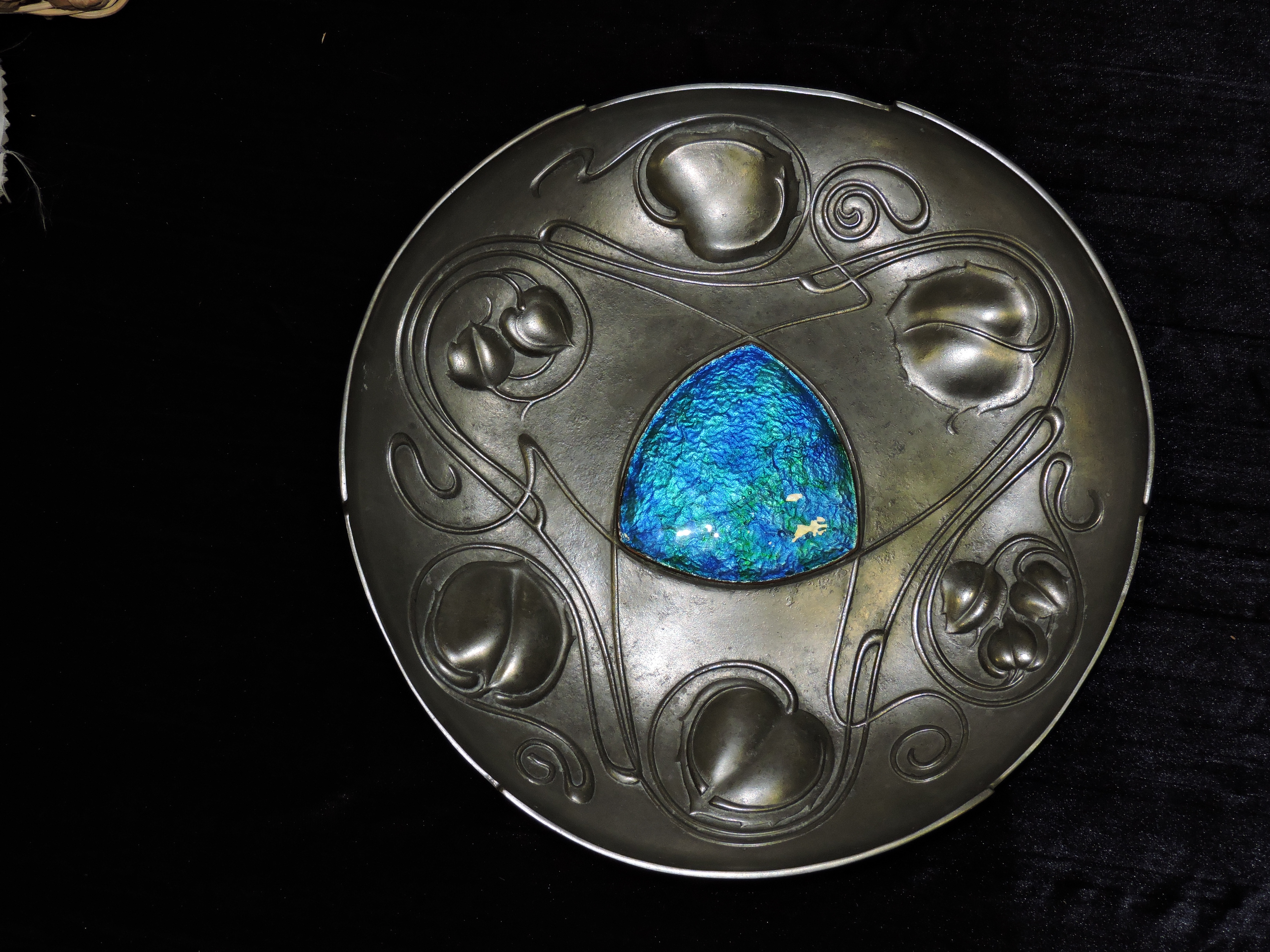
'Bollelin' Pewter and enamel plate designed by Knox

== See also ==
- Mannin (journal)
