= Inkwell =

Container used for holding ink

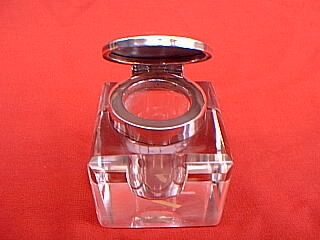
An English silver and glass inkwell, hallmark date 1910

An inkwell is a small jar or container, often made of glass, ceramic, or metal used for holding ink in a place convenient for the person who is writing. The artist or writer dips the brush, quill, or dip pen into the inkwell as needed or uses the inkwell as the source for filling the reservoir of a fountain pen. An inkwell may have a lid to prevent drying or spilling. A type known as the travelling inkwell was fitted with a secure screw lid so a traveller could carry a supply of ink in their luggage without the risk of leakage.

== History ==
The inkwell's origins trace back to Ancient Egypt where scribes wrote on papyrus. After Rome invaded Egypt, inkwells became more popular in Italy as a larger percentage of the population were capable of writing.

Inkwells gradually fell out of use in the middle part of 20th century.

== Gallery ==
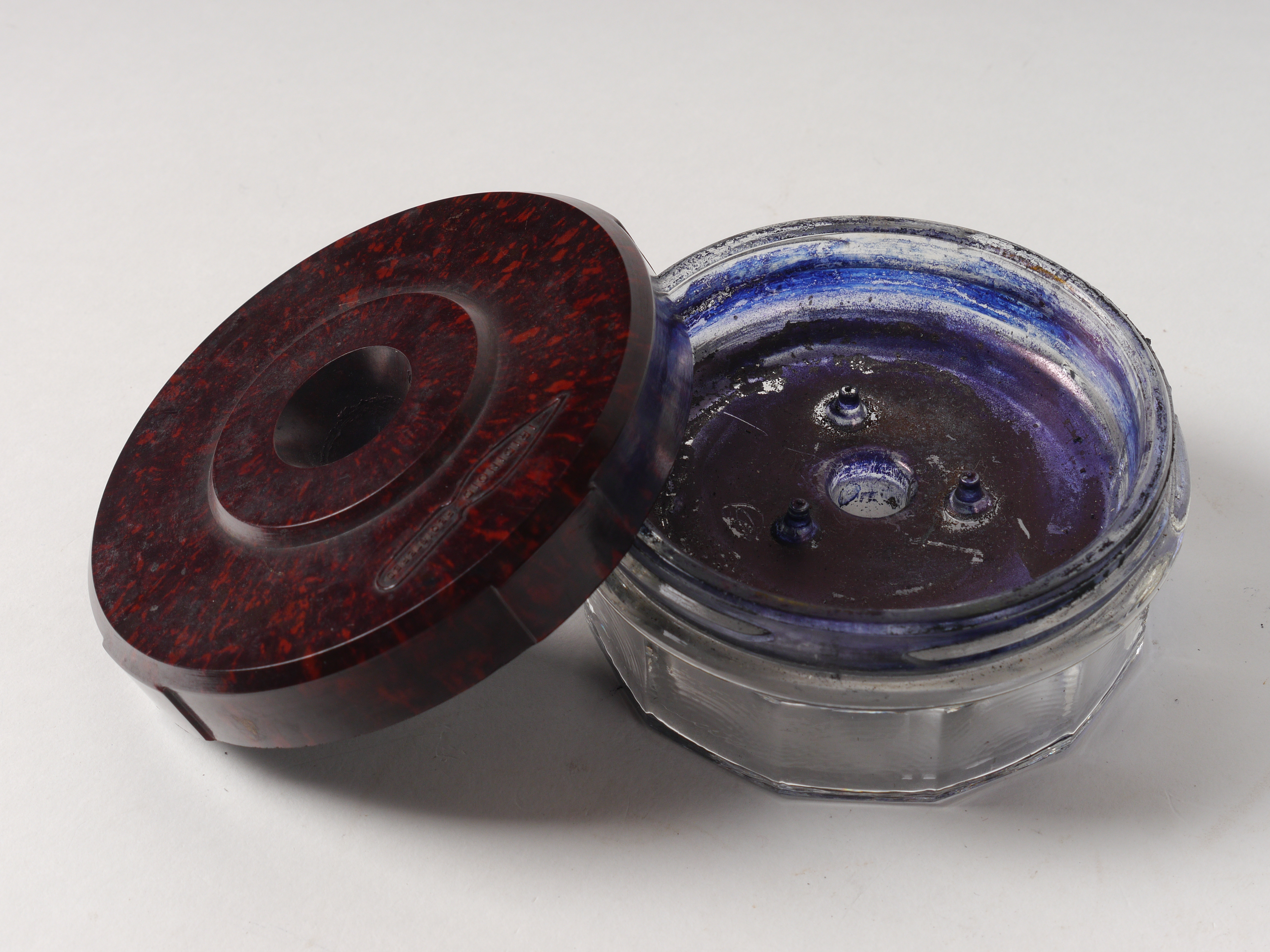
Round glass inkwell with bakelite lid and hole for capping the pen

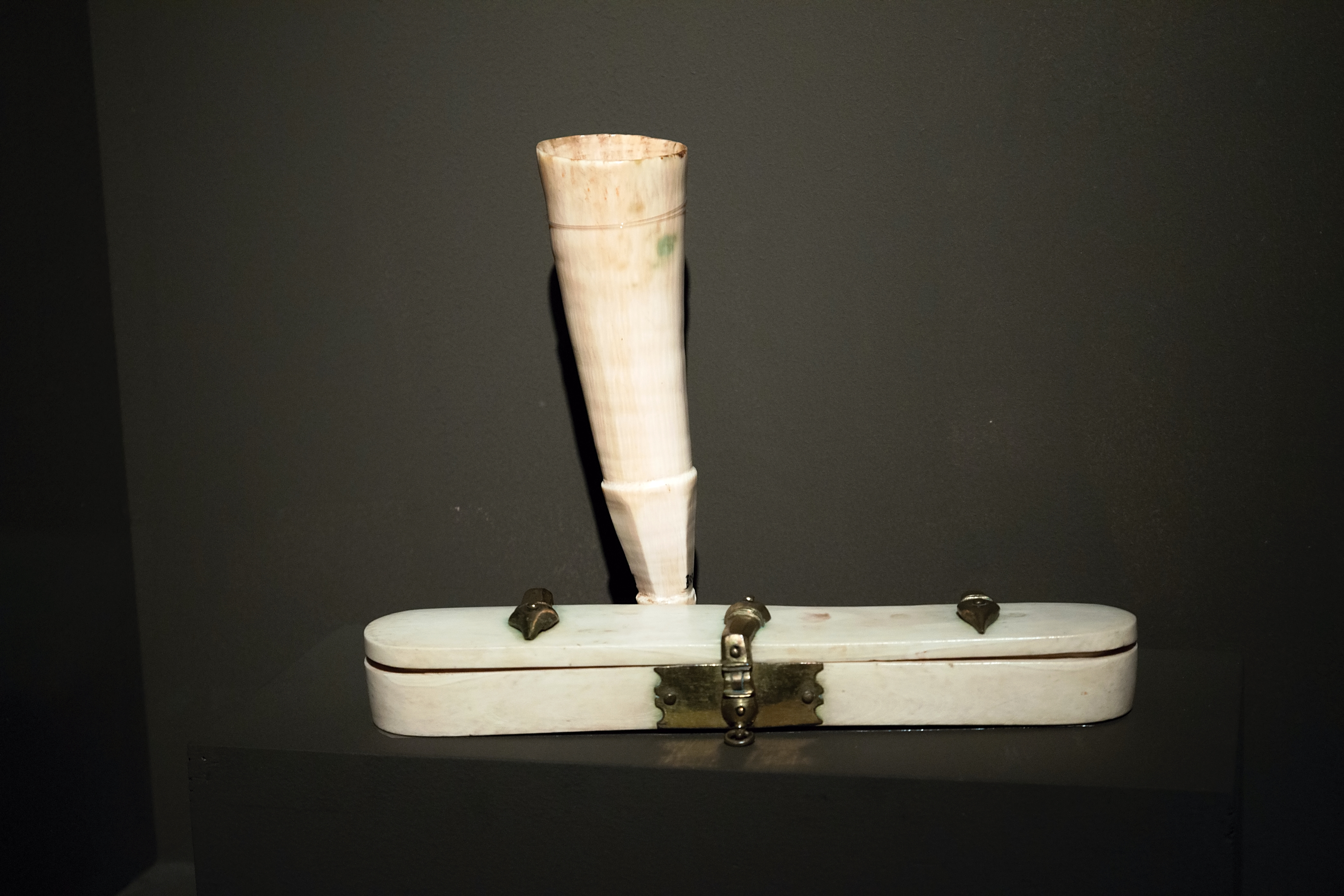
Inkhorn with ivory case (Prague, 9th–13th century)

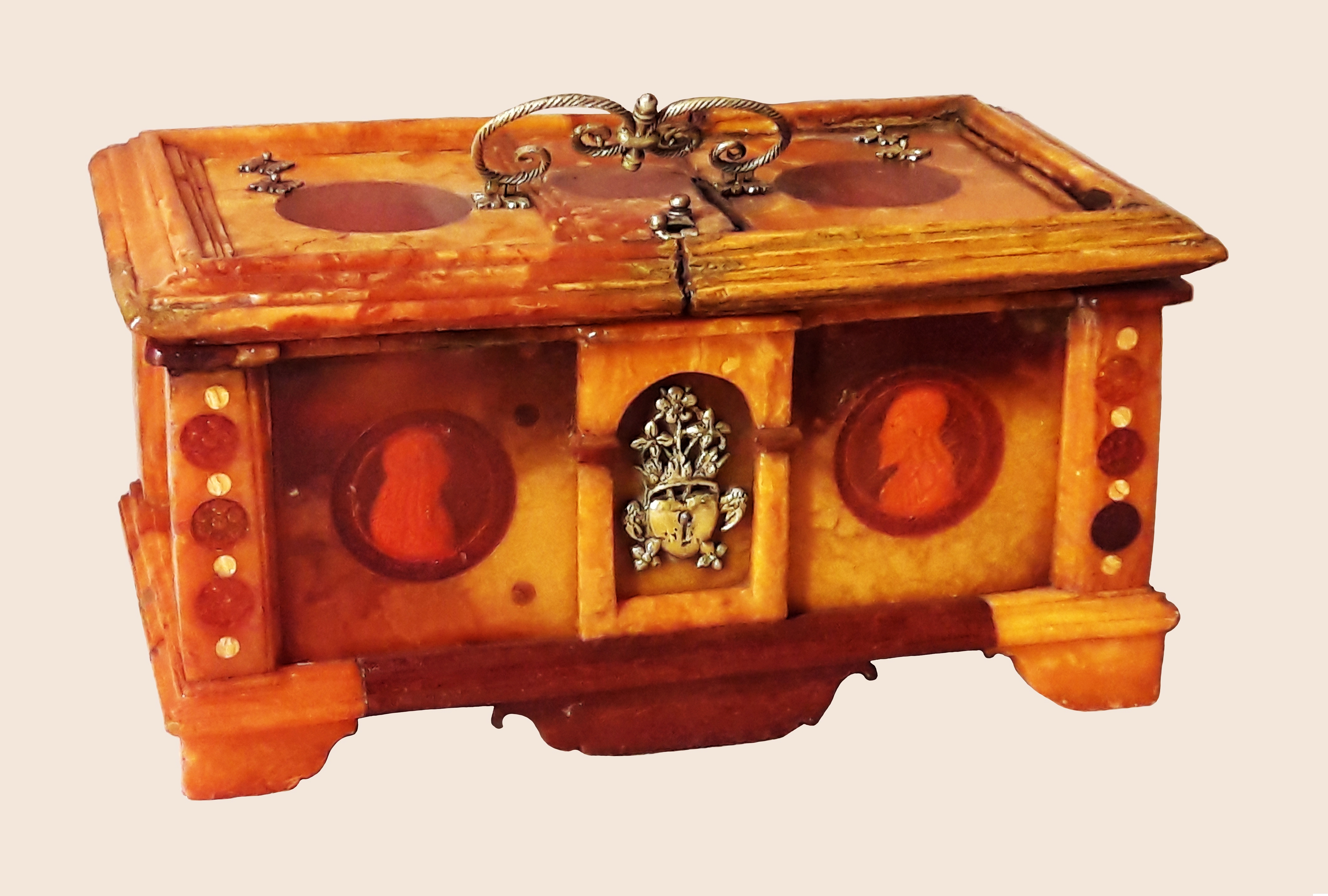
Amber inkwell of king Sigismund III Vasa, 1590s

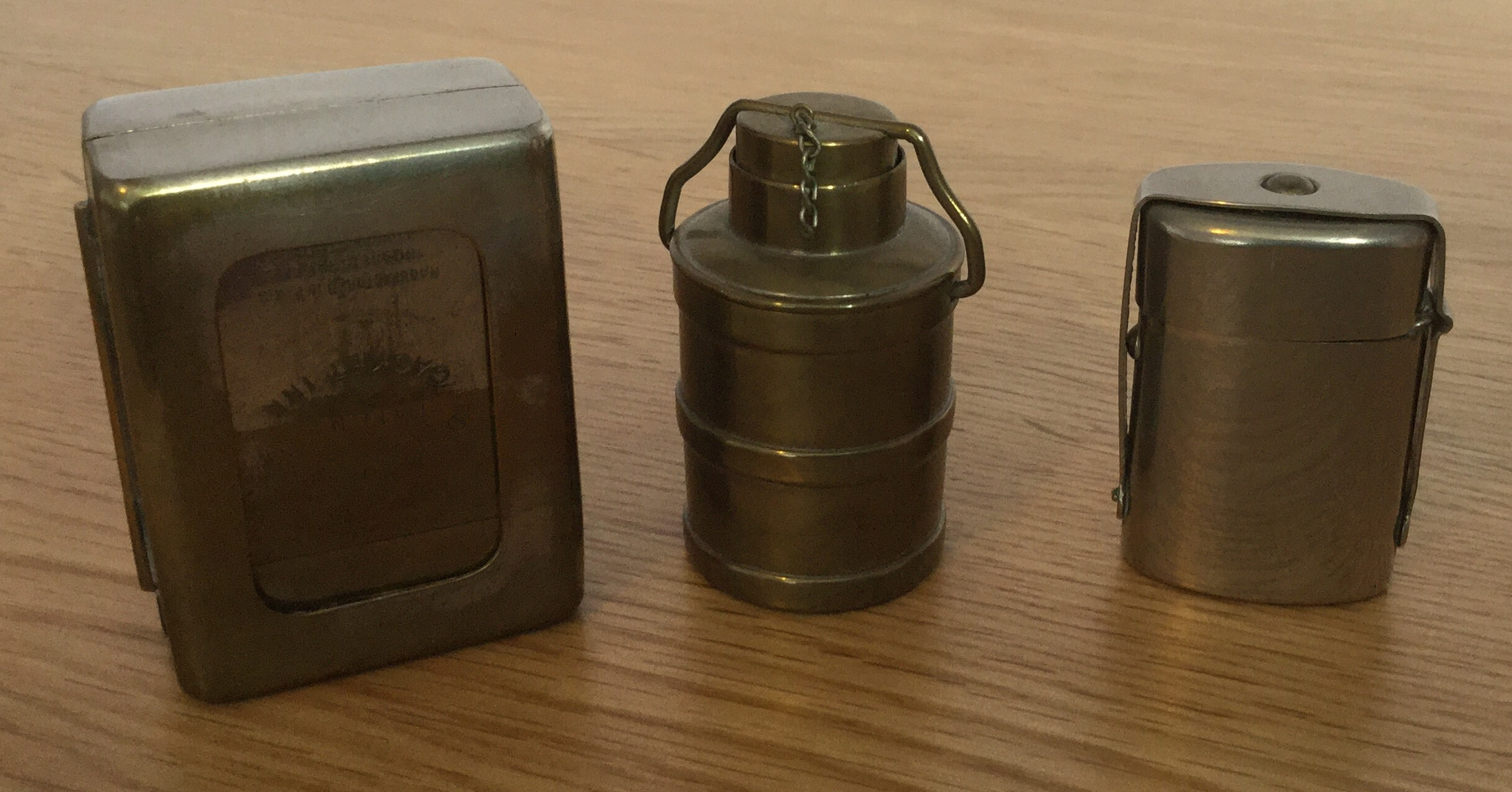
19th century travelling inkwells

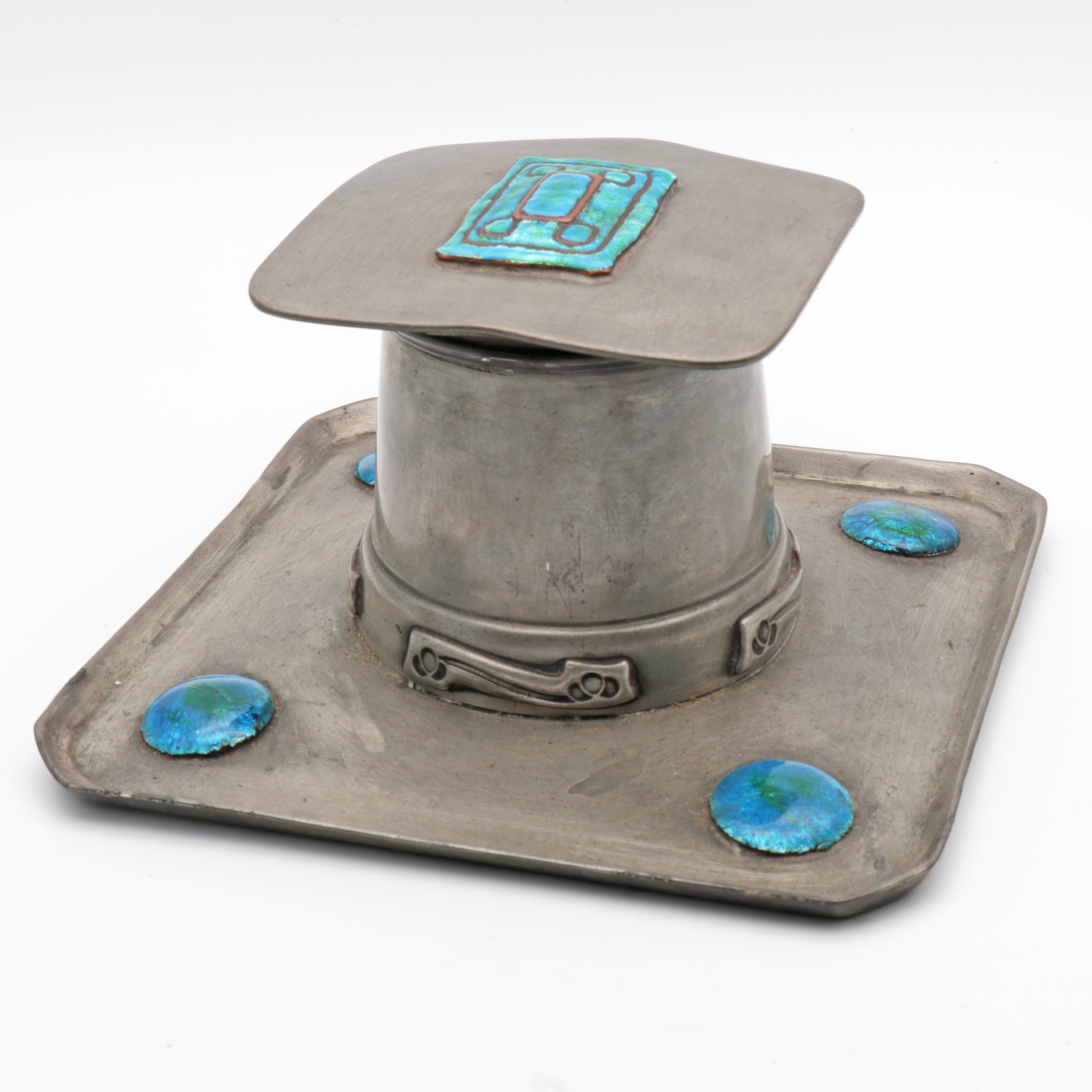
Tudric pewter Inkwell

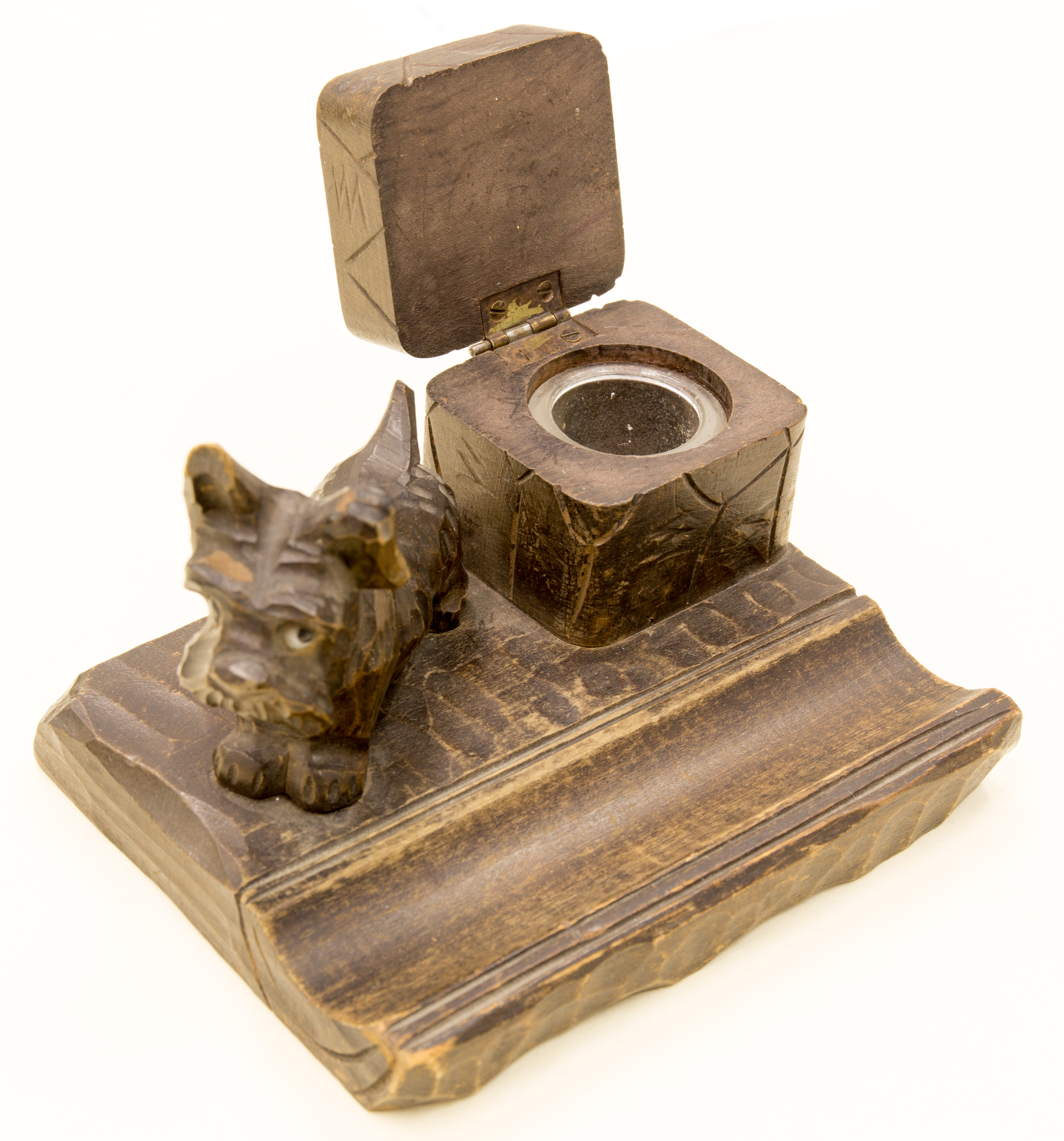
Inkwell with a dog

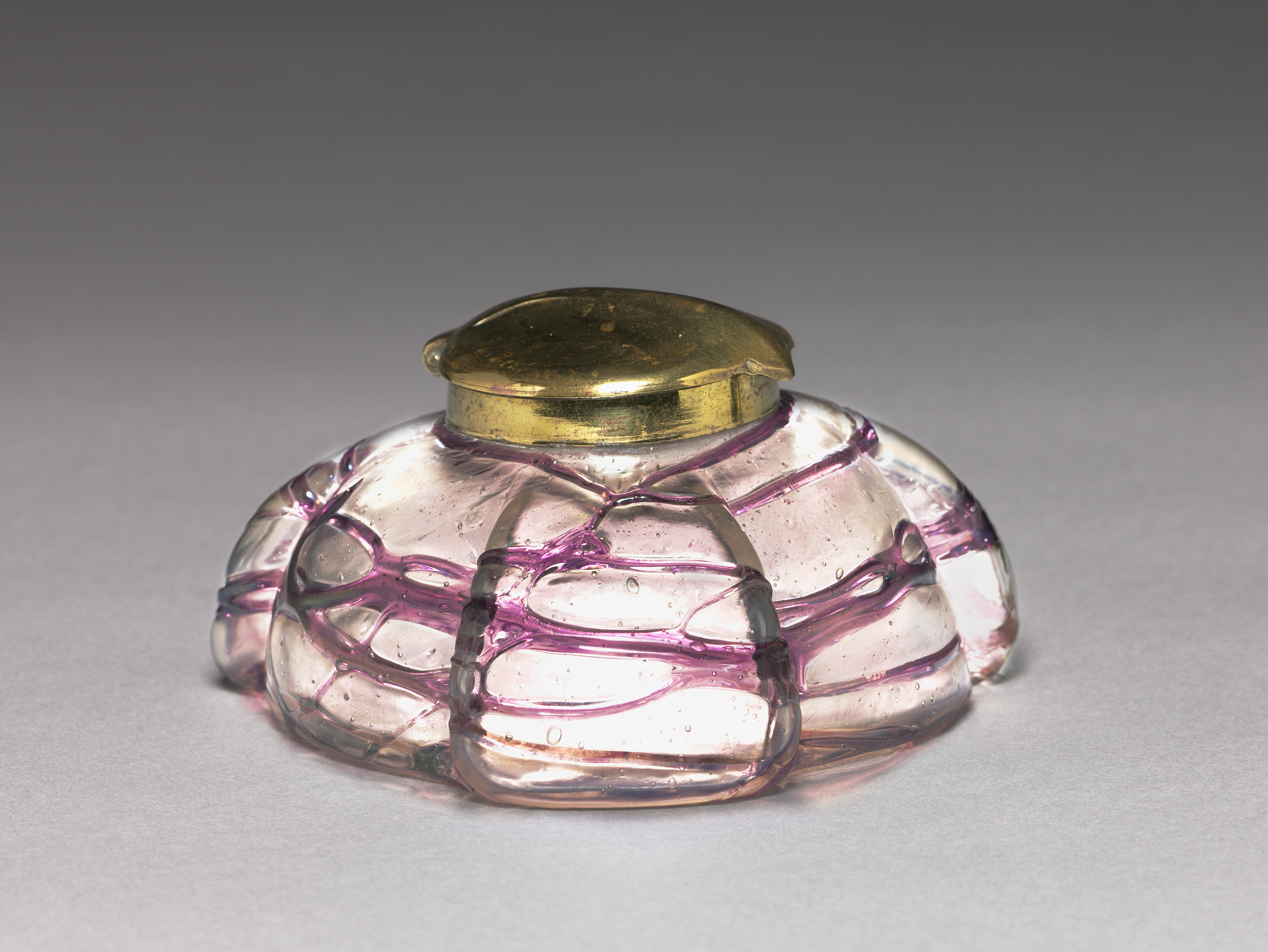
Glass inkwell

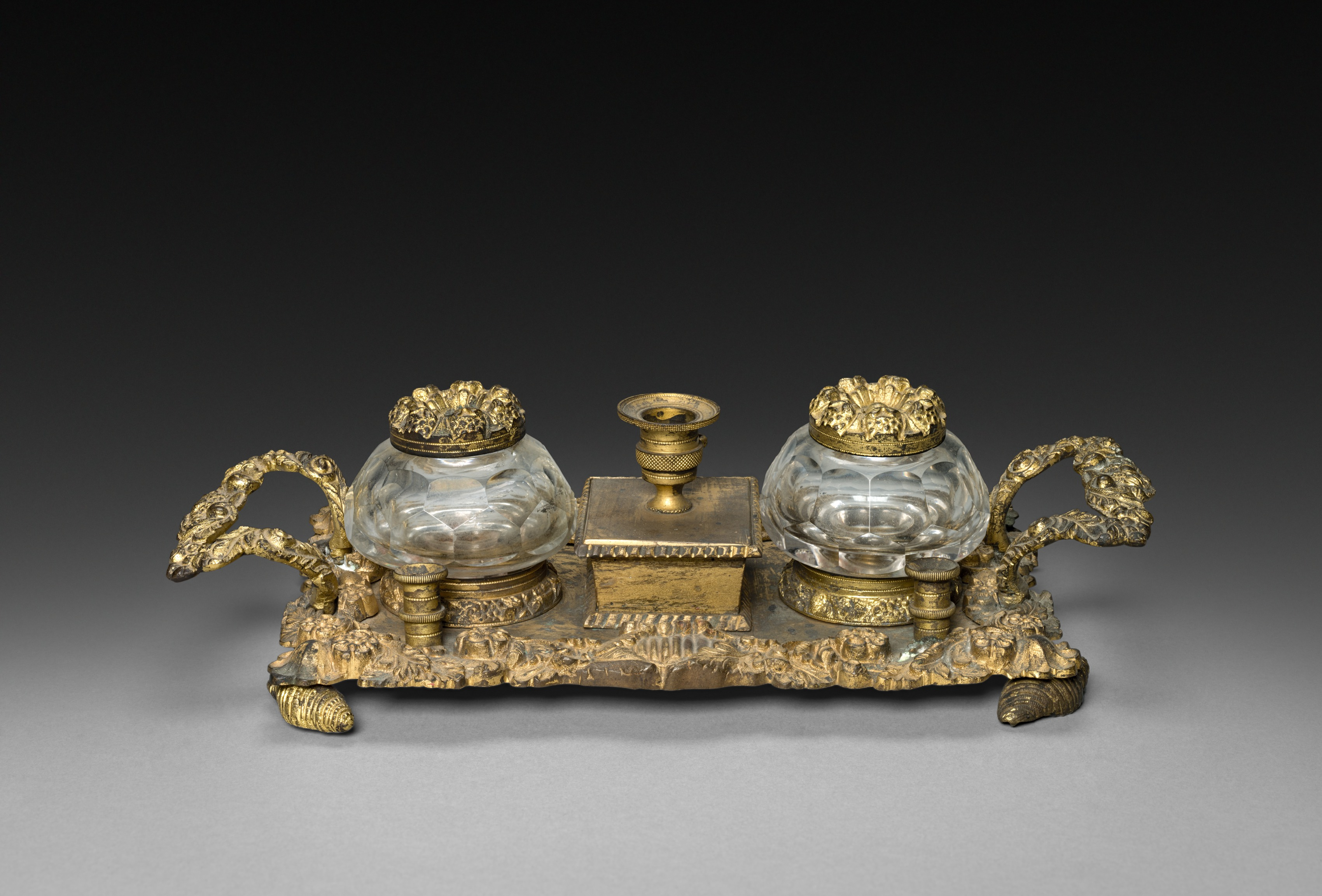
Inkwell set

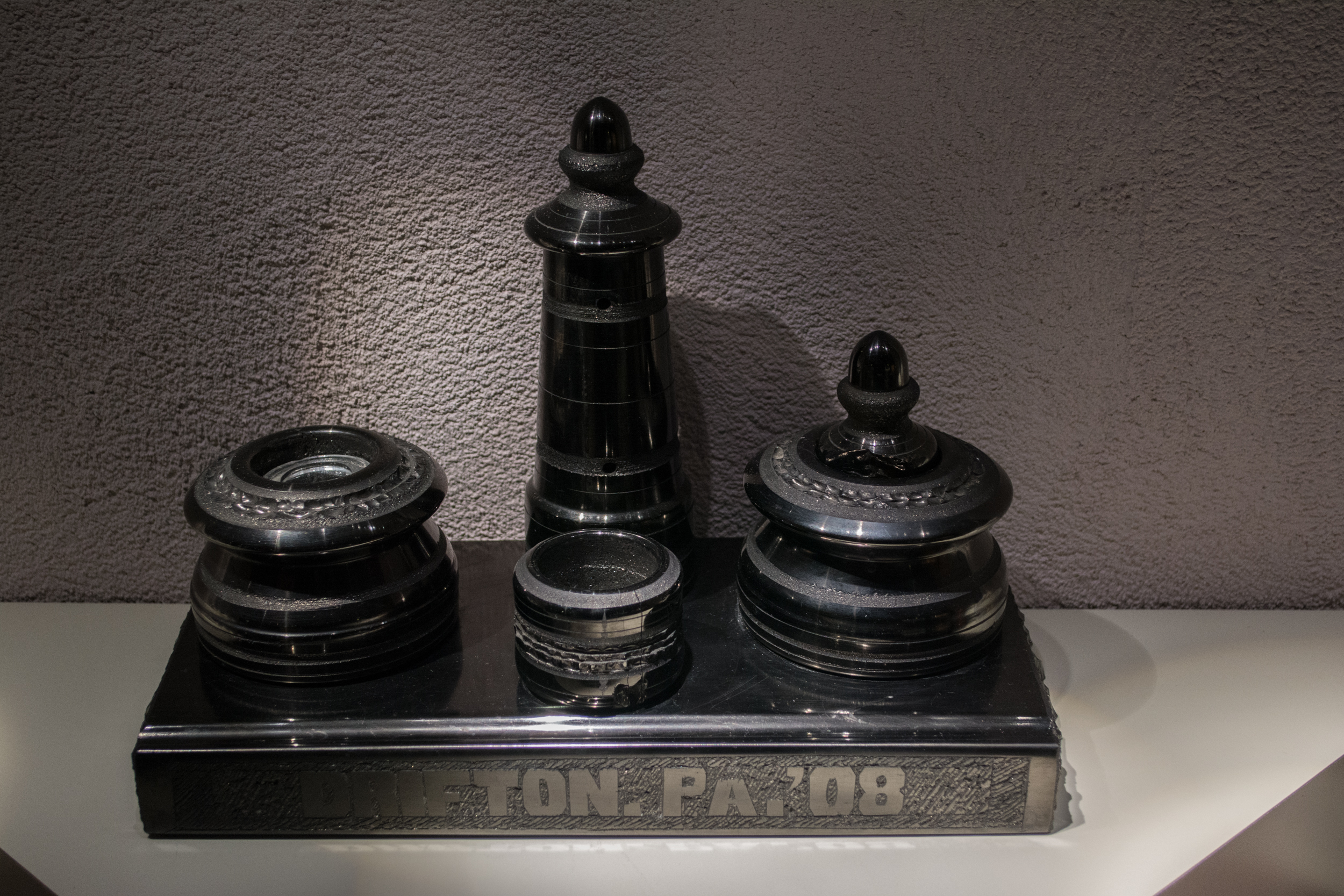
Inkwell carved from anthracite

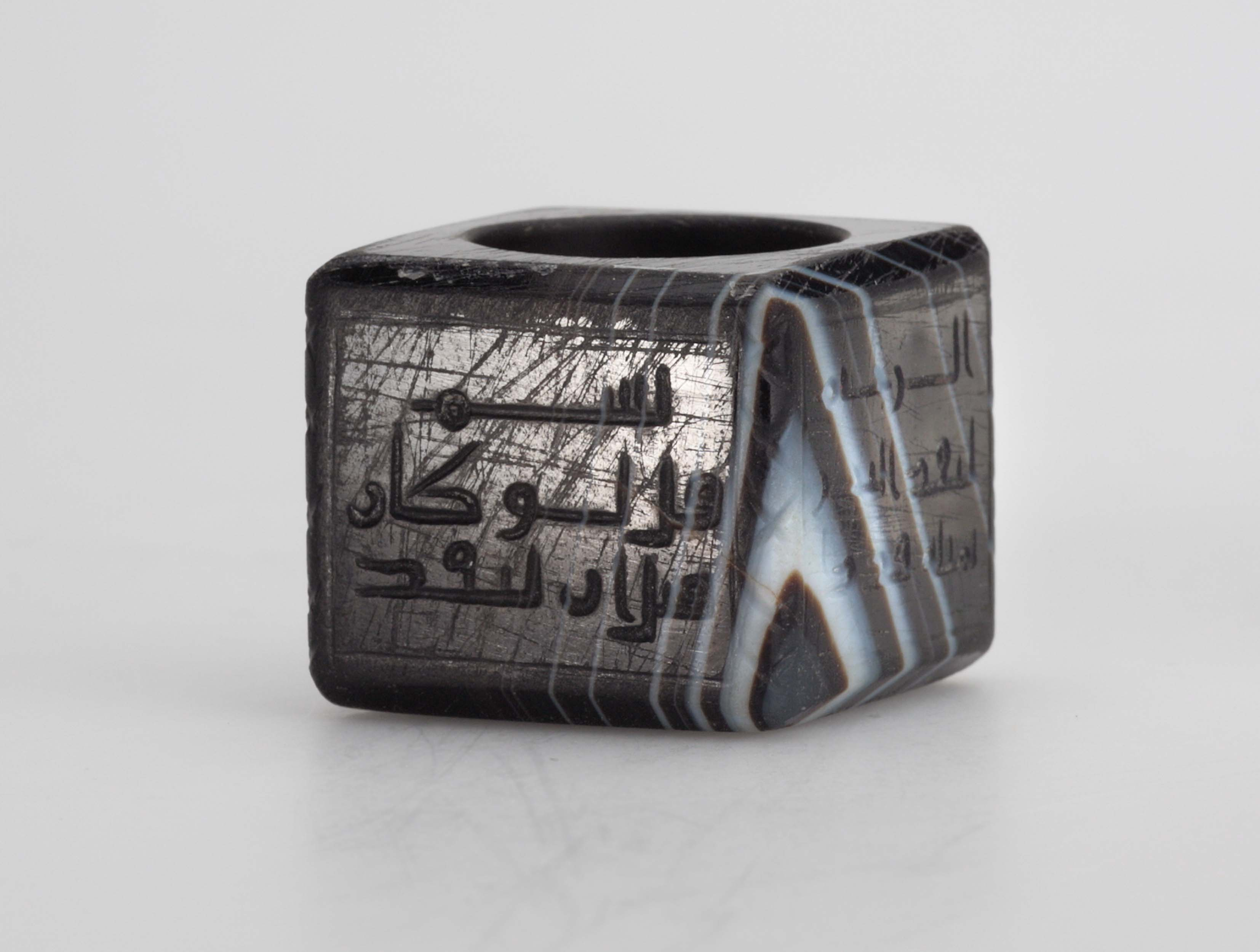
10th century medieval Islamic agate inkwell inscribed with Kufic script

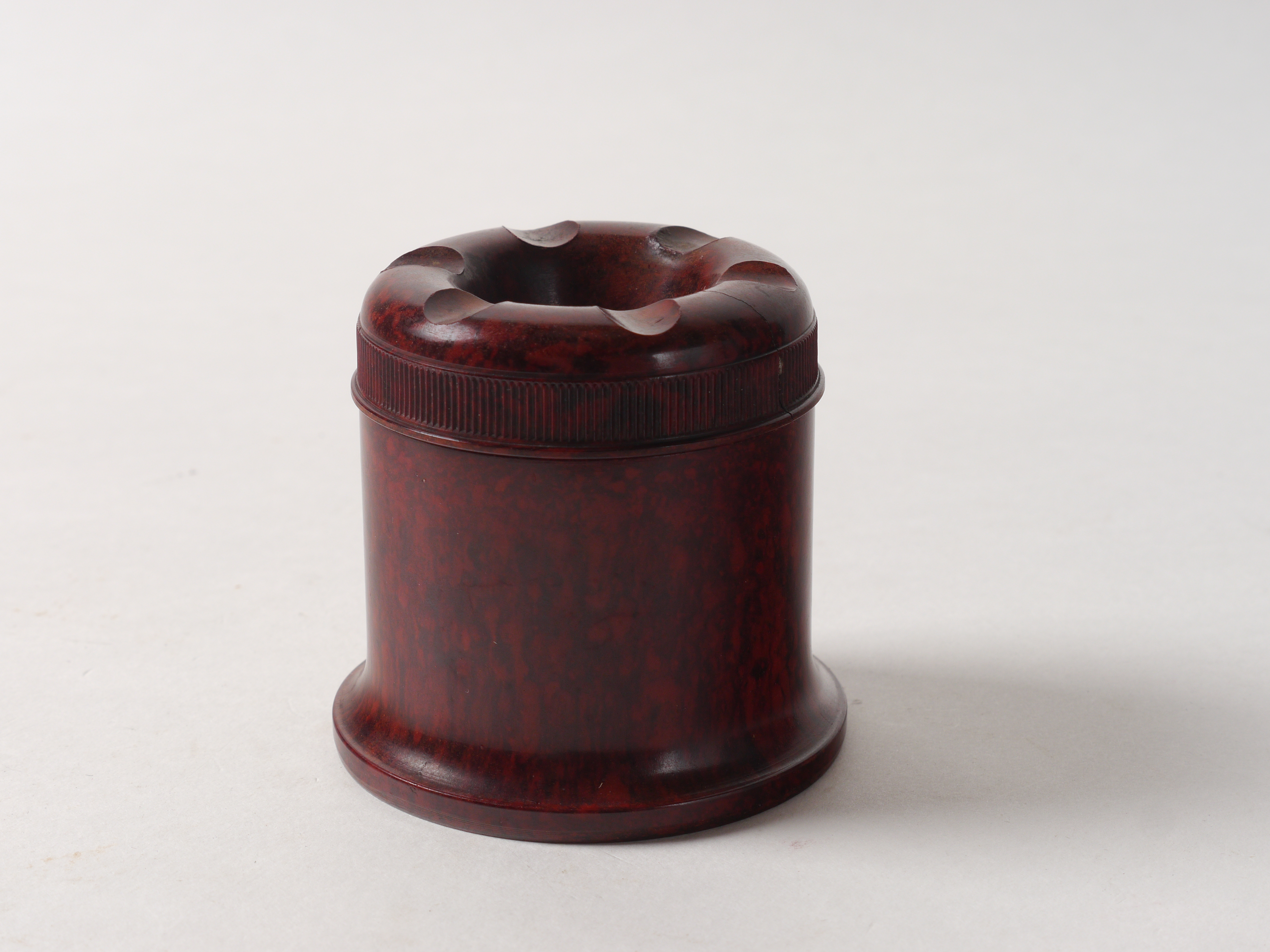
Inkwell with screw cap

Green terracotta Roman inkwell

== See also ==
- Calligraphy
- Syng inkstand

== Bibliography ==
- The Collector's World of Inkwells, Jean & Franklin Hunting, Schiffer Publishing Ltd ISBN 0-7643-1102-6
- The Write Stuff Inkwells Pens & Desk Accessories, Ray & Bevy Jaegers, Krause Publications ISBN 0-930625-86-2
- McGraw's Book of Antique Inkwells Volume 1, Vincent D McGraw, published privately 1972
- Edwardian Shopping 1898–1913 selection facsimile, Army & Navy Stores, David & Charles ISBN 0-7153-7068-5
- Pens & Writing Equipment, Jim Marshall, Miller's ISBN 1-84000-066-X
- English Silver Hallmarks, Judith Bannister, W Foulsham & Co Ltd ISBN 0-572-01181-4
- Handbook of Pottery & Porcelain Marks, J P Cushion, Faber & Faber Ltd ISBN 0-571-04922-2
- Walter's Inkwells of 1885 Book 1, Leo G Walter, published privately 1968
- Inkbottles & Inkwells, William E Covill Jnr, William S Sullwold 1971
- Inkstands & Inkwells A Collector's Guide, Betty & Ted Rivera, Crown Publishers Inc,ISBN 0-517-50419-7
- Inkwells Identification & Values Book 1, Veldon Badders, Schroeder Publishing Inc, ISBN 0-89145-639-2
- Inkwells Identification & Values Book II, Veldon Badders, Schroeder Publishing Inc, ISBN 1-57432-020-3
- Western Writing Implements, Michael Finlay, Plains Books ISBN 1-872477-00-3
- Writing Antiques, George Mell, Shire Publications Ltd ISBN 0-85263-519-2
- Writing Implements & Accessories, Joyce Irene Whalley, David & Charles ISBN 0-7153-6903-2
- Yesterday's Shopping 1907 facsimile, Army & Navy Stores, David & Charles ISBN 0-7153-4692-X
- The Story of Writing, Donald Jackson, Studio Vista ISBN 0-289-70985-7
- The Enormous File, A Social History of the Office, Alan Delgado, John Murray ISBN 0-7195-3612-X
- Doulton Ink Wares, Colin Roberts, BEE Publications ISBN 0-9520547-0-1
- Ink, Glue, Polish and Blacking Bottles, A Collector's Dictionary, 1750-1950, Guy Burch, Mistletoe Towny 2023 ISBN 978-0-9957956-1-7
- De Vito, C., Medeghini, L., Mignardi, S., Coletti, F., & Contino, A. (2017). (Rome, Italy): Production technology. Journal of the European Ceramic Society, 37(4), 1779–1788. 10.1016/j.jeurceramsoc.2016.11.044
