= Arthur Lasenby Liberty =

London merchant, and the founder of Liberty & Co. (1843–1917)

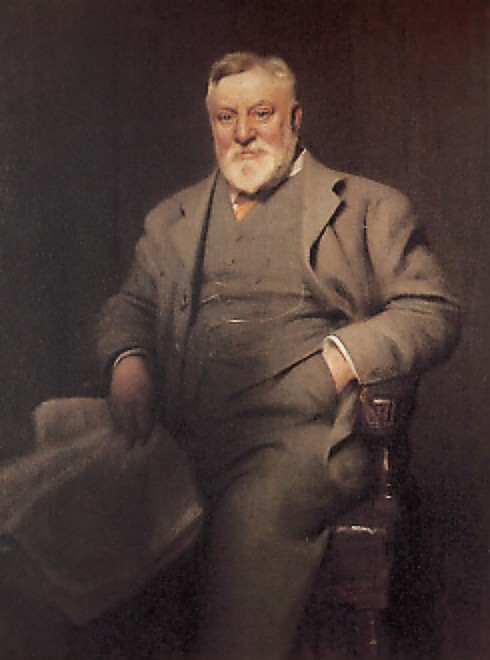
- Portrait of Liberty by Arthur Hacker (1913)
- Born: 13 August 1843; Chesham, England
- Died: 11 May 1917 (aged 73)
- Occupation: Merchant
- Known for: Founding Liberty & Co
- Spouses: Martha Cottam (m. 1865; div. 1869) Emma Louise Blackmore (m. 1875)

Sir Arthur Lasenby Liberty (13 August 1843 – 11 May 1917) was a British merchant, and the founder of Liberty & Co.

== Early life ==
Arthur Liberty was born on 13 August 1843 in Chesham, Buckinghamshire, England, the son of a draper. He began work at sixteen with an uncle who sold lace, and later another uncle who sold wine. By 1859 he was apprenticed to a draper, but he instead took a job at Farmer & Rogers, which specialised in women's fashions. He quickly rose to the post of manager of the warehouse.

== Liberty & Co. ==
After Farmer & Rogers refused to make him a partner in their business, Liberty, in 1875, opened his own shop, Liberty & Co., in Regent Street, London. There he sold ornaments, fabrics and miscellaneous objets d'art from the Far East.

Liberty & Co. initially provided an eclectic mix of popular styles, but went on to develop a fundamentally different style closely linked to the Aesthetic Movement of the 1890s, Art Nouveau (the "new art"). The company became synonymous with this new style to the extent that in Italy, Art Nouveau became known as Stile Liberty after the London shop. The company's printed and dyed fabrics, particularly silks and satins, were notable for their subtle and "artistic" colours and highly esteemed as dress material, especially during the decades from 1890 to 1920.

Arthur Liberty married first Martha Cottam in 1865, from whom he obtained a divorce in 1869 on the grounds of her adultery and second, Emma Louise Blackmore in 1875. They had no children. He was knighted in 1913.

== Death and legacy ==
Liberty died on 11 May 1917. Before he died, he had amassed a small fortune as a majority shareholder in Liberty & Co., which had become a public limited liability company in 1890. He left a manor house, several cottages and a large area of farmland near his birthplace in Buckinghamshire. His gravestone was designed by Archibald Knox, one of Liberty & Co.'s long-standing designers.

== References and sources ==
Sources

- Levy, Mervyn (1986) Liberty Style, The Classic Years, 1898–1910. New York: Rizzoli.

Honorary titles
Preceded by Sir Philip Rose	High Sheriff of Buckinghamshire; 1899	Succeeded by Sir Robert Harvey
