= Onia (clothing) =

American swimwear and lifestyle brand

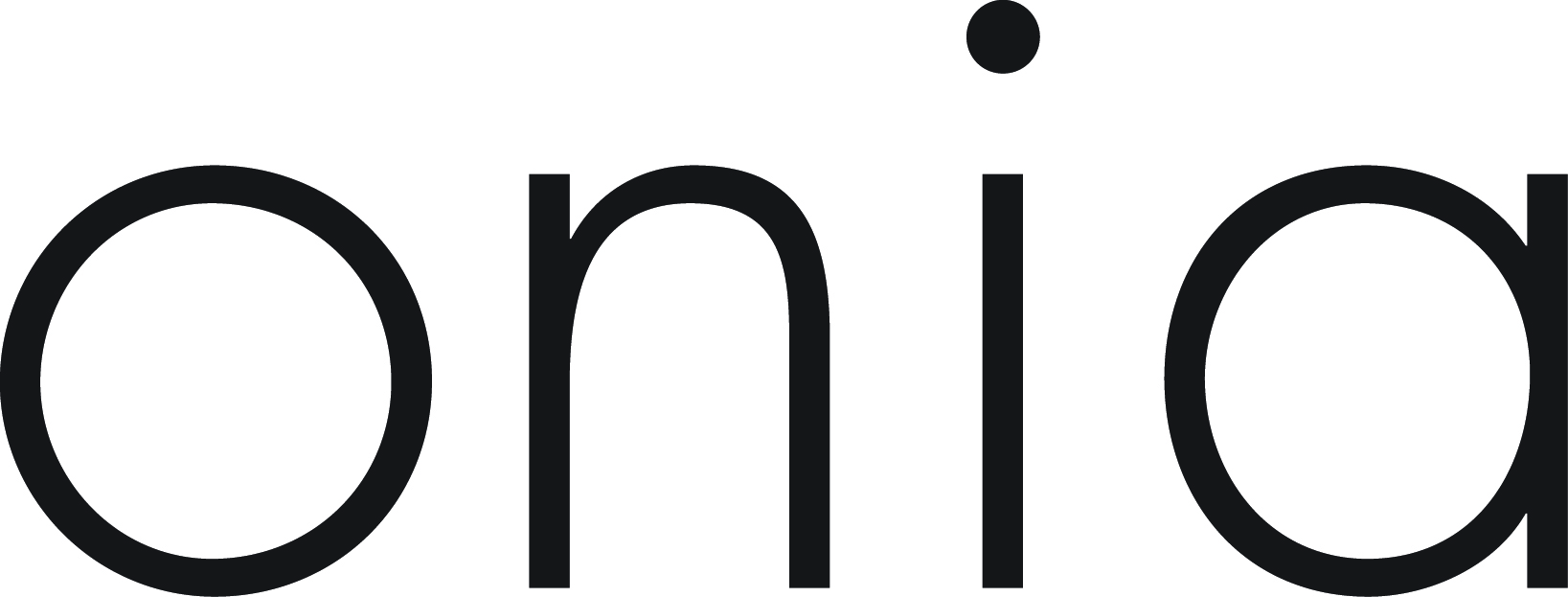
- Type: Private
- Industry: Apparel
- Founded: 2009; 17 years ago
- Founders: Carl Cunow; Nathan Romano
- Headquarters: New York City, U.S.
- Products: Swimwear; resortwear; ready-to-wear
- Website: onia.com

Onia is an American clothing company based in New York City that produces luxury swimwear, resortwear and lifestyle apparel. It was founded in 2009 by Carl Cunow and Nathan Romano.

== History ==
Onia was launched as an online business in 2009 by Carl Cunow and Nathan Romano. The company initially built a men's and boys' swimwear business, and in 2014 announced its expansion into the women's swimwear and resortwear market.

In 2013, Onia expanded its collection to include men's casual wear. In 2015, Onia launched women's swim and ready to wear. In December 2015, Onia launched on Mr. Porter. In 2019 the brand moved into licensing acquiring the men's license for Body Glove.

In 2019, Onia moved into licensing, acquiring the men's swim license for Body Glove from Marquee Brands, which had owned the label since 2016. At the time, the company's portfolio also included a private-label business for department stores and a mid-tier label called Trunk and Surf, alongside the luxury Onia line.

Onia has been featured in The New York Times, The Wall Street Journal, Forbes, Women's Wear Daily, and men's fashion publications such as GQ and Detail.

In the fall of 2022, Onia's new Air Linen Camp shirts line became popular and was endorsed by Esquire Magazine.

== Products ==
Onia is known primarily for luxury swimwear and resortwear, with swimsuits retailing for around $175. In January 2022, the brand introduced its first activewear collection.

== Retail and distribution ==
Onia opened its first retail store, a two-level flagship at 962 Madison Avenue in Manhattan, on March 12, 2020, days before COVID-19 lockdowns took effect in the United States. During the pandemic the company introduced same-day delivery for Manhattan residents

== Collaborations ==
Onia has an ongoing collaboration with Liberty Art Fabrics, who supplies fabrics for much of Onia's swimwear. Onia has also collaborated with Ritz-Carlton Hotel Company and other resorts to create towels for resort guests.

Onia has entered into a multi-year licensing agreement with WeWoreWhat's Danielle Bernstein. Their recent Italy collection sold nearly $2 million in swimwear within 12 Hours.

Onia runs third-party distribution among brands such as Club Monaco, Theory, Mr. Porter and Net-a-Porter. In 2019 they are launching wholesale distribution for WeWoreWhat as a standalone brand at Coterie.
