= Tudric =

Art Nouveau pewter ware designed for Liberty of London

Tudric is a brand name for pewterware made by W. H. Haseler's of Birmingham for Liberty & Co. of London. In 1899 Liberty began to produce the Cymric gold and silver ranges of domestic ware and jewellery inset with semi-precious stones. From 1903 Haseler's began producing Tudric pewter ware for Liberty's and continued to the 1930s though the arrangement between Liberty's and Haseler's ended in 1926. Tudric ware included teapots, caddies, jugs, tankards, dishes, photo frames, candlesticks, napkin rings, powder boxes and vases among other things. The designs use Art Nouveau and Celtic Revival styles.

Designers included Archibald Knox, A.H. Jones, Bernard Cuzner, Arthur Gaskin, David Veasey, Reginald (Rex) Silver, Jessie M. King and Oliver Baker.

Tudric pewter differed from other pewters with better quality, it had higher content of silver. Pewter is traditionally known as "the poor man's silver".

== Gallery ==
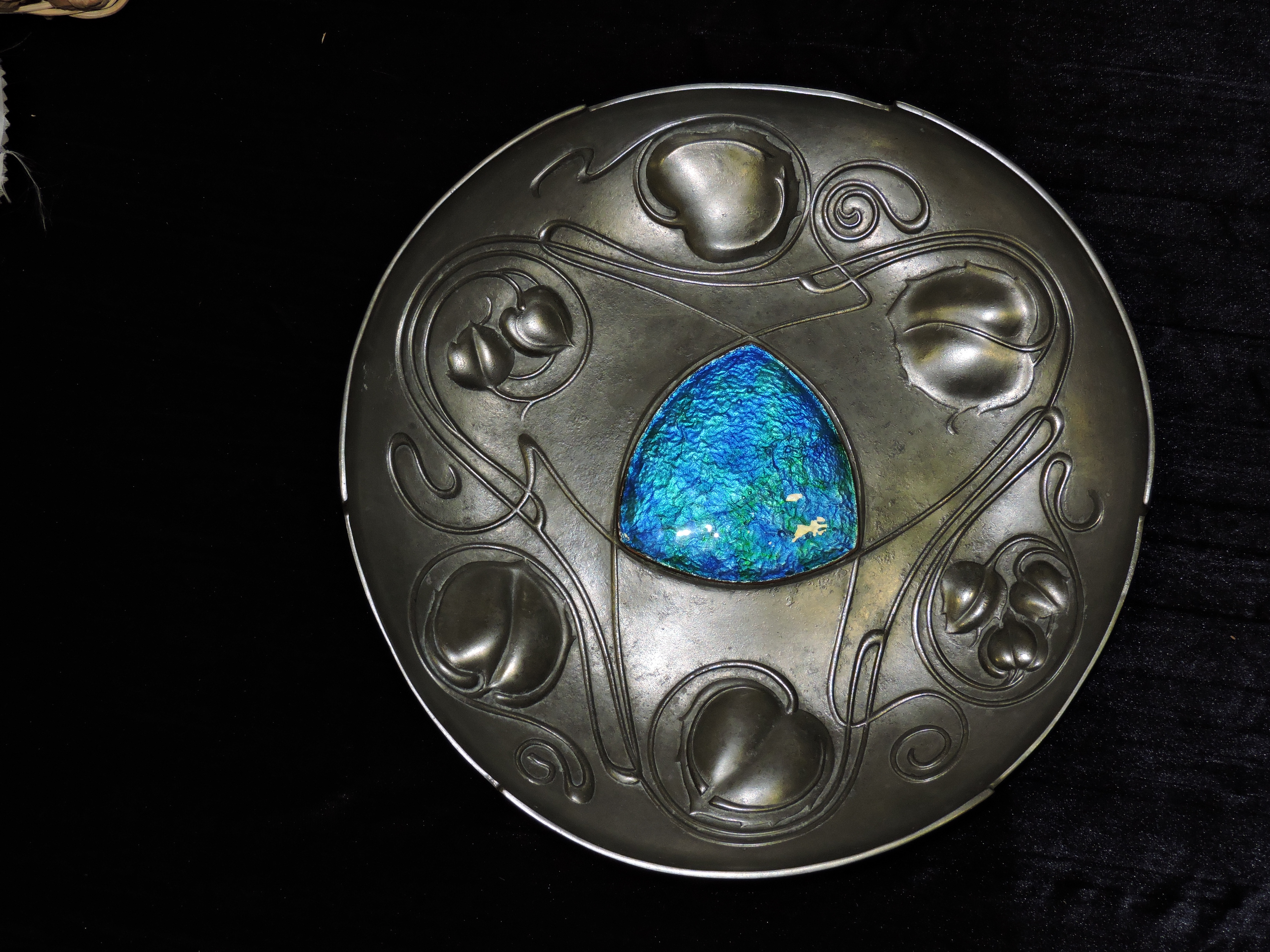
'Bollelin' pewter & enamel plate (design 044).

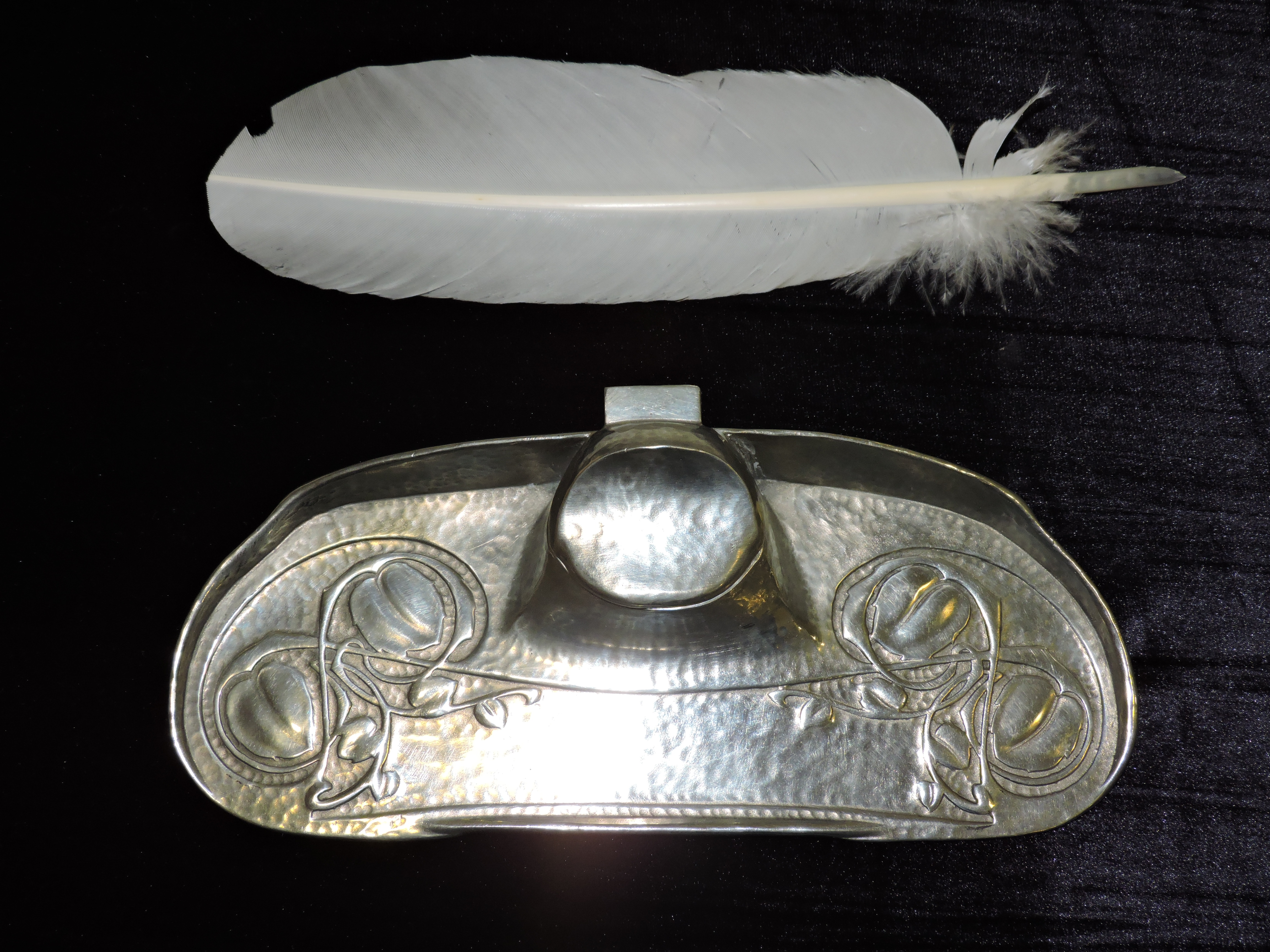
Inkwell with typical hammered finish (design 0404).

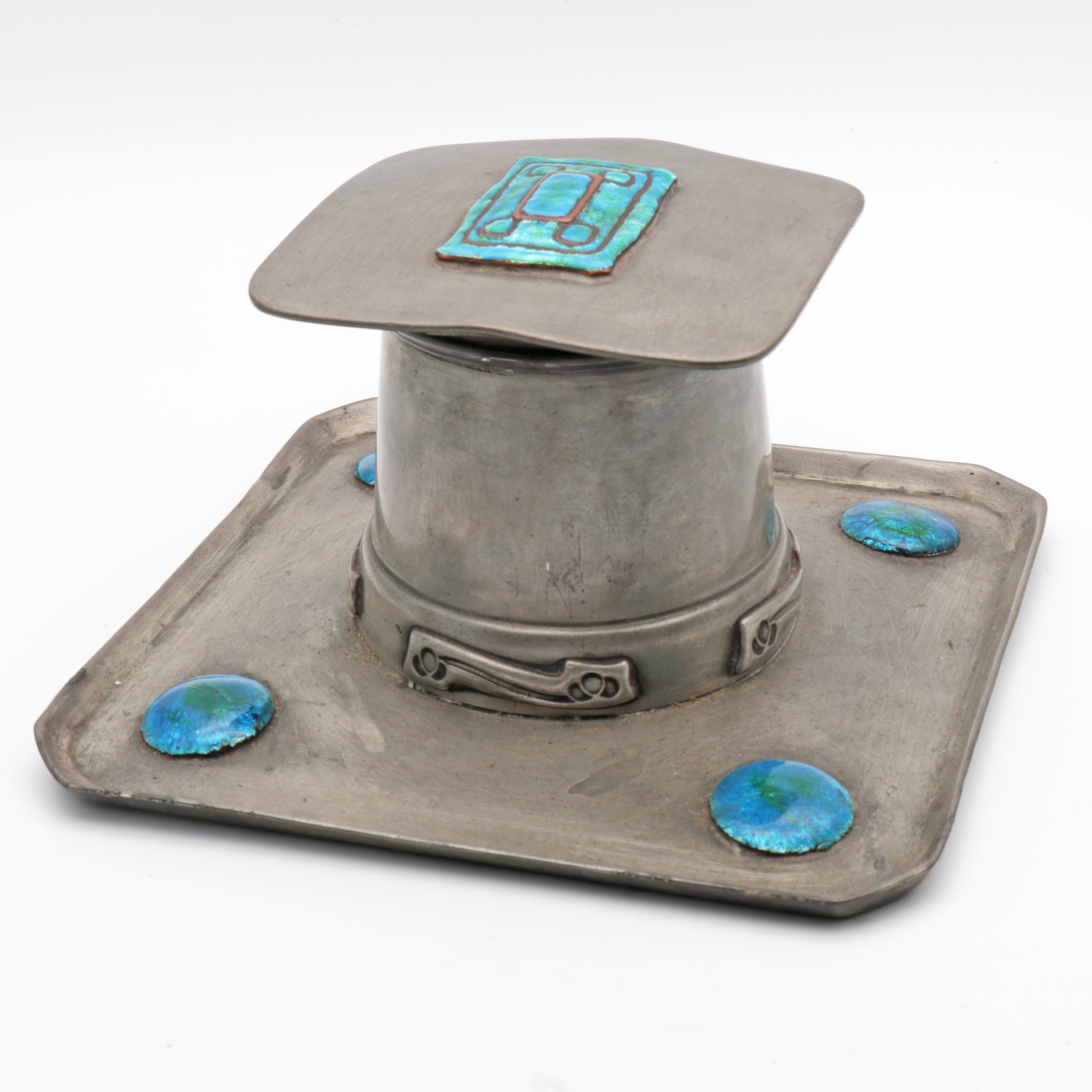
Pewter inkwell with enamel (design 0141)

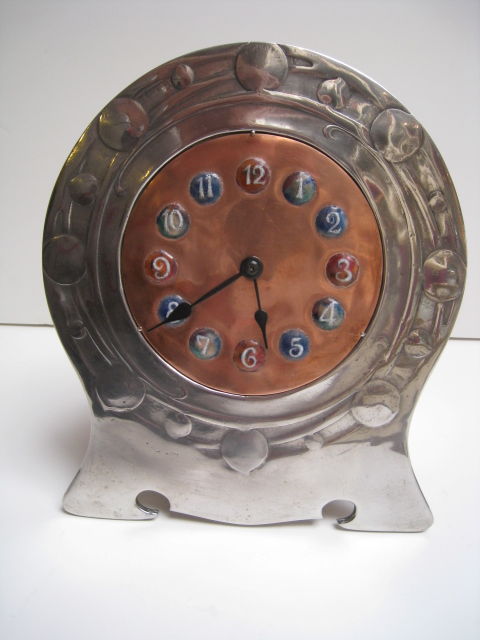
Clock (design 0366)

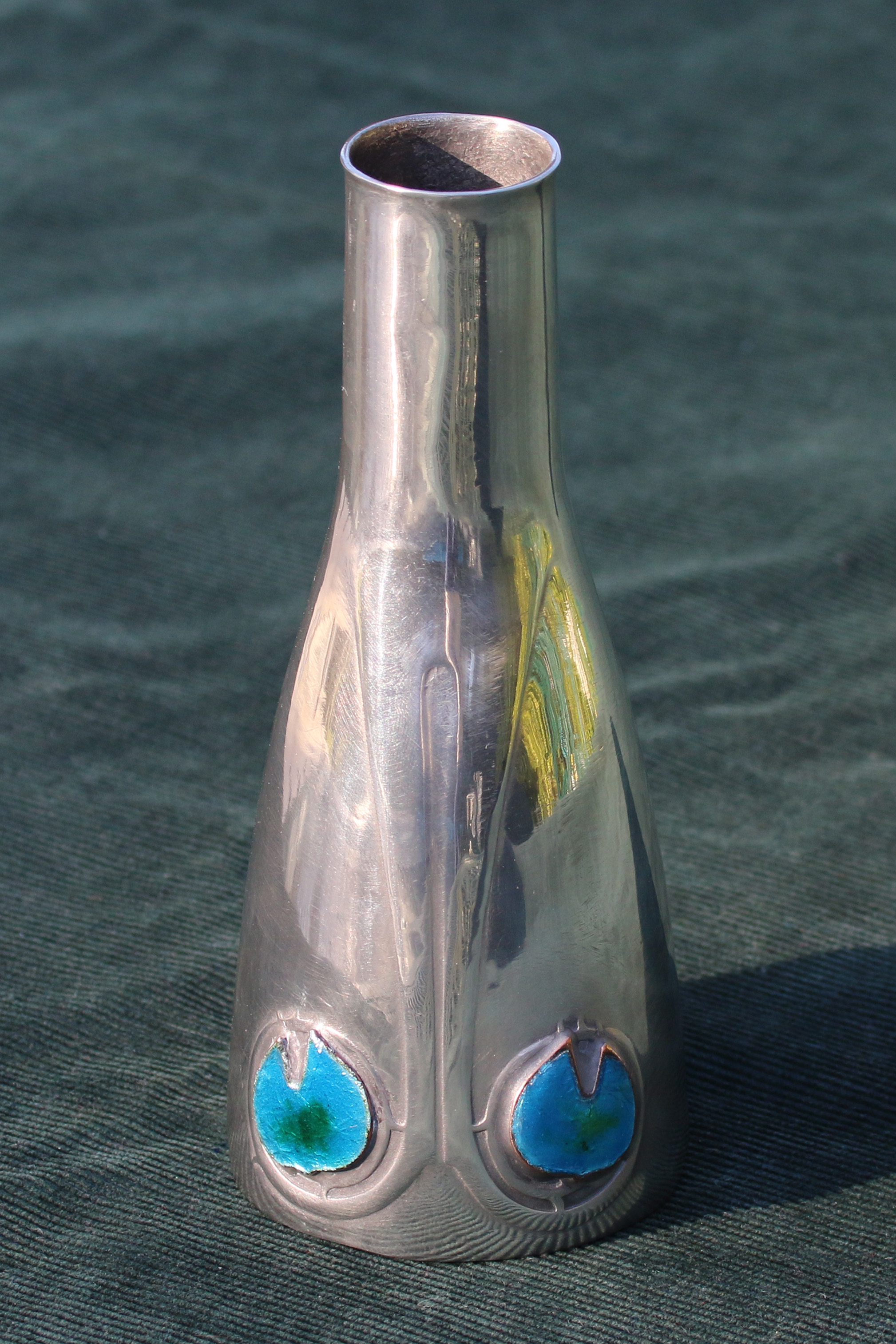
Vase (design 0323)
