= Talwin Morris =

British book designer and decorative artist

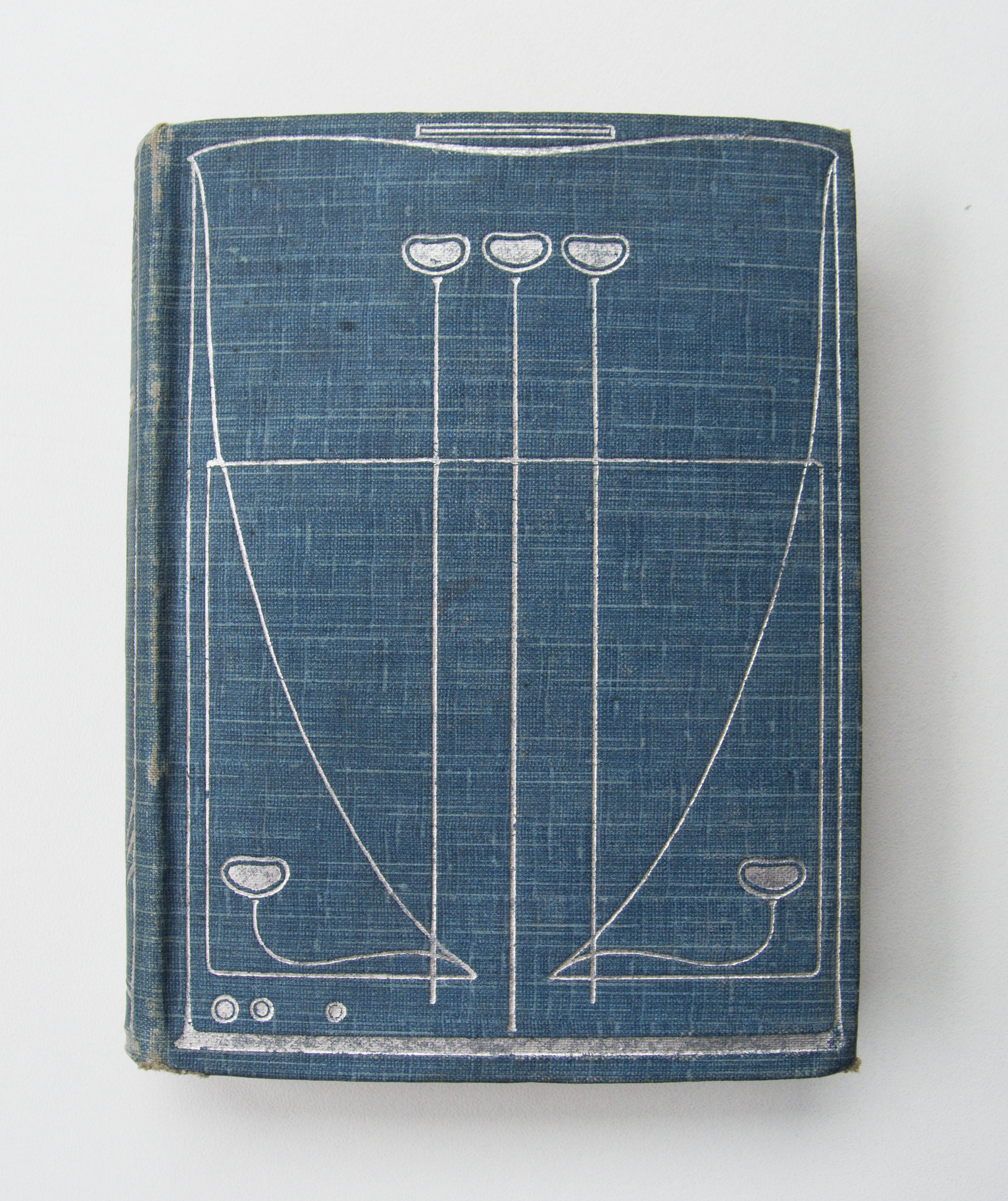
- Born: 14 June 1865; Winchester, England
- Died: 29 March 1911 (aged 45); Bowling, Scotland
- Other names: Talwyn Morris
- Occupation: Designer
- Known for: Book design

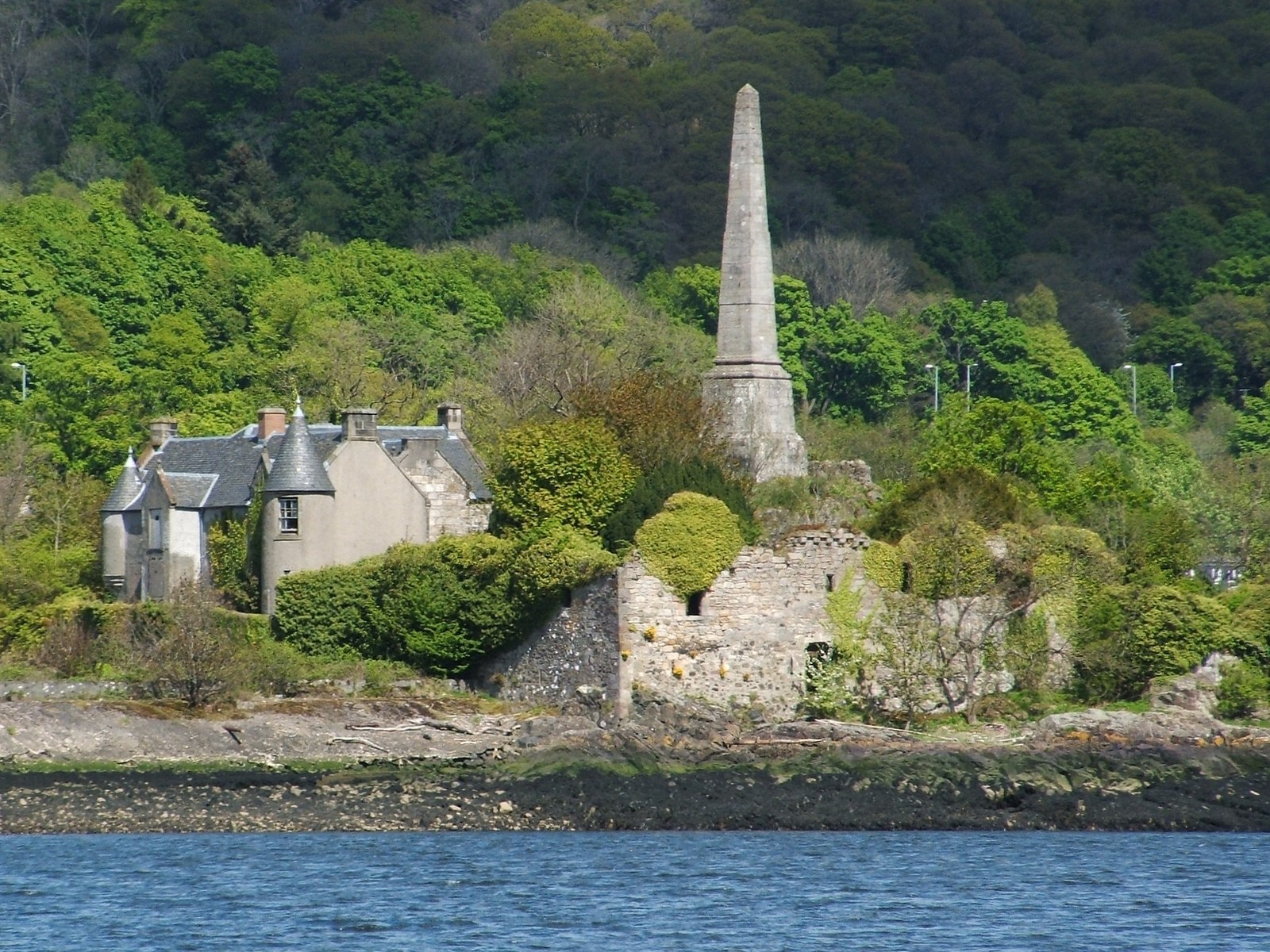
Dunglass Castle -home of Talwin and Alice Morris

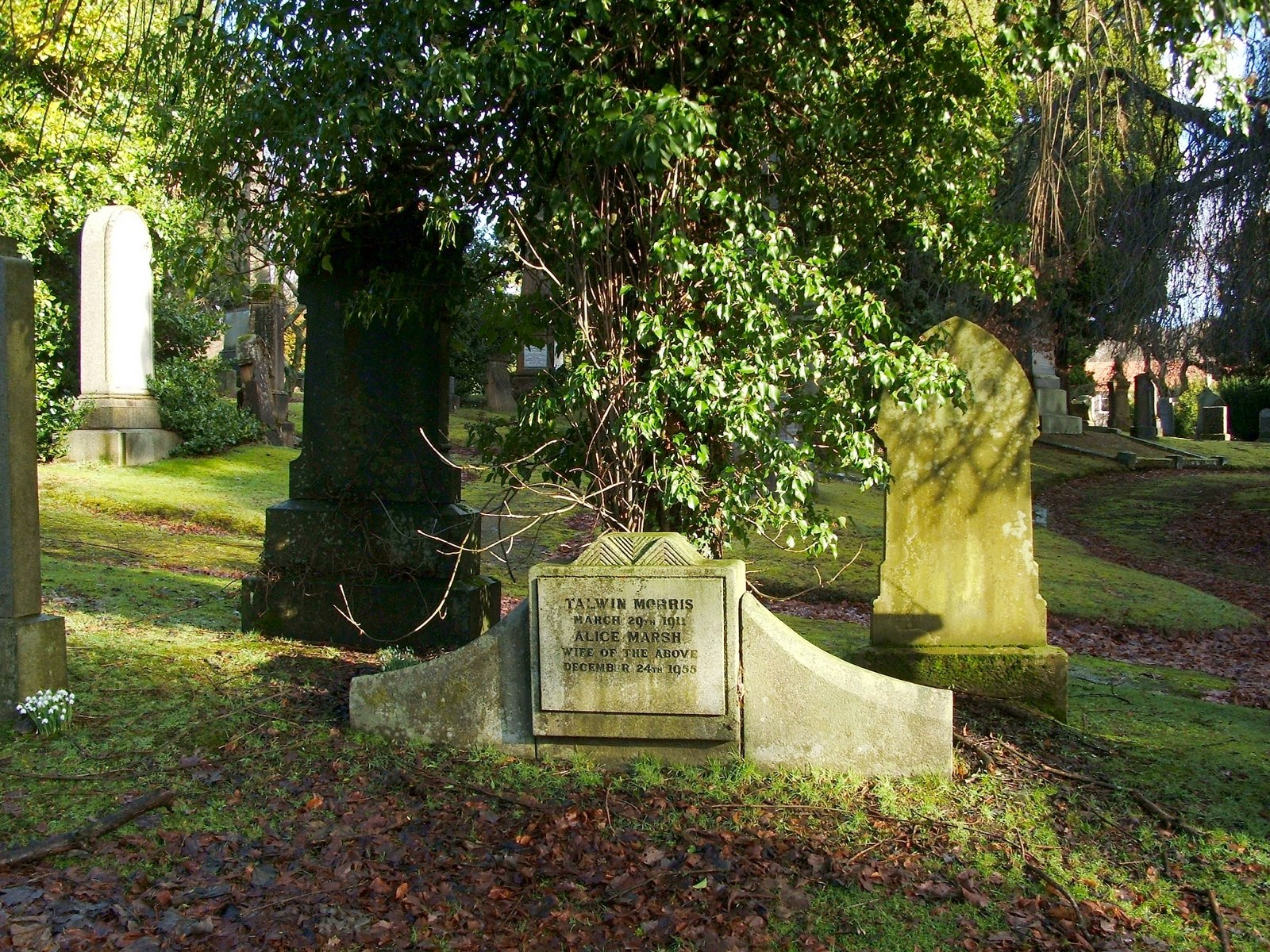
Gravestone of Talwin Morris -designed by Charles Rennie Mackintosh -Dumbarton

Talwin Morris (15 June 1865 – 29 March 1911) was a prolific book designer and decorative artist working in the late 19th and early 20th centuries, particularly known for his Glasgow Style furniture, metalwork and book designs.

== Early life and career ==
Morris was born 15 June 1865 in Winchester, England to auctioneer Thomas Shewell Morris (1832–1877) and Harriet Chick (d.1865) of St John's Place. Talwin, from the Welsh 'tal' (tall) and 'gwyn' (white), had been the surname of his paternal great-grandmother, a quaker from Royston in Hertfordshire. His mother died from complications just 24 days after his birth, and his aunt Emily (1829-1916) moved from Reading, Berkshire to look after him.

Upon his father's death in 1877, and aged 12, he was placed in the guardianship of Emily and her brother Joseph Morris (1836–1913) in Reading, Berkshire. Possibly affected by his father's illness, Emily noted that between June 1874 and Christmas 1877 Talwin had suffered "a nervous illness... said by the medical man to have been a phase of hysteria". Chosen for a theological career by Emily, from 21 September 1880 he attended Second's House of Lancing College in West Sussex, notably playing the role of Lady Plato in John Baldwin Blackstone's farce A Rough Diamond, before withdrawing from his studies in April 1882.

A photographic portrait in the Lancing archives has been tentatively identified as Morris, but this attribution is unsubstantiated. He was later described however by artist Mary Newbery Sturrock (1892-1985) as "a tall pale-complexioned man, who favoured the dress of the artist of the day, in cloak and wide-brimmed hat".

Between 1882 and 1885 he was articled to the architectural firm his uncle Joseph Morris ran with Spencer Slingsby Smallwood at 9 Friar Street in Reading, Berkshire, winning a prize in 1885 in the Berkshire Archaeological and Architectural Society's drawings competition. The practice specialised in church architecture, and Morris's sketchbooks from this time are full of renderings of Norman doorways, fonts and arches from the surrounding villages of Tidmarsh, Purley on Thames, Swallowfield, Silchester, Cholsey, Finchampstead and White Waltham. Today some of these sketches are held in the collection of Glasgow Museums. Following his apprenticeship, he obtained work in London between 1885 and 1890 with architect James Martin Brooks (1859-1903). Despite this training he seems not to have registered with the Royal Institute of British Architects.

In 1888 he became engaged to his second cousin Alice Marsh (1861–1955), daughter of Joseph, a miller and Justice of the Peace for Kingston upon Thames, and Ellen Grace Marsh. Alice would later go on to enjoy her own highly successful career as an author of children's books under the name Alice Talwin Morris.

From 1891 he took up post as sub art-editor under M. H. Spielmann for Black and White, a new weekly magazine published by Cassell, designing many of its decorative initials and headpieces., the first of which appeared on 3 October 1891 to illustrate a review of The American by Henry James. Here Morris provides a letter T with swirling nasturtiums, though the incorporated portrait of James is not by him. Other pieces were used to decorate individual stories, or to head up the 'Books' or 'Chess' sections, and were often reused long after Morris left the magazine.

By 1892 he had also designed the masthead of Cassell's Saturday Journal. Around this time he was sharing rooms in Belle Vue Road, Kingston upon Thames with his second cousin, the miller and collector Ernest Marsh (1843-1945). On 21 May 1892 he and Alice finally married at St John's Parish Church in Kingston upon Thames, with his occupation listed on the marriage certificate as 'clerk'. The marriage certificate was witnessed by his aunt Emily, Ernest Marsh, and members of Alice's immediate family. They lived at 1 Field Court, Gray's Inn, London, a short walk from the offices of Black and White at 33 Bouverie Street.

== Move to Glasgow ==
Responding to an advertisement placed in The Standard on 21 February 1893 for an Art Director for publishers Blackie and Son, he moved to Glasgow in May 1893. The advert specified "a competent draughtsman well versed in art matters, of some taste in literature, fitted to take charge of the scheming and production of book illustrations and decoration and able to carry on the correspondence concerned therewith". Whilst working for Blackie and Son, Morris continued to accept freelance commissions, such as mastheads for the popular Cassell periodical Magazine of Art.

Morris soon made the acquaintance of the artists and designers associated with the Glasgow School of Art via Robert Blackie (1820-1896) who sat on the committee of the School from 1871 to 1892. Although he never attended the School, Morris soon became friends with Charles Rennie Mackintosh and his contemporaries, and his own work quickly began to incorporate Glasgow Style motifs. He is known, for example, to have visited the art studio of the sisters Frances Macdonald and Margaret Macdonald at 128 Hope Street. Around 1897 Morris wrote an unpublished manuscript (commonly considered a piece for Studio Magazine) Concerning the Work of Margaret Macdonald, Frances Macdonald, Charles Mackintosh and Herbert McNair: an Appreciation which is now held by Glasgow Museums.

Responding to an advert of 1 March in the Glasgow Herald, he and Alice leased Dunglass Castle from July 1893 and began to design its interiors. Morris is also known to have been a keen collector of Martinware ceramics, a passion he shared with his cousin Ernest Marsh. Bookplates designed by Talwin and Alice at that time are generally thought to reflect the circumstances of their new home and life together. The house was sold in July 1899 to Charles Macdonald, brother of his friends Margaret and Frances Macdonald, and Morris's interiors were subsequently completely remodelled by Mackintosh. Today, Dunglass Castle sits derelict within an oil refinery and is classified as a Building at Risk.

The Morrisses moved to the newly built Torwood in Bowling, West Dunbartonshire where Morris could enjoy a garden studio. He is incorrectly listed as Dalwin Morris in the 1901 census, and employed a domestic servant called Elizabeth Gourlay. Artist Mary Newbery Sturrock later recalled visiting the Morrisses as a little girl, and picking primroses on the hill at Torwood. Mackintosh also visited, and drew flowers in the garden.

== Influence on book design ==
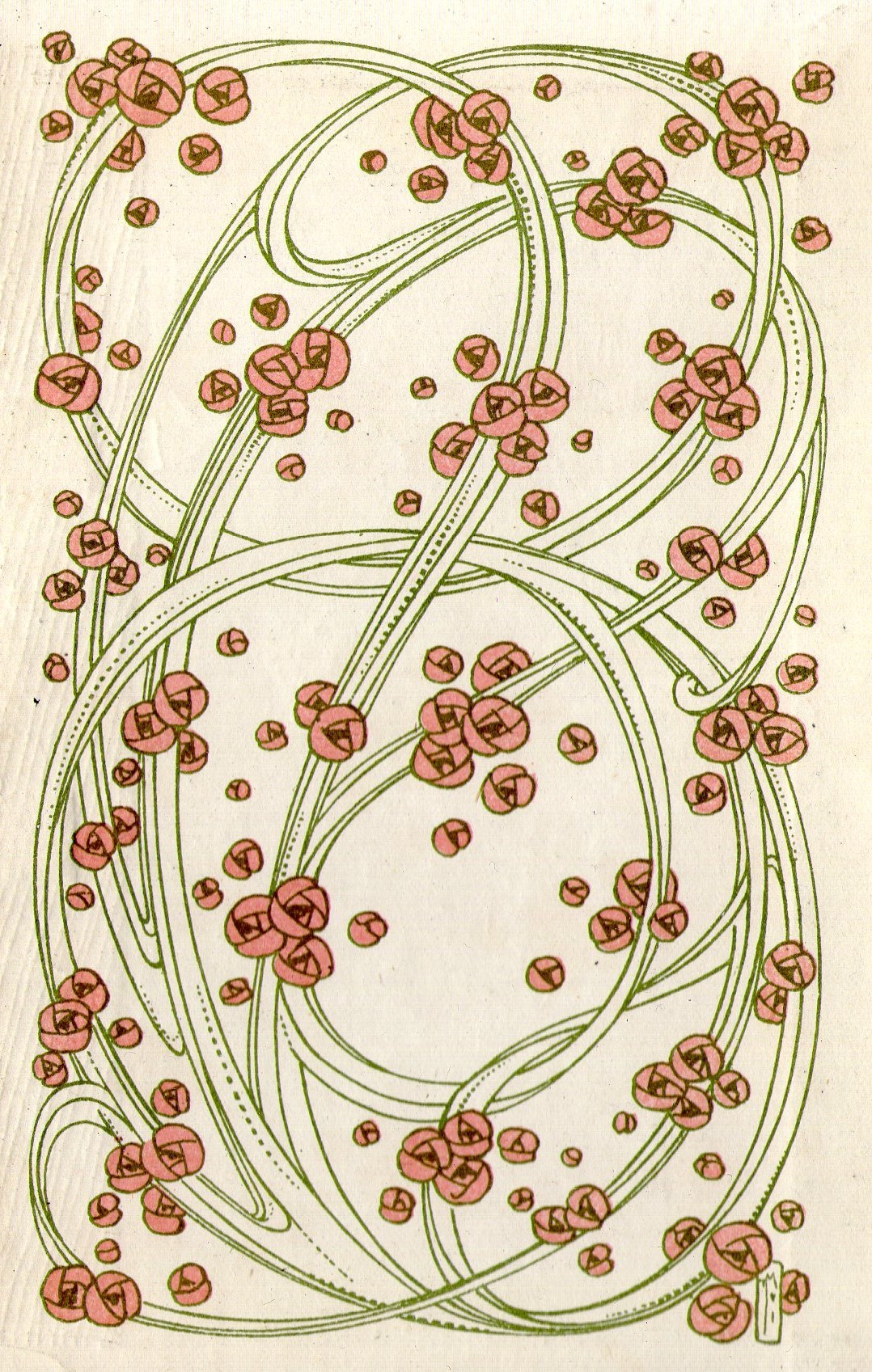
Endpaper, circa 1905

From 5 October-5 December 1896 Morris exhibited three book cover designs (The Universe, English Essays, and Daddy Samuel's Darling) at the fifth exhibition of the Arts and Crafts Exhibition Society at the New Gallery, London. Morris became hugely influential in Victorian book design by moving away from the popular narrative bindings of the time to a more modern Art Nouveau approach where line, curve and decoration are used to entice the reader. The book designs of Dante Gabriel Rossetti have been cited as a particular influence.

At Blackie and Son his output was prolific, producing many designs that could be printed in different colourways across series such as the Red Letter Library and Library of Famous Books. He also designed books for Morison Brothers of Glasgow, Cassell, J. G. Cotta of Stuttgart, J. C. C. Bruns of Minden, F. Volckmar, Mudie's Select Library, and from 1898 the Blackie subsidiary Gresham. In 1906 he also supplied the cover design of the influential German magazine Dekorative Kunst.

Though many of his book designs are unsigned, some feature his 'signature' of a single dot followed, after a pause, by a further two dots (a stylised rendition of his initials in morse code which would consist of a long dash followed by two shorted dashes). Others feature a stylised elongated TM monogram. During his tenure, Morris also commissioned book designs by designers such as Ethel Larcombe and Silver Studio.

== Non-book design ==
From 1893 Morris designed brass metalwork and textiles for his home Dunglass Castle, and several pieces now reside in the collection of the Hunterian Museum and Art Gallery. His interior scheme at Dunglass later featured in an article for Studio Magazine. At the 1896 Arts and Crafts Exhibition he bought the watercolour Part Seen, Part Imagined from his friend Charles Rennie Mackintosh for 3 guineas, and designed his own frame to house the work (now in Glasgow Museums).

In November–December 1900, Morris exhibited a repoussé bronze mirror at the 8th exhibition of the Vienna Secession, organised by the Vereinigung Bildender Künstler Österreichs and curated by Josef Hoffmann. Here his work was shown in room I, as opposed to room X which housed the work of Mackintosh and other Glasgow artists. At the Glasgow International Exhibition of 1901, Charles Rennie Mackintosh designed a pavilion for the department store Pettigrew & Stephens, and Morris provided the accompanying poster.

Around the same period, his work was featured in a special winter number of The Studio on jewellery and fans. Here a jewelled shoe buckle in copper, and a cloak clasp and waist band in beaten silver were featured In 1901 Morris produced designs for a dining room for Mrs Bruno Schroeder, now in Glasgow Museums. Also in 1901 he designed a scheme for a remodelled entrance to the Blackie works (at 17 Stanhope Street in the Townhead area of the city and built by Alexander 'Greek' Thomson), which included a pair of wrought iron grilles, swing doors, a stained glass fanlight, and fingerplates in beaten brass. In later years Agnes Blackie recalled "the appointment in 1892 [sic.] of a disciple of art nouveau, Talwin Morris, as head of the art department, had tangible effect, not only on the design of book covers, but on the appearance of the office at 17 Stanhope Street" Much of the scheme was lost when the Blackie Works were demolished in the 1960s and relocated to Bishopbriggs.

In 1902 his work was selected for exhibition alongside those of his contemporaries at the influential Prima Esposizione Internazionale d'Arte Decorativa Moderna held in Turin, at which he sold a beaten metal mirror and received orders for four more. The 'Scottish Section' had been organised by Francis Henry Newbery, Headmaster of Glasgow School of Art and consisted mostly of Glasgow artists across a suite of three rooms designed by Charles Rennie Mackintosh. Also in 1902 he introduced Charles Rennie Mackintosh to his employer Walter Blackie (1860-1953), which led to Mackintosh receiving the commission to design Blackie's home, Hill House, Helensburgh. Morris's own double candle sconce of a peacock hangs at Hill House.

Around 1903–1904, Morris designed an ink stand in pewter and blue/green enamel for the Tudric range of Liberty & Co. An example is held in the Hunterian Museum and Art Gallery. Designs for an overmantle, dining table, sideboard and bookcase for William Adlington Barrow Cadbury from this time are held in Glasgow Museums.

In 1910, Morris designed the memorial of his employers the Blackie Family in Glasgow Necropolis, which was then carved by John Mossman.

== Death and posthumous reputation ==
Morris retired at the age of 44 through ill-health in 1909 and was succeeded by his deputy A. A. Campbell. He died from a cardiac embolism on 29 March 1911 at just 45 years old, leaving an estate valued at £855 14s 7d. On 31 March 1911, notice of his funeral was published in the Glasgow Herald. His body lies in Dumbarton Cemetery, marked by a gravestone designed by his friend Charles Rennie Mackintosh at the behest of his widow Alice. The inscription reads "Love is more great than we conceive / and death is the keeper of unknown redemptions", taken from the Dominion of Dreams (1899) by Celtic Revival writer Fiona Macleod, a pseudonym of William Sharp. This quotation had previously been used for Macleod's own memorial. At her own wish, Alice's ashes were later to join those of her husband, upon her death in 1955.

His one piece of published writing, the 9th special supplement of Percy Venner Bradshaw's the Press Art School titled The Illustration of Children's Books, was published posthumously in 1912 with an addendum by his successor A. A. Campbell.

In 1911, and again in 1924, books in the possession of his widow Alice were auctioned at Sotheby, Wilkinson & Hodge. In 1939 and 1946 Alice presented works by her late husband to Glasgow Museums. Some of his design work for Blackie was sold at Sotheby's in 1989 in the sale of their archives.

Posthumous exhibitions of Morris's work were held at the William Morris Gallery, London from 23 August-2 October 1983, National Art Library, London from June–July 1990, Blackwell, Lake District from 26 April-11 July 2005, University of Reading from 12 January-20 March 2009, and Court Barn Museum, Chipping Campden from 3 April-17 May 2015. His work across media (including early architectural sketches, metalwork, bookbindings, bookplates, and graphic art) was shown at the exhibition Charles Rennie Mackintosh: Making the Glasgow Style held at Kelvingrove Art Gallery and Museum from 30 March-14 August 2018.

His work can be seen in many library and museum collections, both in the United Kingdom and internationally.

== Bibliography ==
- Talwin Morris: An Annotated Bibliography (2017)

== Digital content ==
- Glasgow School of Art Library's digitised collection at Visual Arts Data Service

== Notable collections ==
- Items held by Glasgow Museums
- Morris Collection at University of Glasgow Library
