= Levetus =

Levetus is a surname. Notable people with the surname include:

- Amelia Sarah Levetus (1853–1938), British-Austrian art historian, journalist, educator and feminist
- Celia Levetus (1874–1936), Canadian-English author, poet and illustrator
- Celia Moss Levetus (1819–1873), English writer
