= Charles Holme =

English journalist and art critic 1848-1923)

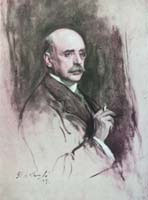
- Portrait of Charles Holme by Philip Alexius de László (1869–1937), published in The Studio in January 1928
- Born: 7 October 1848; Derby, England
- Died: 14 March 1923 (aged 74); Upton Grey, Hampshire, England
- Occupations: merchant; magazine editor
- Known for: The Studio

Charles Holme (/hoʊm/; 1848–1923) was an English journalist and art critic, founding editor of The Studio from 1893. He published a series of books promoting peasant art in the first decades of the twentieth century.

== Life ==
Holme was born on 7 October 1848 in Derby, the younger son of a silk manufacturer, George Holme, and his wife Ann, née Brentnall. Holme himself worked in the silk and wool trades, trading with Turkestan, India and China in the 1870s. He subsequently opened offices in Japan, visiting the country in 1889 with the painter Alfred East and Arthur Lasenby Liberty and his wife. He was vice-president of the Japan Society of the United Kingdom, and was a recipient of the Order of the Rising Sun in 1902. He was a member of a private bibliophile club, the Sette of Odd Volumes, and became president thereof in 1890. He was painted by Philip Alexius de László in 1908; the portrait was published in The Studio in 1911.

He died on 14 March 1923 in Upton Grey, in Hampshire.

== The Studio ==
Following his retirement from trade in 1892, Holme started The Studio: an illustrated magazine of fine and applied art, a magazine dedicated to fine arts and decorative arts, giving roughly equal weight to each. The first issue appeared in April 1893. The first serving editor was Joseph Gleeson White (Lewis Hind had acted as editor for four months before the launch of the magazine). In 1895 Holme took over as editor himself, although Gleeson White continued to contribute. Holme retired as editor in 1919 for reasons of health, and was succeeded by his son Charles Geoffrey Holme, who was already the editor of special numbers and year-books of the magazine.

== Edited works ==
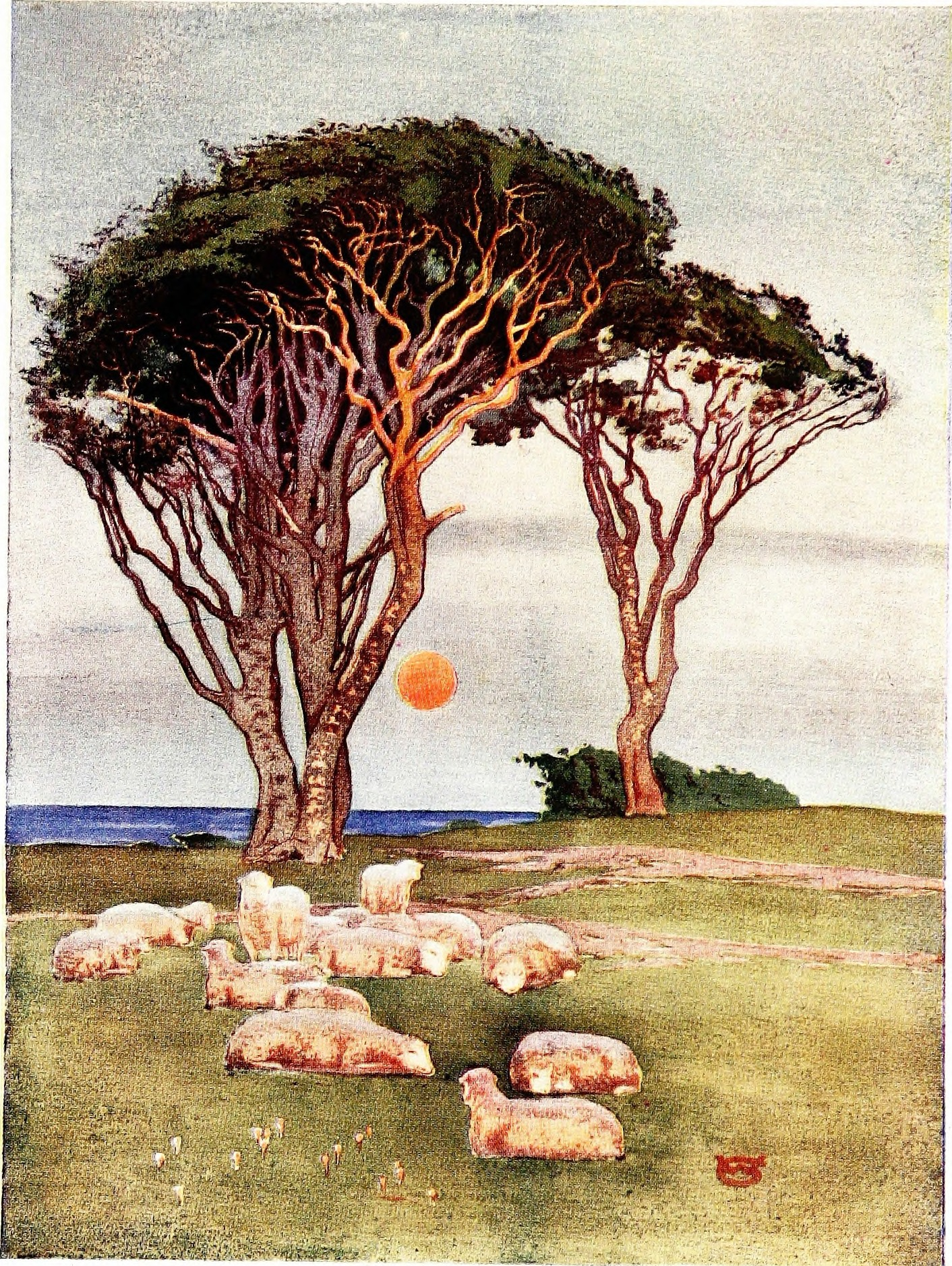
Colored etching by William Giles, in: Modern etchings, mezzotints and dry-points, 1913

Special numbers of The Studio were edited by Holme for separate publication as books.

- Corot and Millet; with critical essays by Gustave Geffroy & Arsène Alexandre, 1902
- Daumier and Gavarni by Henri Frantz and Octave Uzanne, 1904
- Peasant art in Italy by S. J. A. Churchill, V. Balzano and Elisa Ricci, 1905
- The gardens of England in the southern & western counties, 1907
- Art in England during the Elizabethan and Stuart periods by Aymer Vallance, 1908
- Old English mezzotints by Malcolm Salaman, 1910
- Peasant art in Sweden, Lapland and Iceland by Sten Granlund and Jarno Jessen (pseud.), 1910
- Peasant art in Austria and Hungary by A. S. Levetus, Dr. Haberlandt and Aladár Körösfői-Kriesch, 1911
- Peasant art in Russia, 1912
- Old houses in Holland by Sydney R. Jones, 1913
- The great painter-etchers from Rembrandt to Whistler by Malcolm Salaman, 1914
- The art of the book; a review of some recent European and American work in typography, page decoration & binding, 1914
- Shakespeare in pictorial art by Malcolm Salaman, 1916
- The development of British landscape painting in water-colours by Alexander Joseph Finberg and E. A. Taylor, 1918.
