= Dunglass Castle =

14th-century ruinous castle in Scotland

- West Dunbartonshire
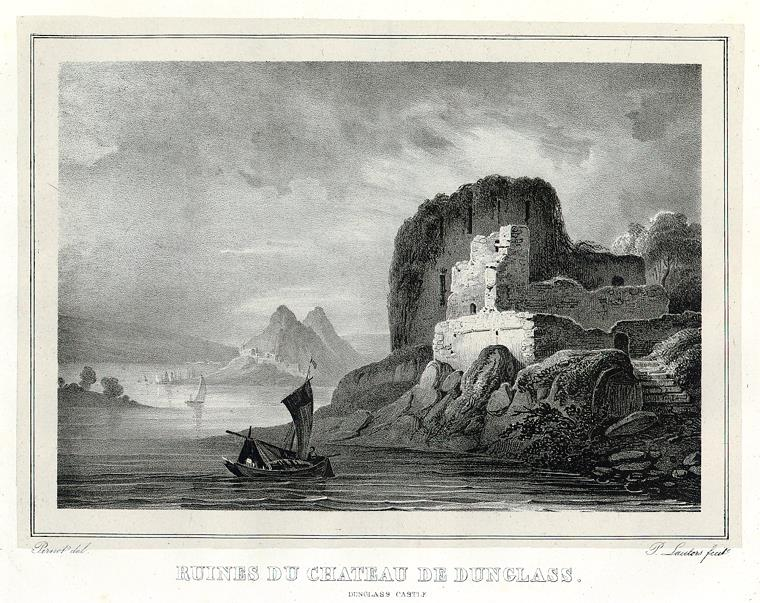

Site information
- Condition: Ruin

Location
- Coordinates: 55.9291°N 4.5027°W

Site history
- Built: 1380

Location of Dunglass Castle

Dunglass Castle, situated in West Dunbartonshire on a rocky cliff overlooking the River Clyde, is a 14th-century ruinous castle. It was designated as a Category B listed building in 1971. It has been graded at high risk by the Buildings at Risk Register for Scotland. On its grounds stands the obelisk memorial to Henry Bell, an early steamship pioneer.

== History ==
When built in 1380, Dunglass Castle served as the caput for the Barony of Colquohoun, Laird of Luss. The castle was attacked by Lord Fleming's soldiers from Dumbarton Castle in November 1568, and in February 1569 when were repulsed and Lord Fleming's half-brother was captured.

It was ruinous by the 18th century and much of the castle and courtyard stone was taken in 1735 to use in repair of the quay following an order by the Commissioners of Supply. Andrew Buchanan of Auchentorlie ended that practice when he purchased the castle in 1812.

It was leased by the graphic artist Talwin Morris in July 1893 who remodelled the interior, a remnant of the Morris interior is held in the West Dunbartonshire Council collection. The house was subsequently leased in July 1899 to Charles Macdonald, brother of Margaret and Frances Macdonald. Morris's interiors were remodelled by Mackintosh and Macdonald who created new interiors and furniture, including a white room which was later refined in Mackintosh’s masterpiece, Hill House, the home he designed for publisher, Walter Blackie at Helensburgh. A bookcase they created is now in the collection of the National Museum of Scotland and all of Mackintosh's work has been removed.

== Description ==
A large section of boundary wall remains, approximately 7–8 metres (23 ft 0 in – 26 ft 3 in) high, with a mixture of original and newer construction. A small conical dovecot also exists on the south wall but it is now completely ruined. Near the west end of the wall, and outside the south wall is a small landing place appearing to have been protected by a hoarding – some corbels for which still remains. At the north-west corner of the enclosure is a dwelling house, partly old, possibly dating back to 1590, but mostly more recent. The round tower is probably from the 17th century and appears to have been a pigeon house.

== See also ==
- Dunglass, East Lothian
