= C. A. Nicholson =

C. A. Nicholson may refer to:

- Celia Levetus (1874-1936), Canadian-English writer using pen-name C.A. Nicholson
- Sir Charles Nicholson, 2nd Baronet (1867–1949), English architect
