= Ethel Larcombe =

Ethel Larcombe may refer to:

- Ethel Thomson Larcombe (1879–1965) British tennis player
- Ethel Larcombe (artist) (1876–1940) British children's book illustrator and designer
