= Celia Levetus =

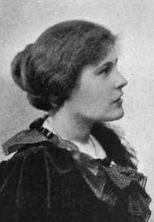
- Celia Levetus in 1900
- Born: Celia Levetus; 1874; Montreal
- Died: 1936 (aged 61–62)
- Education: Birmingham School of Art
- Known for: Illustrations
- Movement: Birmingham School

Celia Levetus also known as C. A. Nicholson and Diana Forbes (1874-1936) was a Canadian-English author, poet and illustrator of the Birmingham School.

== Biography ==
Celia Levetus was born in 1874 to English parents living in Montreal. Her father worked in the silverware business and was also a professional singer. Her aunt, Amelia S. Levetus, was an art critic who wrote for The Studio. In 1878 the Levetus family moved back to England, first living in London and then in Edgbaston. Levetus attended the Birmingham School of Art, where she was taught by Walter Crane.

Influenced by Crane as well as William Morris, Levetus became associated with the Birmingham school of illustrators. She illustrated books, designed bookplates and greeting cards, and contributed to periodicals such as the English Illustrated Magazine and The Yellow Book. She exhibited her work at venues such as the Walker Art Gallery, the Manchester Art Gallery, and the annual exhibition of the Ex Libris Society.

Her most notable work is a series of illustrations for a collection of Turkish fairy tales collected by Ignác Kúnos and translated by Robert Nisbet Bain. In 1895, she contributed to A Book of Nursery Rhymes along with other Birmingham School illustrators. She also illustrated Verse Fancies, a volume of poems published by her brother, Edward Lewis Levetus, in 1897; a miniature edition of William Blake's Songs of Innocence (Wells Gardner & Company, 1899); and a full-sized edition of his Songs of Experience (1902).

After marrying Eric Pearson Nicholson in 1902, she stopped illustrating professionally. She wrote several novels and a volume of poetry (The Comfort-Lady and Other Poems, 1911) under the pen names C. A. Nicholson and Diana Forbes. She died in 1936.

== Gallery ==
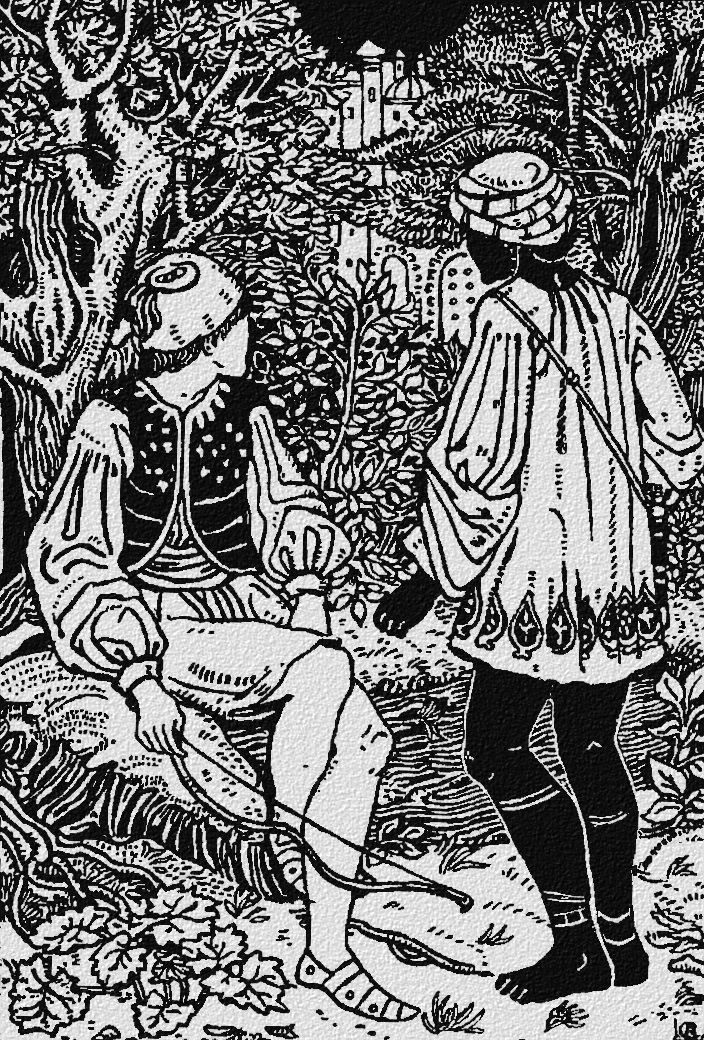
"Aleodor and the Emperor," Turkish Fairy Tales, 1896

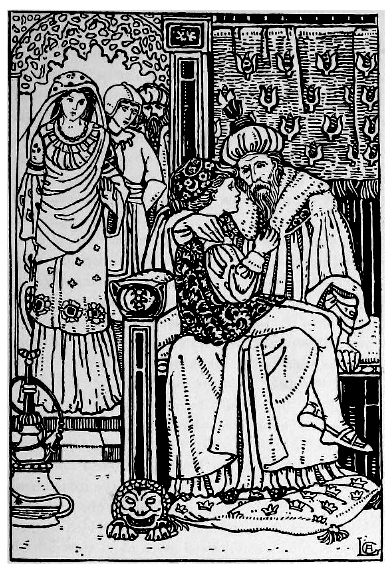
"Boy-Beautiful and His Faithful Servant," Turkish Fairy Tales, 1896

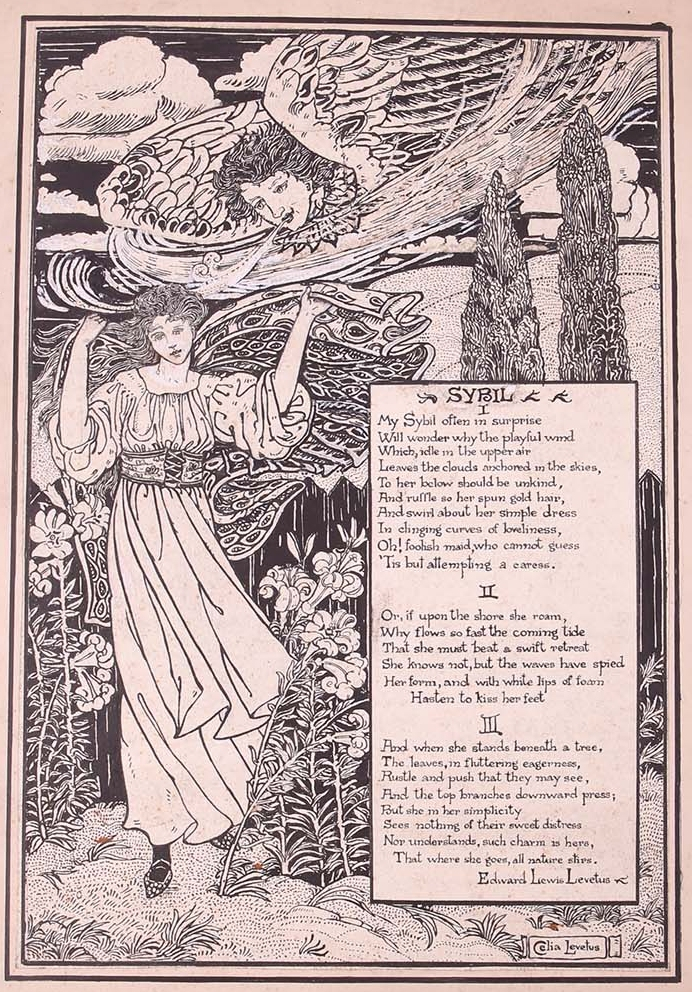
"Sybil," Verse Fancies, 1897
