= Pall Mall Budget =

British weekly newspaper (1868-1920)

- Categories: News magazine
- Frequency: Weekly
- Publisher: J. Kellett; William Waldorf Astor
- Founded: 1868
- Final issue: 1920
- Country: United Kingdom
- Based in: London
- OCLC: 10741463

The Pall Mall Budget was a weekly magazine published in London from 1868 until 1920. It was a weekly digest of articles from evening newspaper The Pall Mall Gazette (1865 to 1923). The Pall Mall Budget was re-launched in 1893 by William Waldorf Astor. C. Lewis Hind was its editor from 1893 to 1895.

The full title in 1869, as displayed on the title page of Volume 2 as bound, was The PALL MALL BUDGET Being a Weekly Collection of Articles Printed in the PALL MALL GAZETTE from day to day: With a Summary of News.
