= Ethel Larcombe (artist) =

Laura Ethel Larcombe
- Born: 1876; Exeter, England
- Died: 12 December 1940 (aged 63–64); Exeter, England
- Known for: Illustration, Typography
- Movement: Arts and Crafts movement, Art Nouveau

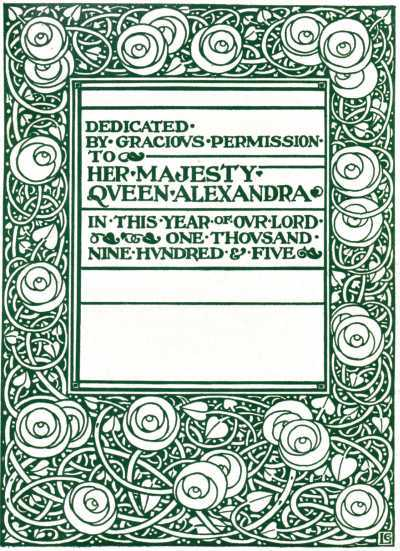
Ethel Larcombe - dedication page, Walter Shaw Sparrow's Women Painters of the World (1905)

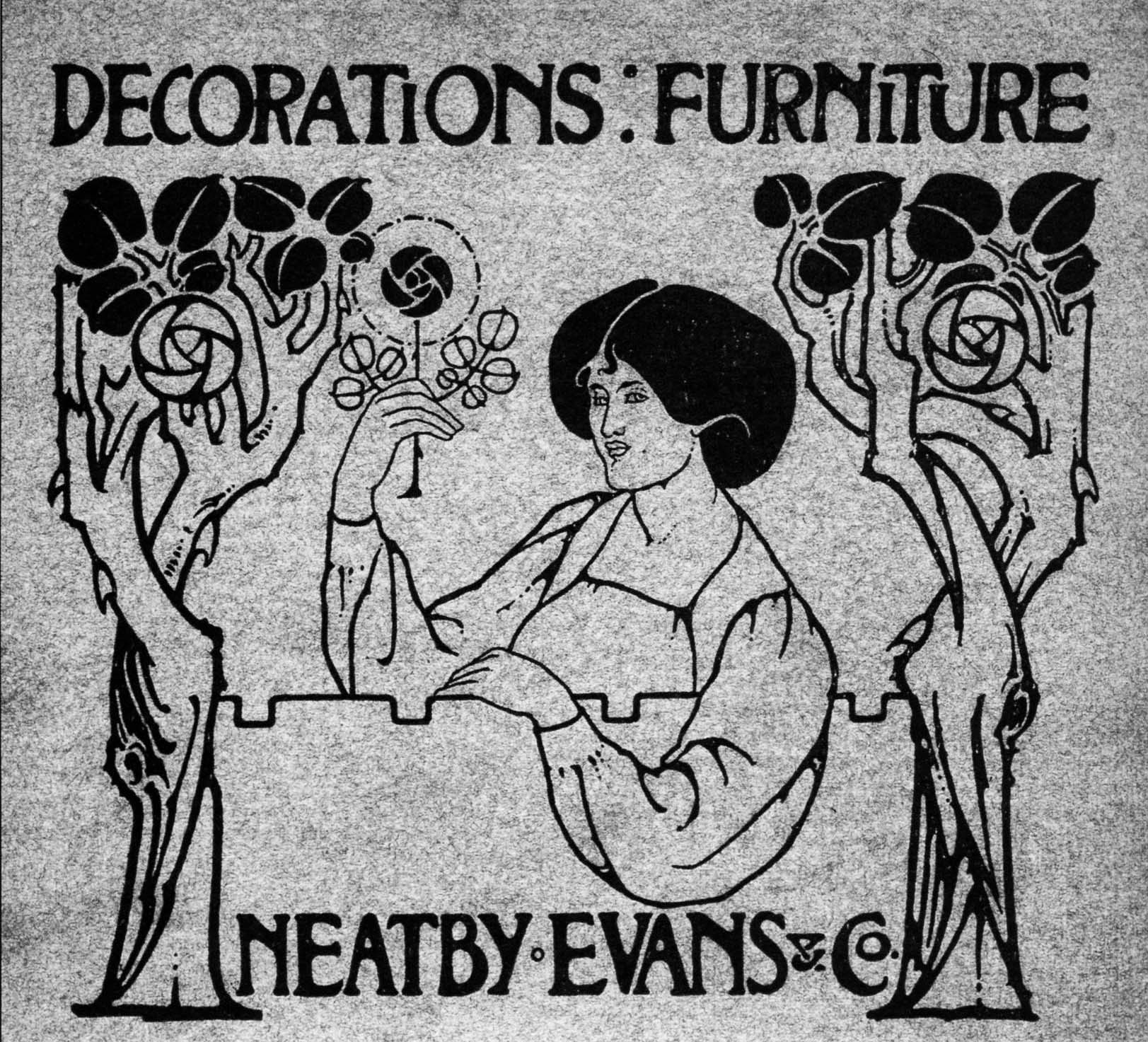
Ethel Larcombe - Advertisement - 1901

Laura Ethel Larcombe (1876–1940) was an early twentieth-century British children's book illustrator and designer.

== Biography ==
Born and raised in Exeter, Larcombe was the daughter of John Samuel Larcombe and his wife Louisa who owned a small school in the town. She first garnered attention for her 1899 work Summer for a competition held by The Studio magazine, and her typographic lettering was subsequently shown at the Prima Esposizione Internazionale d'Arte Decorativa Moderna in 1902 in Turin. She was employed on a freelance basis by Talwin Morris, Art Director at the Glasgow-based publishers Blackie & Son to design bookbindings for the firm and their London subsidiary, Gresham. Many of these designs were produced in several colourways.

Larcombe's work can be seen in contemporary publications by The Studio Magazine, Stone, Von Larisch, Walter Shaw Sparrow and Salwey. In the spring of 1917, American retailer Sears marketed green-bordered cotton cloth "coverettes" bearing Larcombe illustrations to customers looking to decorate nurseries and children's rooms. Prior to that she had illustrated a number of "rag books" for Dean & Son. Her designs were also used for chromolithographed postcards printed by E. W. Savory Co. of Bristol and she provided an advert for Arts & Crafts furniture designers Neatby & Evans.

Larcombe died in Exeter on 12 December 1940.
