= Hill House, Helensburgh =

Home in Helensburgh, Scotland designed by Charles Rennie Mackintosh

Coordinates: 56°01′01.4″N 04°43′41″W

Hill House
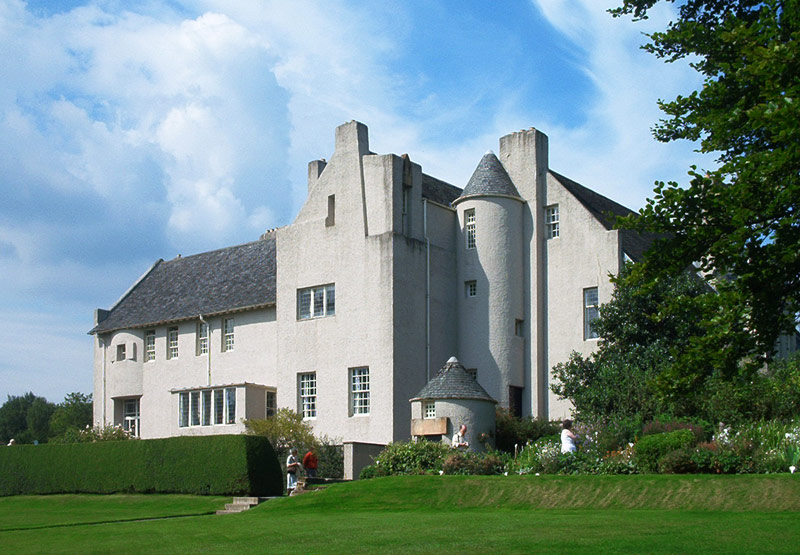
- Established: 1902
- Location: Helensburgh, Scotland, United Kingdom
- Architect: Charles Rennie Mackintosh
- Owner: Walter Blackie
- Website: https://www.nts.org.uk/visit/places/the-hill-house

The Hill House is a villa in Helensburgh, Scotland, designed between 1902 and 1904 by Charles Rennie Mackintosh. Commissioned by publisher Walter Blackie, the house was conceived in an innovative manner and is noted for its forward looking design and construction techniques. The building is characterised by an austere, unornamented exterior finished in grey roughcast and drawing references from Scottish vernacular and baronial architecture. Margaret Macdonald Mackintosh also played a key role in the project designing and making interior elements. Her total contribution, as with many Mackintosh projects, remains the subject of ongoing debate, but, it is accepted that the major architectural composition is by Mackintosh. In 1982, the property was donated to the National Trust for Scotland, which continues to maintain and open it to the public.

== Construction ==
Helensburgh, to the west of Glasgow, was settled by businessmen whose wealth came from the industrialised city. In 1902, Walter Blackie, of the publishers Blackie and Son, purchased a plot on which to build a new home. At the suggestion of Talwin Morris, Charles Rennie Mackintosh was appointed to design and build Hill House.

Blackie had specific requirements for the construction, seeking grey rough-cast walls and a slate roof instead of traditional materials like bricks and wood beams with red-tiled roofs commonly used in the west of Scotland. He also emphasized architectural effects through the massing of the parts rather than ornamentation. The requirements and non-traditional taste of the client allowed Mackintosh full rein for his design ideas.

Mackintosh collaborated closely with the Blackie family throughout the design and construction of Hill House, tailoring the layout to suit their routines and preferences. Blackie later recalled, "Not until we had decided on these inside arrangements did he submit drawings of the elevations."

The Hill House is reputed to be haunted by the ghost of Blackie. Reports include sightings of a tall figure in a black cape and the unexplained smell of cigar or pipe smoke.

== Exterior ==
The Hill House was designed by Charles Rennie Mackintosh and built at a cost of £5,000. Its exterior exhibits an asymmetrical design. Mackintosh was influenced by A. W. N. Pugin's picturesque utility, where the exterior contour evolves from the interior planning. Mackintosh's approach, influenced by Pugin, featured minimal exterior decoration in contrast to his more detailed interior work. He achieved this by making the transition from the outside world into a more inviting interior space. Paint analysis of the harling on the exterior shows that it might have initially been left as an unpainted pale grey.

=== Preservation (2019–2028) ===
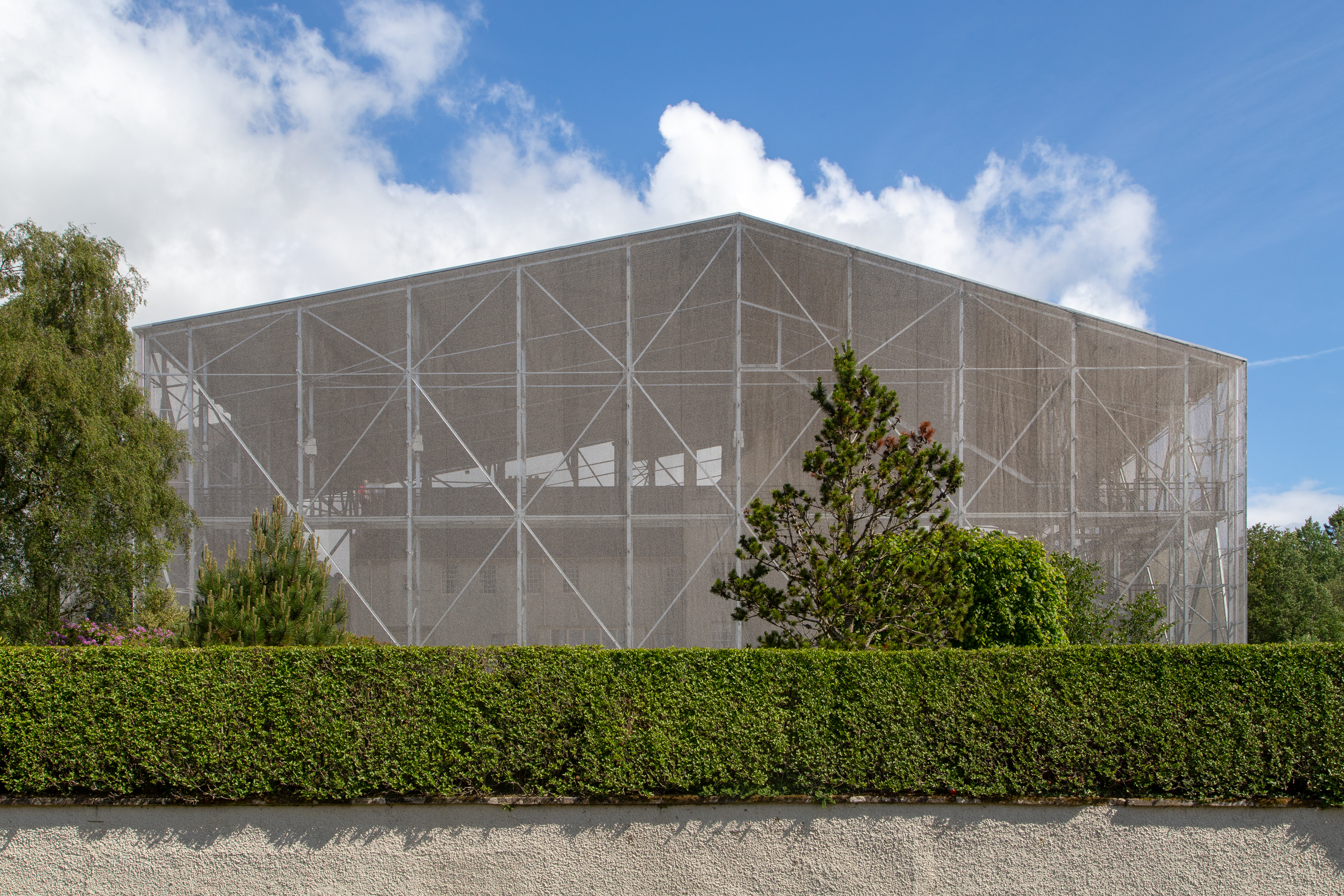
The porous "box" surrounding the house (June 2019)

As with several of Mackintosh's buildings, there were problems of water ingress from the outset. In 1953, then-owner Campbell Lawson commissioned Glasgow architect Margaret Brodie to seek advice regarding repairs and prevention techniques for water penetration. Margaret Brodie noted several issues with the large chimney stack at the west of the house being the most likely cause of water ingress. This was also recognised in 2019 when an infra-red thermographic imaging survey was carried out to reveal areas where damp had occurred.

In 2019, the National Trust for Scotland enclosed Hill House in a transparent, chainmail-clad structure known as "the Box" to protect it from further water damage. The house's original Portland cement harling, an innovative but ultimately flawed material choice, had proven less durable than traditional lime harling, leading to significant moisture ingress. By 2017, the building's condition had deteriorated to the point of threatening its structural integrity. The protective enclosure allows air to circulate while shielding the house from rain, enabling the structure to dry out gradually. The Box is expected to remain in place until 2028, during which time conservation efforts will continue to address both exterior and interior damage caused by decades of damp conditions.

== Interior ==
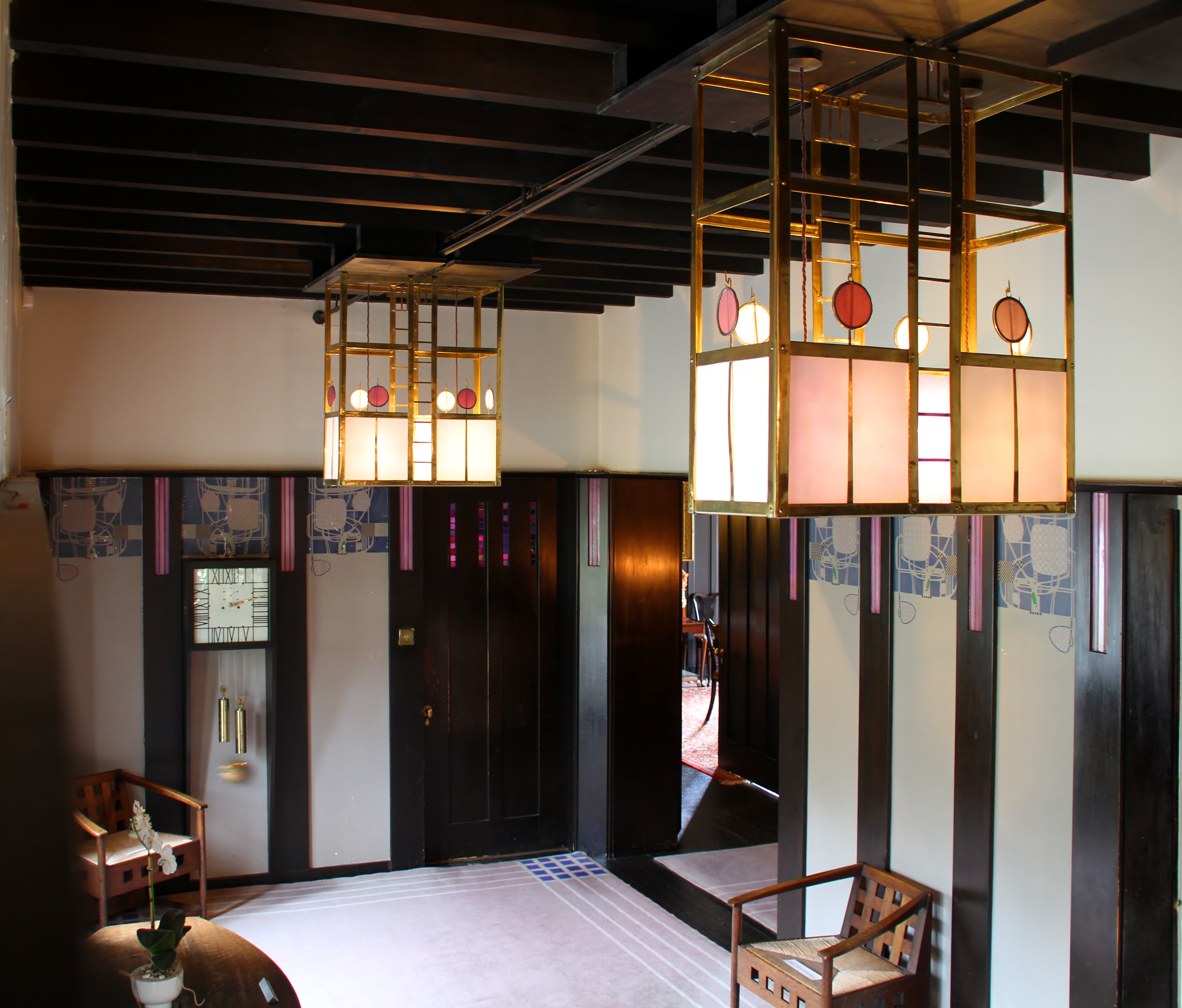
One room of the interior of the house

The interior was designed before the exterior and the massing of external forms derives from the interior programme. There is a defined separation of business and domestic life with Blackie's library and study and its attendant cloakroom immediately adjacent to the front entrance.

Light levels in the lower hall are modulated through dark wood panelling and screens with inset coloured glass and through the use of strikingly architectural stained glass luminaires. The arrival sequence allows for a series of revelations on passing from the entrance into the domestic spaces. The white painted drawing room with its rose-stencilled wall decorations has three distinct zones centred around the fireplace with its gesso panel artwork by Margaret Macdonald Mackintosh, a bay window and music alcove.

The dark, wood-panelled dining room features a polished steel fireplace centred between two south facing windows. The remainder of the ground floor is given over to service and utility spaces such as the kitchen and pantry. Throughout the house are original fitted and moveable furniture pieces all designed by Mackintosh with several original or replica textile pieces by Margaret Macdonald Mackintosh.

The upper floor features in its east wing rooms designated for the Blackie children. The main wing has bathrooms and guest rooms along with the principal bedroom again white painted and stencilled and containing a white and pink-detailed bedroom suite. This room is zoned with a vaulted ceiling above the bed and a sitting area along with separate dressing room adjacent.

Some interpretations suggest that Hill House reflects Edwardian associations of interior space with "femininity" and exterior forms with "masculinity". Mackintosh's design approach introduced elements typically associated with the latter into the domestic interior, departing from the ornate, conventionally "feminine" style of the period. This method enabled variations in the atmosphere and experience of different spaces according to their intended functions.

== See also ==
- Glasgow School of Art
- Willow Tearooms
