= Margaret Macdonald Mackintosh =

British artist (1864–1933)

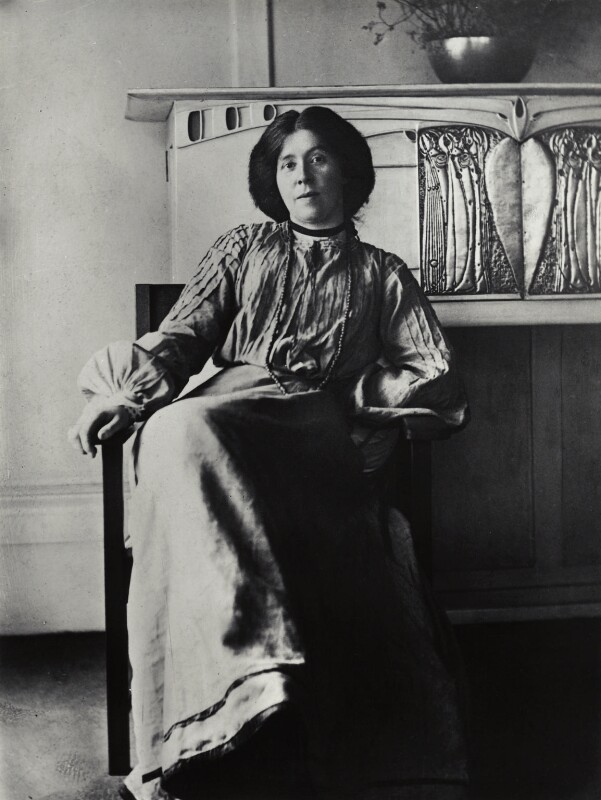
- Born: Margaret Macdonald; 5 November 1864; Tipton, Staffordshire, England, United Kingdom
- Died: 7 January 1933 (aged 68); Chelsea, London, United Kingdom
- Education: Glasgow School of Art
- Known for: Decorative Arts, Design, Art
- Movement: Art Nouveau, Glasgow Style, Symbolism
- Spouse: Charles Rennie Mackintosh
- Relatives: Frances MacDonald (sister)

Margaret Macdonald Mackintosh (5 November 1864 – 7 January 1933) was a British artist who worked in Scotland, and whose design work became one of the defining features of the Glasgow Style during the 1890s to 1900s.

== Biography ==
Born Margaret Macdonald, at Tipton, Staffordshire between Birmingham and Wolverhampton, her father was a colliery manager and engineer. Margaret and her younger sister Frances both attended the Orme Girls' School, Newcastle-under-Lyme, Staffordshire; their names are recorded in the school register. In the 1881 census Margaret, aged 16, was a visitor at someone else's house on census night and was listed as a scholar. By 1890, the family had settled in Glasgow and Margaret and her sister, Frances Macdonald, enrolled as day students at the Glasgow School of Art studying courses in design. There, she worked with a variety of media, including metalwork, embroidery, and textiles. Additionally, she joined other groups, such as the Scottish Society of Watercolour Painters in 1898.

She began collaborating with her sister Frances, and in 1896 the pair worked from their studio at 128 Hope Street, Glasgow, where they produced book illustrations, embroidery, gesso panels, leaded glass and repoussé metalwork. Their innovative work was inspired by Celtic imagery, literature, symbolism, and folklore. Margaret later collaborated with her husband, the architect and designer Charles Rennie Mackintosh, whom she married on 22 August 1900. Her most well-known works are the gesso panels made for interiors designed with Charles, such as tearooms and private residences.

Charles Rennie Mackintosh is frequently claimed to be Scotland's most famous architect. Margaret Macdonald Mackintosh was somewhat marginalised in comparison. Yet she was celebrated in her time by many of her peers, including her husband who once wrote in a letter to her, "Remember, you are half if not three-quarters in all my architectural work ..."; and reportedly "Margaret has genius, I have only talent."

Active and recognised during her career, between 1895 and 1924 she contributed to more than 40 European and American exhibitions. Poor health cut short Margaret's career and, as far as is known, she produced no work after 1921. She died in 1933.

== The Glasgow Four ==
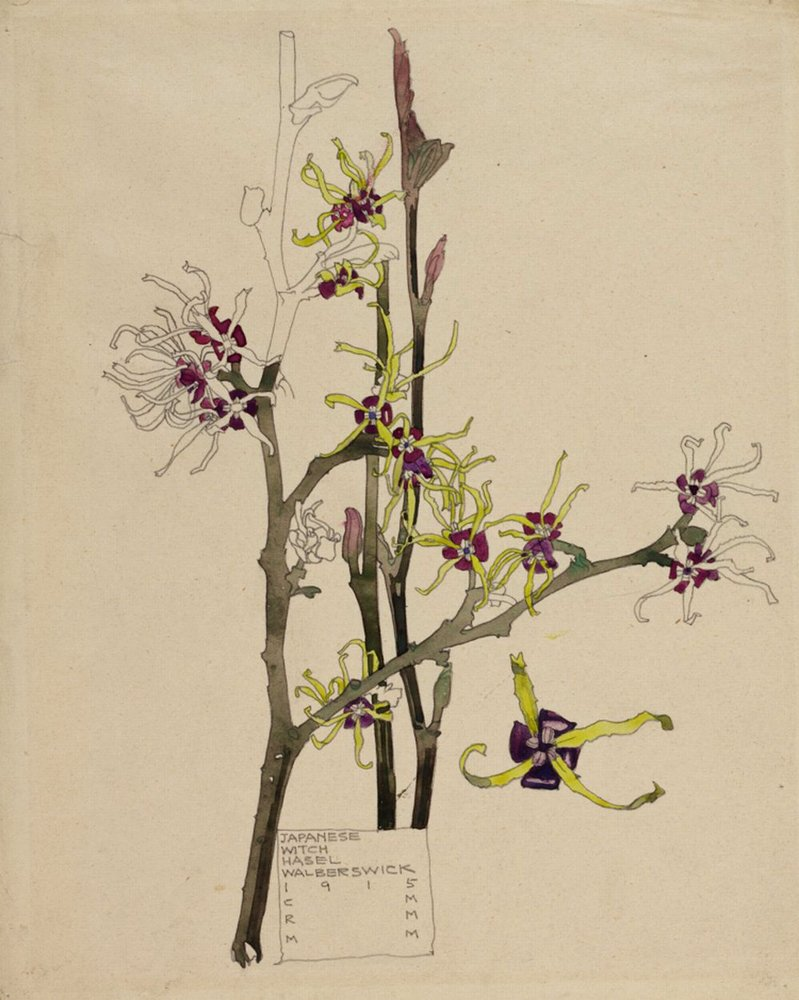
Japanese Witch Hazel, Walberswick, 1915 is one of a number of botanical illustrations carrying Margaret's initials alongside those of her husband Charles Rennie Mackintosh

It is unclear exactly when the Macdonald sisters met Charles Rennie Mackintosh and his friend/colleague Herbert MacNair, but they probably met around 1892 at the Glasgow School of Art (Mackintosh and MacNair were studying as night students), introduced by the Headmaster Francis Newbery because he recognised that they were working in similar styles. By 1894, they were showing their work together in student exhibitions, some of which was made collaboratively. Reception of the work was mixed, and it was commented that the gaunt, linear forms of the Macdonald sisters' artwork – clearly showing the influence of Aubrey Beardsley – were 'ghoulish' and earned them the moniker 'The Spook School'. They became known locally as "The Four".

Most collaborative work in the 1890s was with her sister, particularly following the opening of their studio in 1896. Some works were made by both together, while others were series of works, such as a set of four paintings with repoussé frames on the seasons where each two works on the theme. They also created a set of illustrations for William Morris' Defence of Guenevere that was recently re-discovered in a special collections of the University at Buffalo.

She created several important interior schemes with her husband, including work at the home of her brother Charles at Dunglass. Many of these were executed at the early part of the 20th century; and include the Rose Boudoir at the International Exhibition at Turin in 1903, the designs for House for an Art Lover in 1900, and the Willow Tearooms in 1902. She exhibited with Mackintosh at the 1900 Vienna Secession, where she was an influence on the Secessionists Gustav Klimt and Josef Hoffmann. They continued to be popular in the Viennese art scene, both exhibiting at the Viennese International Art Exhibit in 1909.

In 1902, the couple received a major Viennese commission: Fritz Waerndorfer, the initial financer of the Wiener Werkstätte, was building a new villa outside Vienna showcasing the work of many local architects. Hoffmann and Koloman Moser were already designing two of its rooms; he invited the Mackintoshes to design the music room. That room was decorated with panels of Margaret's art: the Opera of the Winds, the Opera of the Seas, and the Seven Princesses, a new wall-sized triptych considered by some to be her finest work. This collaboration was described by contemporary critic Amelia Levetus as "perhaps their greatest work, for they were allowed perfectly free scope".

== Inspiration and style ==
Mackintosh did not keep sketchbooks, which reflects her reliance on imagination rather than on nature. A few sources provided significant inspiration for her works, including the Bible, the Odyssey, poems by Morris and Rossetti, and the works of Maurice Maeterlinck. Her works, along with those works of her often collaborating sister, defied her contemporaries' conceptions of art. Gleeson White wrote, "With a delightfully innocent air these two sisters disclaim any attempt to acknowledge that Egyptian decoration has interested them specially. 'We have no basis.' Nor do they advance any theory."

The beginning of her artistic career reflects broad strokes of experimentation. Largely drawing from her imagination, she reinterpreted traditional themes, allegories, and symbols in inventive ways. For instance, immediately following the 1896 opening of her Glasgow studio with her sister, she transformed broad ideas such as "Time" and "Summer" into highly stylized human forms. Many of her works incorporate muted natural tones, elongated nude human forms, and a subtle interplay between geometric and natural motifs. Above all, her designs demonstrated a type of originality that distinguishes her from other artists of her time.

== Popular work ==
Mackintosh and her husband Charles were part of the popular gesso revival, their gesso panels were shown at the eighth exhibition of the Vienna Secession in 1900. The Mackintosh-Macdonald interior designs exhibited in 1900 with their restricted colour palettes and fitted benches had an immediate impact on contemporary tastes, as the interior architecture was less lavish than earlier designs.

Her gesso panels are now on display in the Kelvingrove Museum in Glasgow. The 2017–18 restoration of The Willow Tearooms building has seen a recreation of "Oh ye, all ye that walk in Willowwood" installed in the original location within the Room de Luxe.

Mackintosh's Seven Princesses is considered to be her masterpiece. It consists of three wall-sized gesso panels showing a scene from Maurice Maeterlinck's play of the same name. This work was extremely popular in Vienna and its surrounding art scene. When the Waerndorfer villa was sold in 1916, the panels disappeared from public view. In 1990, the panels were rediscovered in Vienna's Museum of Applied Arts, in a hidden room in the basement. They were in separate crates and had apparently been placed there for safekeeping during WWI. The gesso panels are now on permanent display in the Museum.

In 2008 Mackintosh's 1902 work The White Rose and the Red Rose, a painted gesso over hessian with glass bead artwork, was auctioned for the equivalent to £2,653,098 in 2023.

== Gallery ==
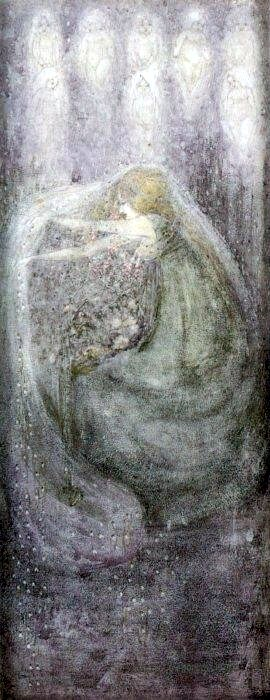
Winter, 1898.

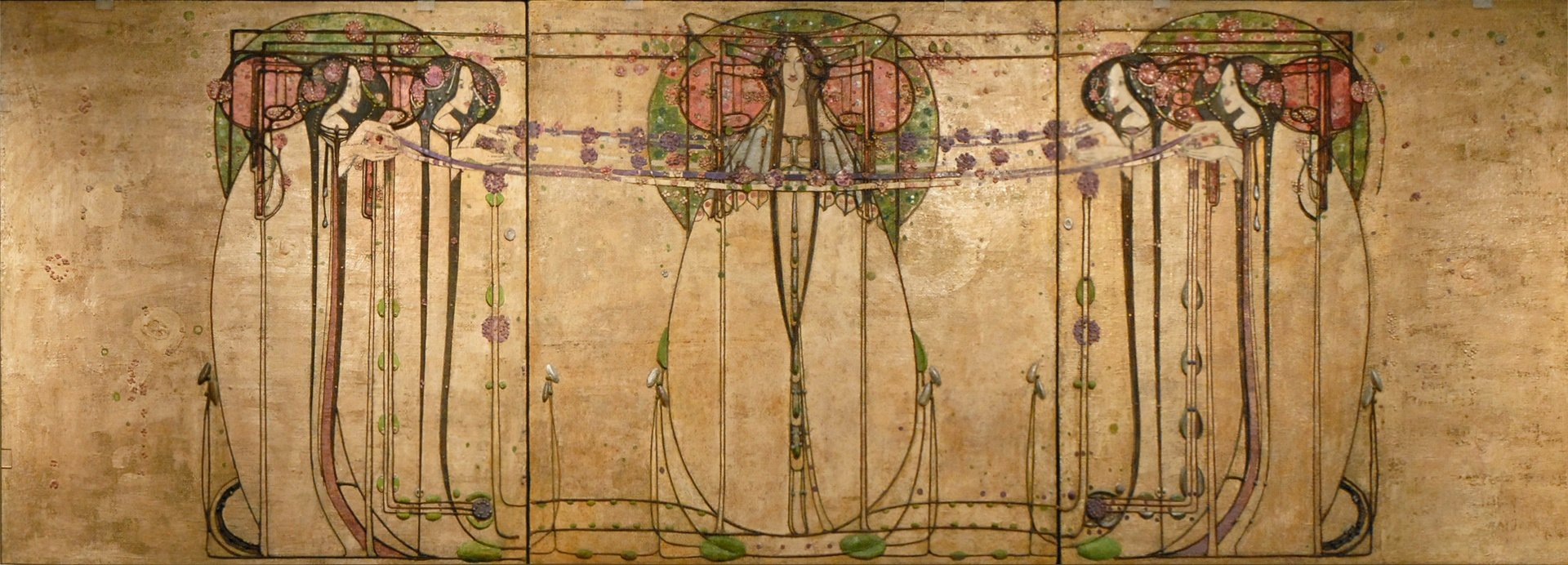
The May Queen, 1900.

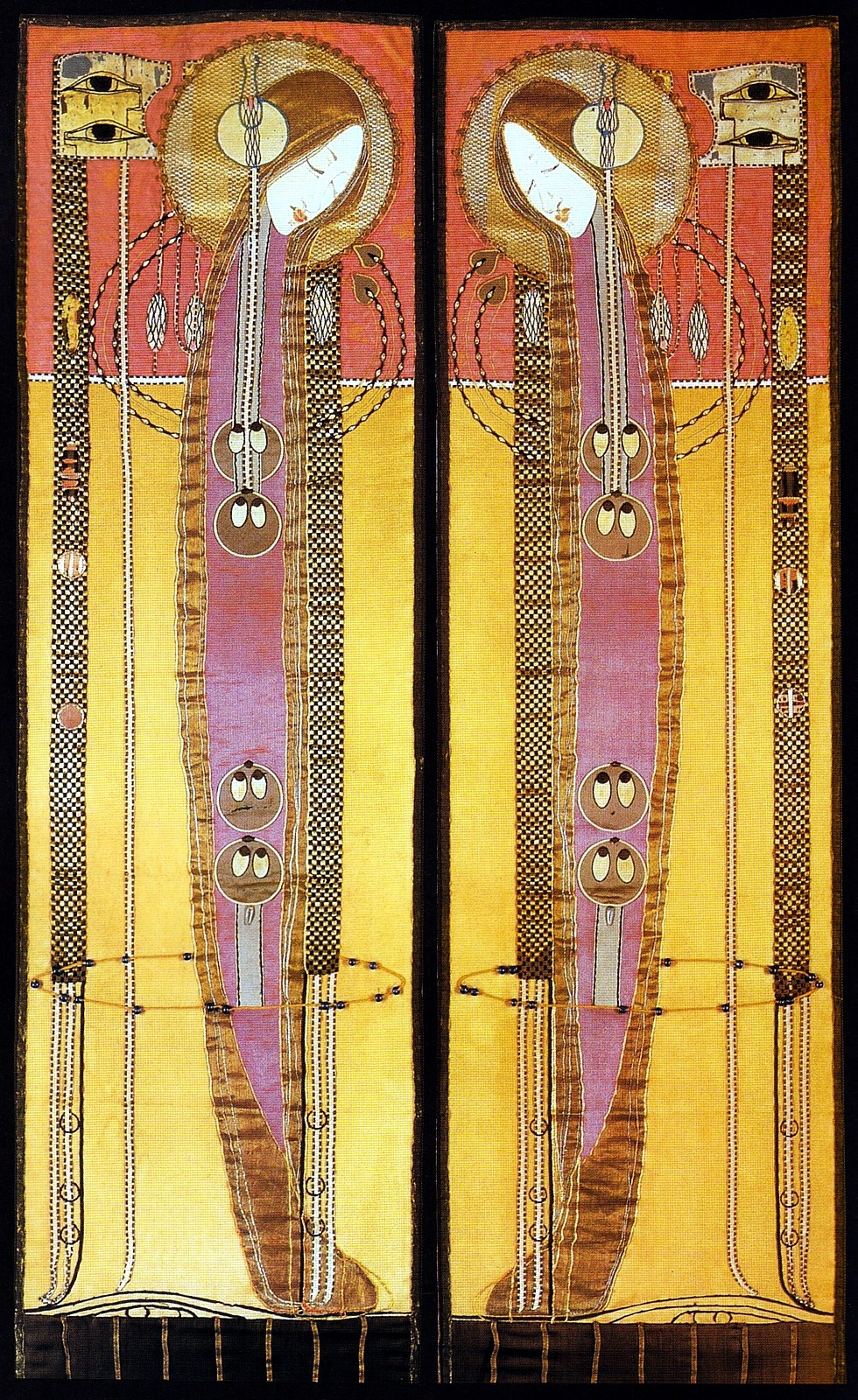
Embroidered panels, 1902.

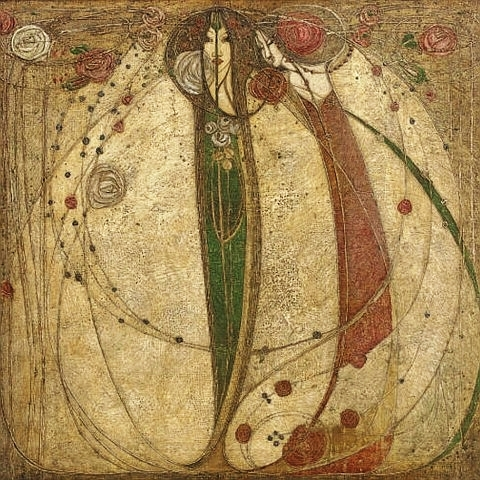
White Rose And Red Rose, 1902.

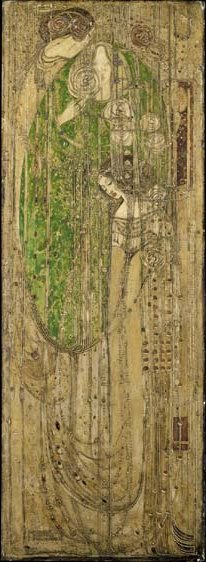
Oh ye, all ye that walk in Willowwood, 1903.

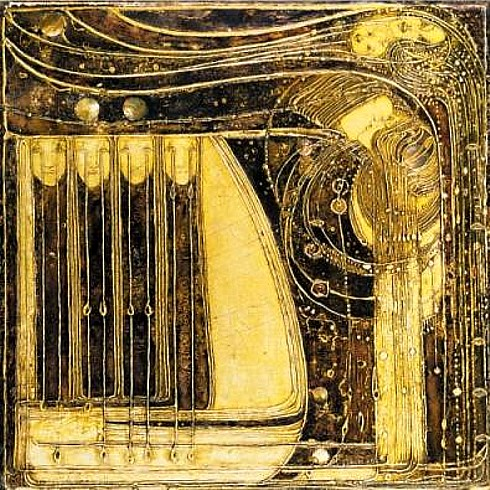
Opera of the Winds, 1903.

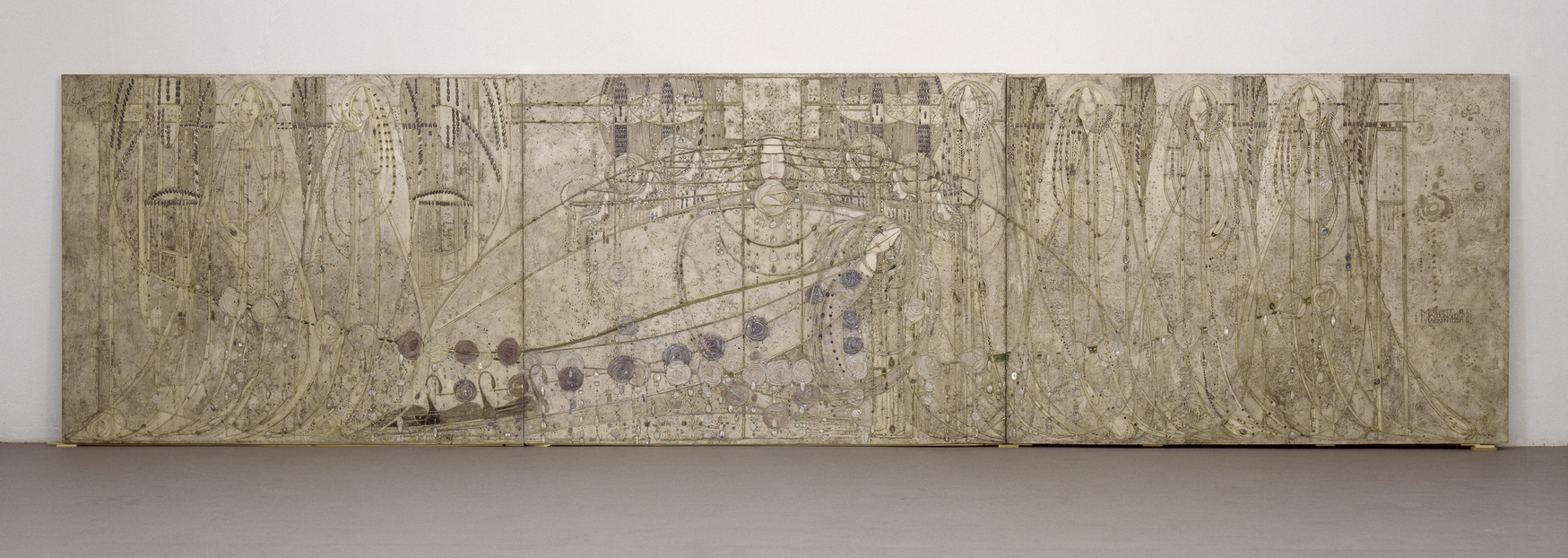
Seven Princesses, 1907

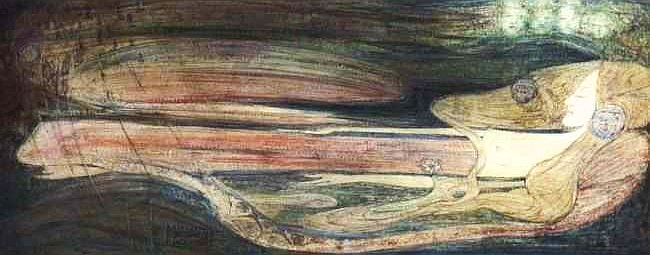
Ophelia, 1908.

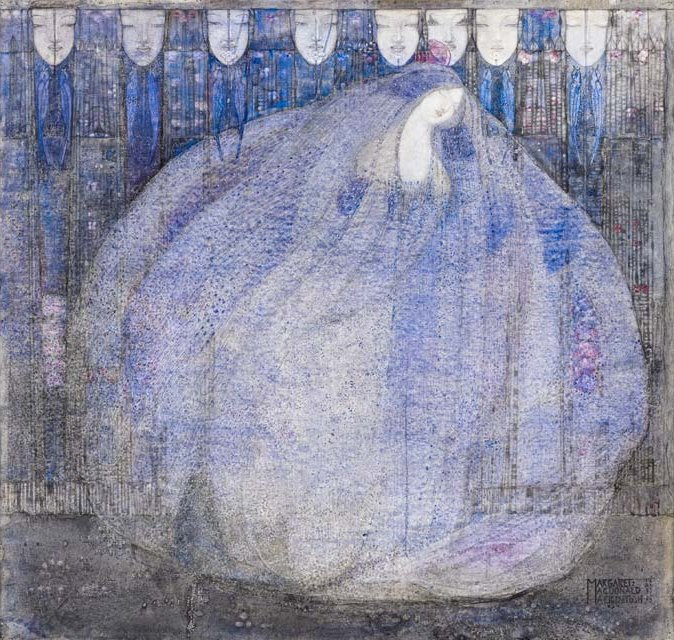
The Mysterious Garden, 1911.

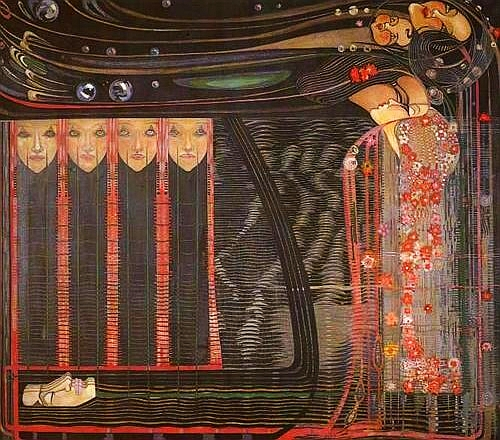
The Opera of the Seas, 1915.

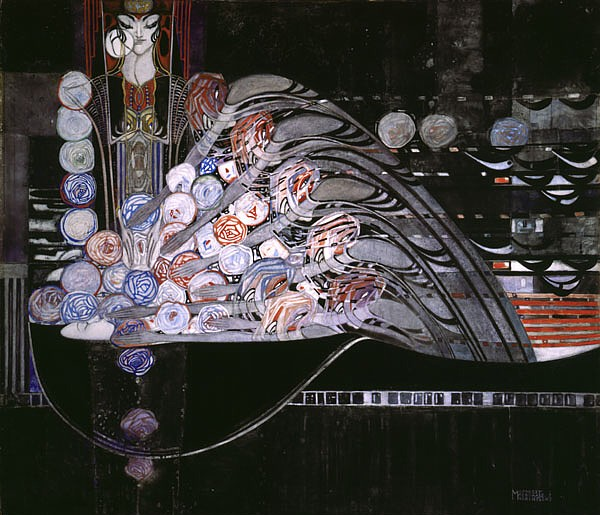
La mort parfumée, 1921.

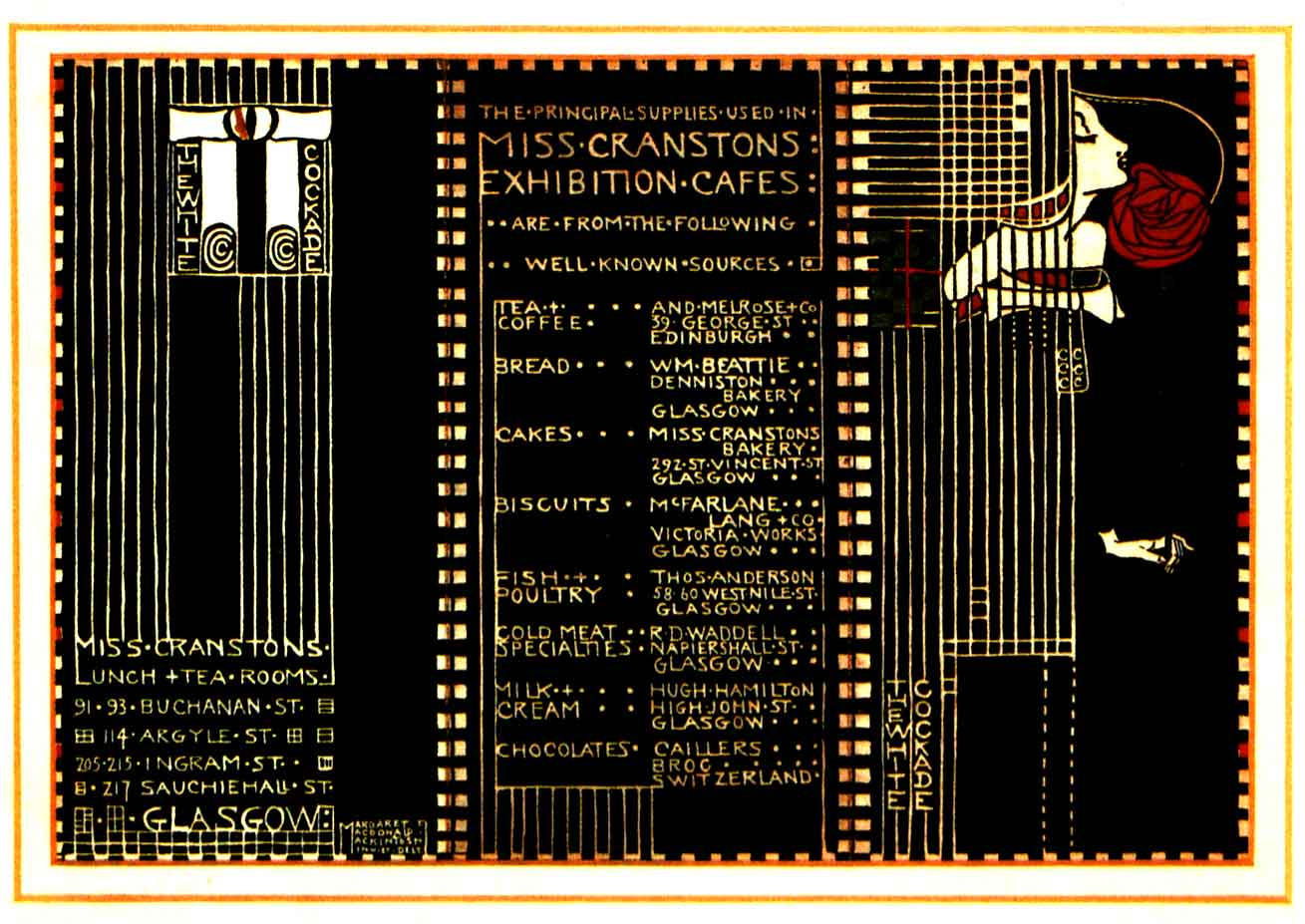
Menu card design, 1911.

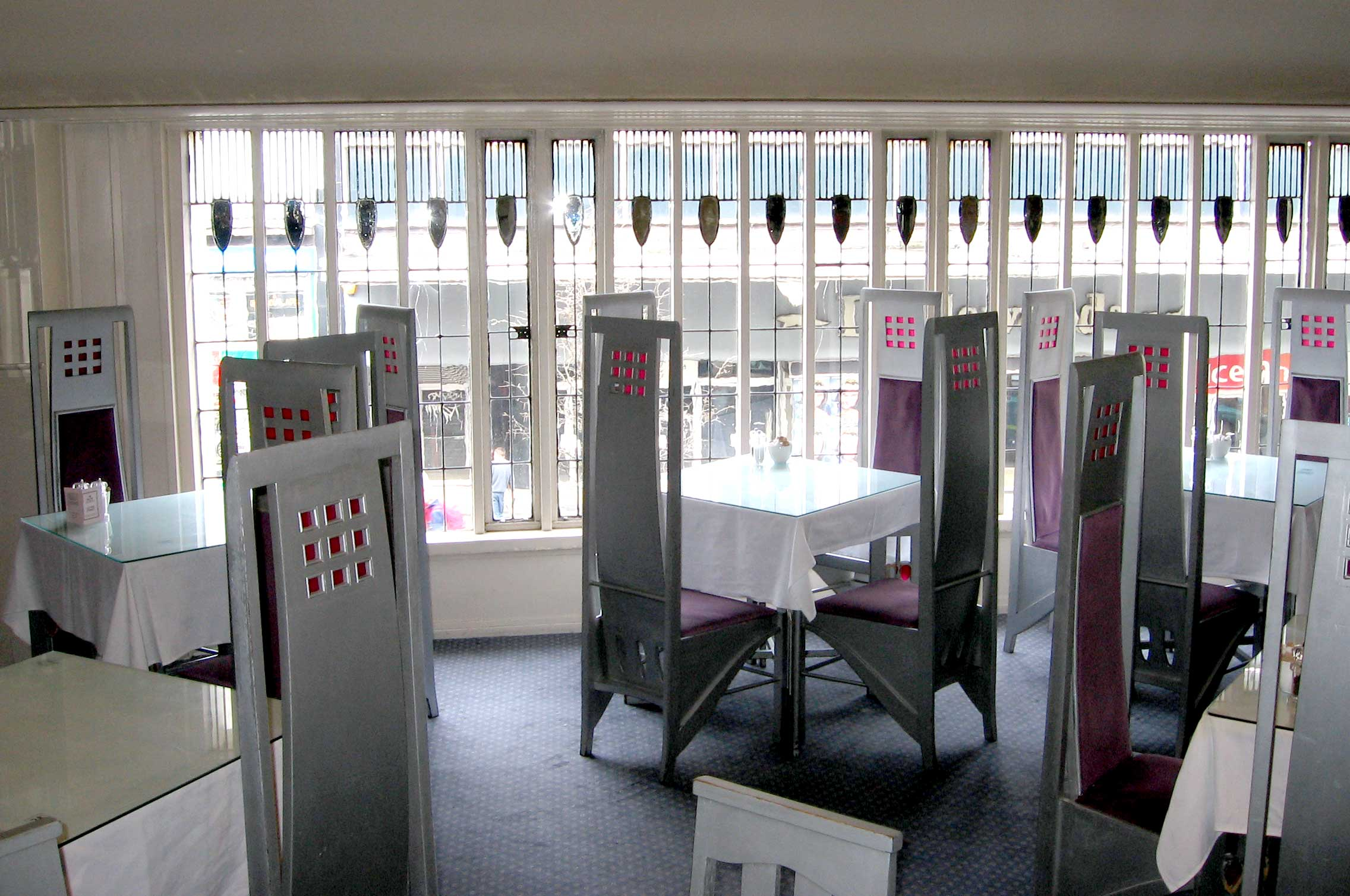
The Room de Luxe at the Willow Tearooms.
