= Joseph Gleeson White =

English writer and editor (1851–1898)

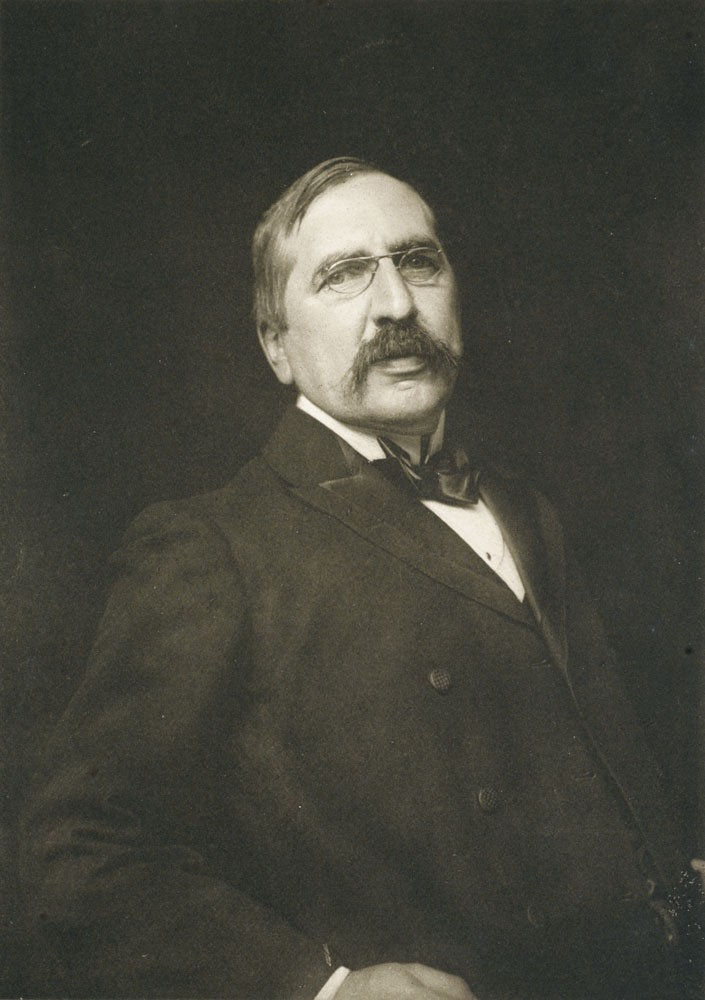
- White portrait in Die Kunst in der Photographie, 1897
- Born: 1851; Christchurch, Dorset, England
- Died: 1898 (aged 46–47)
- Other name: Gleeson White
- Known for: editor of The Studio

Joseph William Gleeson White (1851–1898), often known as Gleeson White, was an English writer on art.

== Life ==
He was born in Christchurch, Dorset and educated at Christ Church School and afterward became a member of the Art Workers Guild. While living in Christchurch, he had briefly housed Richard Le Gallienne during the summer of 1888. He moved to New York City in 1890 where he conducted the Art Amateur (1891–92). He returned to England in 1893. He was the first serving editor of The Studio, founded by Charles Holme in 1893 (Lewis Hind had acted as editor for four months before the launch of the magazine). In 1895 Holme took over as editor himself, although Gleeson White continued to contribute for the rest of his life. He also edited during his last years the "Ex Libris Series"; the "Connoisseur Series"; the "Pageant"; and, with Edward F. Strange, Bell's "Cathedral Series."

== Publications ==
The published works of Gleeson White include:

- Practical Designing (1893; third edition, 1897)
- Salisbury Cathedral (1896)
- English Illustrations in the Sixties (1897)
- Master Painters of Great Britain, 4 vols. (1897–98)
