= Cecile Walton =

Scottish artist (1891–1956)

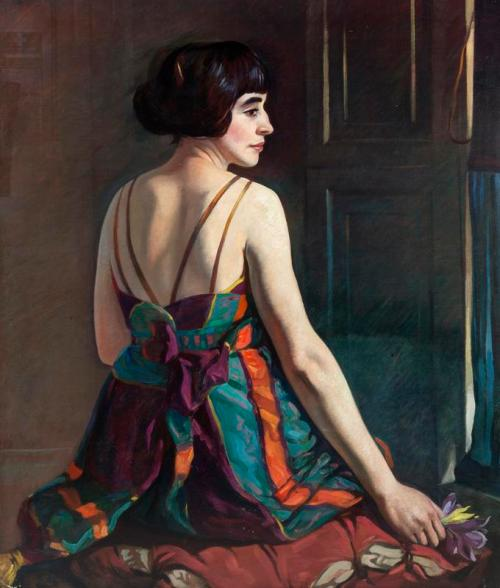
- Cecile by Eric Robertson, 1922
- Born: 29 March 1891; Glasgow, Scotland
- Died: 23 April 1956 (aged 65); Edinburgh, Scotland
- Education: Edinburgh College of Art; Académie de la Grande Chaumière
- Known for: Painting
- Awards: Guthrie Award, 1921

Cecile Walton (29 March 1891 – 23 April 1956) was a Scottish painter, illustrator and sculptor. She and her husband Eric were two of the moving spirits of the Edinburgh chapter of the Symbolist movement in the early 20th century.

== Life ==
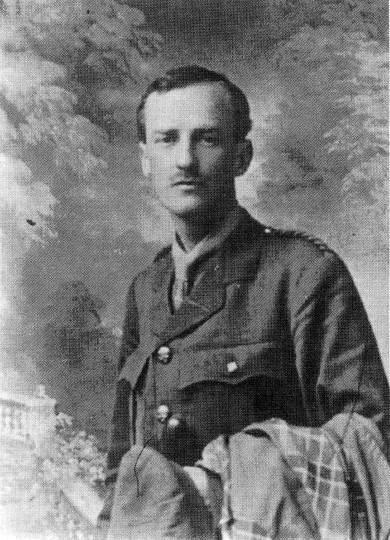
Eric Harald Macbeth Robertson

Walton was born in Glasgow, the eldest of four children and daughter of the artists Helen and Edward Arthur Walton. In 1893, when Walton was two years old, her family moved to London, where from 1902 her neighbour was James Abbott McNeill Whistler. In 1904, the Waltons moved again to Edinburgh, and Walton was taught etching by John Duncan at his home, where she also met artists and writers, including Dorothy Johnstone and, in 1907, Eric Robertson. She also attended the Edinburgh College of Art where, in place of drawing, she took Percy Portsmouth's sculpture modelling class. While still a student, Walton was elected to the Society of Scottish Artists in 1908, exhibited at the Royal Scottish Academy from 1909 and the Royal Glasgow Institute from 1910, and she showed at the Royal Academy in London from 1913. Walton also studied at the Académie de la Grande Chaumière in Paris for two winters and spent some time in Florence. In 1911, Walton was commissioned by the publishers T.C. & E.C. Jack to illustrate their edition of Hans Andersen's Fairy Tales.

Against her parents' advice, she married her fellow Edinburgh student, Eric Harald Macbeth Robertson (1887–1941) in 1914. Eric had abandoned architecture and turned to art. He was described as "one of the most brilliant art students of his period". They had two sons, the first, Gavril, born in February 1915 and the second, Edward, in December 1919.

Eric, Cecile and the painter Dorothy Johnstone (1892–1980) had formed a close painting and physical liaison. In 1913, the three artists exhibited together at Edinburgh's New Gallery, and after the war they regrouped as the Edinburgh Group, now with Mary Newbery. However, Eric's excessive drinking led in 1923 to the collapse of the group and Cecile's moving in with Johnstone. In 1924, Walton had a joint exhibition with Johnstone in Edinburgh. However, her painting career foundered with their marriage, which ended in divorce in 1927. Walton 's painting faltered, but she did execute murals for the Children's Village in Humbie, Midlothian in the mid-1920s, and for Small's department store on Princes Street, Edinburgh, and she was also the art editor of Edinburgh University's Atlanta's Garland (1926) where she wrote on women's art in Scotland. She also turned to the theatre and worked for four seasons as a decor artist for Tyrone Guthrie at the Cambridge Festival Theatre. In 1936, Walton returned to Edinburgh and began working for BBC radio where she was in charge of the Scottish Children's Hour radio programming.

Eric's career also collapsed after their separation, and he eventually succumbed to alcohol. Walton remarried in 1936 to producer Gordon Gildard, with whom she moved to Glasgow, however this was another short-lived marriage and she divorced in 1945. She spent the rest of her life in Kirkcudbright.

She died in Edinburgh on 23 April 1956.

Walton is best known for her ironic self-portrait Romance, in which she depicts herself as a latter-day Olympia, critically inspecting her newborn son Edward, while both are watched by his sibling Gavril.

== Gallery ==
"Romance" (1920)

"The Swineherd"
Hans Andersen's Fairy Tales
