= Mary Newbery Sturrock =

Scottish artist (1892–1985)

Mary Newbury Sturrock
- Born: Mary Arbuckle Newbery; 21 September 1892; Glasgow, Scotland
- Died: 18 November 1985 (aged 93); Edinburgh, Scotland

Mary Newbery Sturrock, née Mary Arbuckle Newbery (21 September 1892 – 18 November 1985) was a Scottish artist who worked across various media. She is best known as an embroiderer and watercolour artist of flowers.

== Early life and career ==
Mary Newbery was born in Glasgow, the second daughter of the designer and embroider Jessie Newbery and Francis Henry Newbery, Director of the Glasgow School of Art after elder sister, Elsie (Margaret Elliot) Newbery. She was given the middle name "Arbuckle", a dedication to Margaret Arbuckle (d. 1892), the cousin of Jessie Newbery's father, William Rowat, after the death of his wife in 1873. Miss Arbuckle cared for the Rowat children, of which Jessie was the eldest.

The Newbery family were close friends with the Walton family of artists that included Mary's contemporary, Cecile Walton. The Walton family rented a summer house in the village of Wenhaston, on the Suffolk coast and the Newberys in nearby Walberswick. The artists William Oliver Hutchison and Eric Robertson – the latter, Cecile Walton's future husband – were part of the same artistic community that also visited Suffolk. During one such trip, Cecile Walton painted Eric Robertson and Mary Newbery relaxing next to the tennis court in the garden of the Walton's house. This portrait, regarded as Cecile Walton's first major oil painting, is held in the permanent collection of the National Galleries of Scotland.

Newbury studied in the Life School of Drawing and Painting at the Glasgow School of Art and was later a member of the Edinburgh Group of artists. During World War I she worked at a munitions factory in Tilbury and as a tracer for the De Havilland aircraft manufacturer.

On 21 October 1918, Newbury married the artist and Captain of the Royal Scots Alick Riddell Sturrock (1885-1953) in the Parish of Corfe Castle in Dorset. The pair were purposefully introduced to one another through Cecile Walton after Walton wrote to Sturrock to request his company while he was visiting the Suffolk coast on military business from France.

== Artistic career ==
In the summer of 1911 while visiting Suffolk, Mary Newbery, Cecile Walton, William Oliver Hutchison and Eric Robertson formed the artistic group 'The Idylls' named after the painting 'An Idyll' by artist Maurice Greiffenhagen. In 1913, the Group exhibited at the New Gallery at Shandwick Place in Edinburgh.

Post-World War I, Mary Newbery regularly exhibited work with the Edinburgh Group as an applied artist. At the second exhibition held by the group in 1920 at the New Gallery, she exhibited eighteen of the total seventy-nine exhibits. A set of embroidered cushions entered for the exhibition met with favourable reviews in The Scots Pictorial which noted Newbury's 'fine sense of colour and design are shown to great advantage.' Both Mary and Alick Sturrock were profiled in the retrospective touring exhibition 'The Edinburgh Group' in 1983 at the City Art Centre, Edinburgh. Mary submitted examples of her work across both the applied and decorative arts including floral watercolours, embroidery and ceramics. She also included a sketch-book containing flowers and figure drawings in pen, ink and watercolour.

Newbery exhibited paintings at the Royal Scottish Academy annual exhibition between 1915 and 1952. From 1935 to 1952, she submitted at least one watercolour painting each year to the exhibition while living in Edinburgh. The titles of these artworks such as 'A July bouquet' (1940) and 'Dusty miller posy' (1946) demonstrates the naturalistic themes of her work and the lasting influence of Frances Macdonald and Charles Rennie Mackintosh who Mary was friendly with throughout her childhood and at the outset of her career, given the couple's close acquaintance with her father, Fra Newbery. Charles Rennie Mackintosh worked on botanical watercolours in the later stages of his career and Mary would tell him the Latin names of flowers they both painted so that Mackintosh could inscribe them.

Newbery's earliest works were shown at the Royal Glasgow Institute of the Fine Arts. She exhibited at the Institute between 1911 and 1949 with many of the same works from the Royal Scottish Academy exhibition also featured in Glasgow.

== Later life ==
During the 1950s and following the death of her husband in 1953, Mary travelled extensively across Europe and internationally to China, Japan and Mexico. She gave interviews in later life to art historians and biographers about her intimate knowledge of the Glasgow School in which she had grown and flourished as a successful artist in her own right.
