= Amelia Sarah Levetus =

British-Austrian art historian

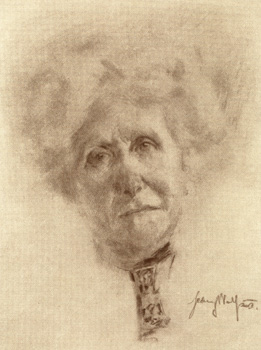
Amelia Sarah Levetus

Amelia Sarah Levetus (1853–1938) was a British-Austrian art historian, journalist, educator and feminist. After moving to Austria in 1891, she became the first woman to lecture at the University of Vienna when in February 1897 she gave two public lectures on Britain's cooperative movement. Soon afterwards she concentrated on the history of art, especially modern art. In 1898 she founded a school in Vienna, based on those in England, with a focus on art and the English language. In addition to her contributions to art journals, she published a number of books on Austrian art.

== Biography ==
Born in Birmingham in 1853, Levetus grew up in an active Jewish family environment with strong religious, literary and cultural interests. After schooling in Birmingham at King Edward's School, she attended the Midland Institute and Mason College before studying economics and teaching at the universities of Birmingham, St Andrews, Cambridge and Aberdeen. In 1891, she moved to Vienna where she taught English and became active as a journalist.

In 1897, she was invited to give two lectures at the University of Vienna on the cooperative movement in Great Britain, becoming the first woman to lecture at the university. Shortly afterwards, her interest turned from economics to art and culture, especially modern art which she had experienced through John Ruskin and William Morris while still in England. She began to associate with the Secession group of modern artists and those from the Kunstgewerbeschule who reflected the trends she had seen in Britain. This encouraged her to contribute to become the Viennese correspondent not only for the London art magazine The Studio but for several German-language periodicals. She also kept the Viennese informed of trends in British art by contributing to Kunst und Kunsthandwerk.

In 1904, she published Imperial Vienna: An Account of its History, Traditions and Arts, targeted at readers back in her native Britain. After articles on "Modern Decorative Art in Austria" and "The Art Revival in Austria" for The Studio, she collaborated with Michael Haberland to publish Peasant Art in Austria and Hungary in 1911, one of the first detailed accounts in English of Austrian folk art.

Despite being considered by some as belonging to the enemy during the First World War, she continued to teach, continuing the activities of the John Ruskin Club which promoted English conversation. This was later seen as evidence of the Volksheim's liberal outlook. In 1925, together with the historian Friedrich Hertz, she launched the Revue Reconstruction in support of the redevelopment of Austria. She also contributed to the women's movement in Vienna, lecturing on education and the improvement of conditions for women and for the working classes.

Levetus never married. She died in Vienna in 1938.
