= C. Lewis Hind =

British journalist and writer

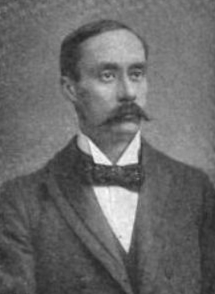
- In The Sketch, 11 November 1896
- Born: Charles Lewis Hind; 1862
- Died: 31 August 1927 (aged 64–65); London, England
- Occupation(s): Writer, editor, critic, historian

Charles Lewis Hind (1862–1927) was a British journalist, writer, editor, art critic and art historian.

== Biography ==
C. Lewis Hind was born in 1862. He served as the deputy editor of The Art Journal (1887–92) and the Pall Mall Budget. In 1893, he co-founded The Studio: An Illustrated Magazine of Fine and Applied Art. Three years later, Hind became the editor of The Academy and, after it merged with Literature, he continued with the editorship of The Academy and Literature, retiring in 1903. Hind then became a contributor to several magazines and newspapers including the Daily Chronicle, and wrote numerous articles on Post-Impressionism.

Eight colour photographic illustrations by Hind featured in Days with Velasquez (1906). His 1911 book The Post Impressionists was described by the Shirakaba group as "a most substantial book on the Post-Impressionists in English." After World War I, he compiled various anthologies and published several books on the art of landscape and continued with his art criticism. He interviewed Rockwell Kent on his Alaskan drawings in the June 1919 issue of International Studio.

He died in London on 31 August 1927.

== Selected works ==
- The Education of an Artist, 1906
- Days with Velasquez, 1906
- Turner's Golden Visions, 1907
- Days in Cornwall, 1907
- The Diary of a Looker-on, 1908
- The Drawings of Leonardo da Vinci, 1910
- The Consolations of a Critic, 1911
- The Post Impressionists, 1911
- Art and I, 1921
- Authors and I, 1921
- More Authors and I, 1922
- Landscape Painting, 1924
- Naphtali : being influences and adventures while earning a living by writing, 1926
