= The Studio (magazine) =

British arts magazine 1893–1964

The Studio: An Illustrated Magazine of Fine and Applied Art
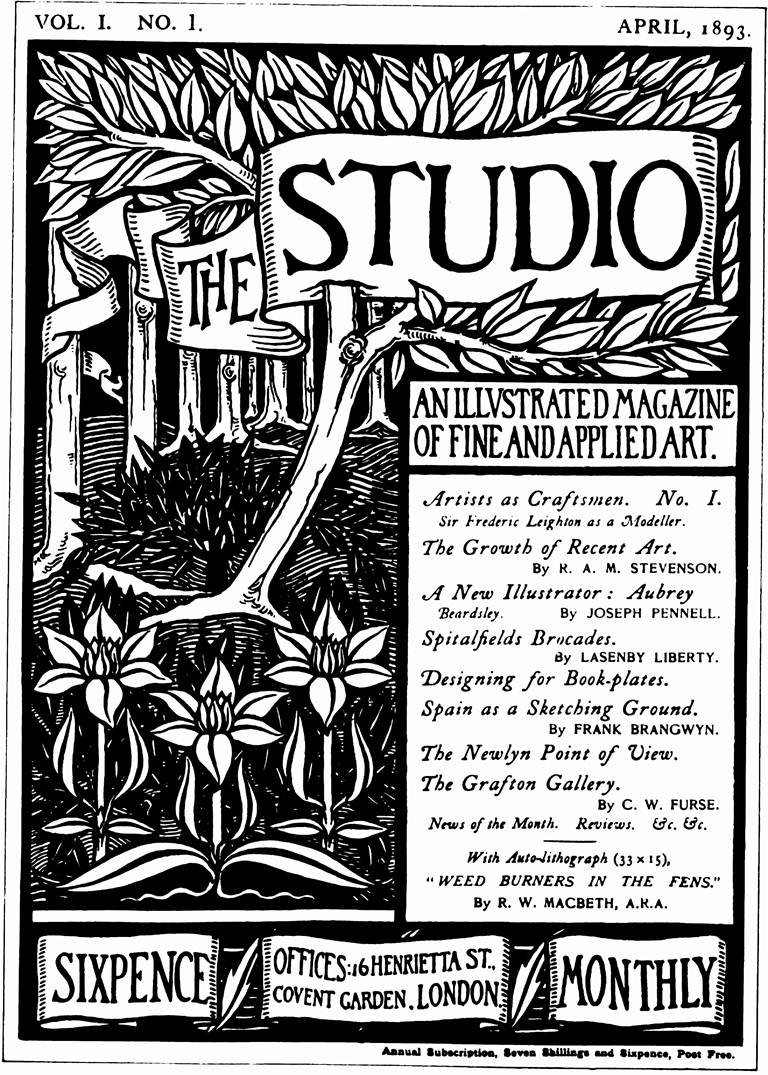
- Cover by Aubrey Beardsley for the first issue of The Studio
- Editor: Joseph Gleeson White; Charles Holme; Geoffrey Holme
- Categories: fine arts, decorative arts
- Frequency: monthly
- Publisher: Offices of The Studio; "The Studio" Ltd.
- Founder: Charles Holme
- Founded: 1893
- First issue: April 1893
- Final issue Number: May 1964; 853
- Country: United Kingdom
- Based in: London
- Language: English
- ISSN: 0963-5092

The Studio: An Illustrated Magazine of Fine and Applied Art was an illustrated fine arts and decorative arts magazine published in London from 1893 until 1964. The founder and first editor was Charles Holme. The magazine exerted a major influence on the development of the Art Nouveau and Arts and Crafts movements. It was absorbed into Studio International magazine in 1964.

Holmes' firm, The Studio, Ltd., grew to be "Britain's largest publisher of magazines and books on art and design in the first half of the 20th century".

== History ==
The Studio was founded by Charles Holme in 1893. Holme was in the wool and silk trades, had travelled extensively in Europe and had visited Japan and the United States with Lasenby Liberty and his wife Emma. During his travels he had formed:

... the idea of an art magazine crystallised around his recurring observation that the chief barrier between countries was language, and his belief that the more the culture of one part of the world could be brought "visually" to the attention of another, the greater the chance of international understanding and peace.

He retired from trade in order to start The Studio.

He had hoped to engage Lewis Hind as the editor of the new venture, but Hind went instead to William Waldorf Astor's Pall Mall Budget. He suggested Joseph Gleeson White as an alternative. Gleeson White edited The Studio from the first issue in April 1893. In 1895 Holme took over as editor himself, although Gleeson White continued to contribute. Holme retired as editor in 1919 for reasons of health, and was succeeded by his son Charles Geoffrey Holme, who was already the editor of special numbers and year-books of the magazine.

== The magazine ==
The magazine was monthly; 853 issues were published between April 1893 and May 1964.

The Studio promoted the work of "New Art" artists, designers and architects. It played a major part in introducing the work of Charles Rennie Mackintosh and Charles Voysey to a wide audience, and was especially influential in Europe.

In keeping with Holme's original concept, the magazine was international in scope. A French edition was published in Paris, differing from the English one only in that the spine and parts of the cover were printed in French, and there was an insert consisting of a French translation of the article text and some French advertisements.

The American edition was titled The International Studio. It had its own editorial staff, and the content was different from that of the English edition, although many articles from that were reprinted. It was published in New York by John Lane & Company from May 1897 until 1921, and by International Studio, Inc., from 1922 until publication ceased in 1931.

In 1894 and then from 1896 on, special numbers of the magazine were also published, normally three times a year. These carried various titles; 117 of them were issued between 1894 and 1940.

From 1906 onwards The Studio published an annual, The Studio Year-Book of Decorative Art, which dealt with architecture, interior design and design of furniture, lighting, glassware, textiles, metalwork and ceramics. These annuals promoted Modernism in the 1920s, and later the Good Design movement.

The last edition was published in May 1964, after which it was absorbed into Studio International.

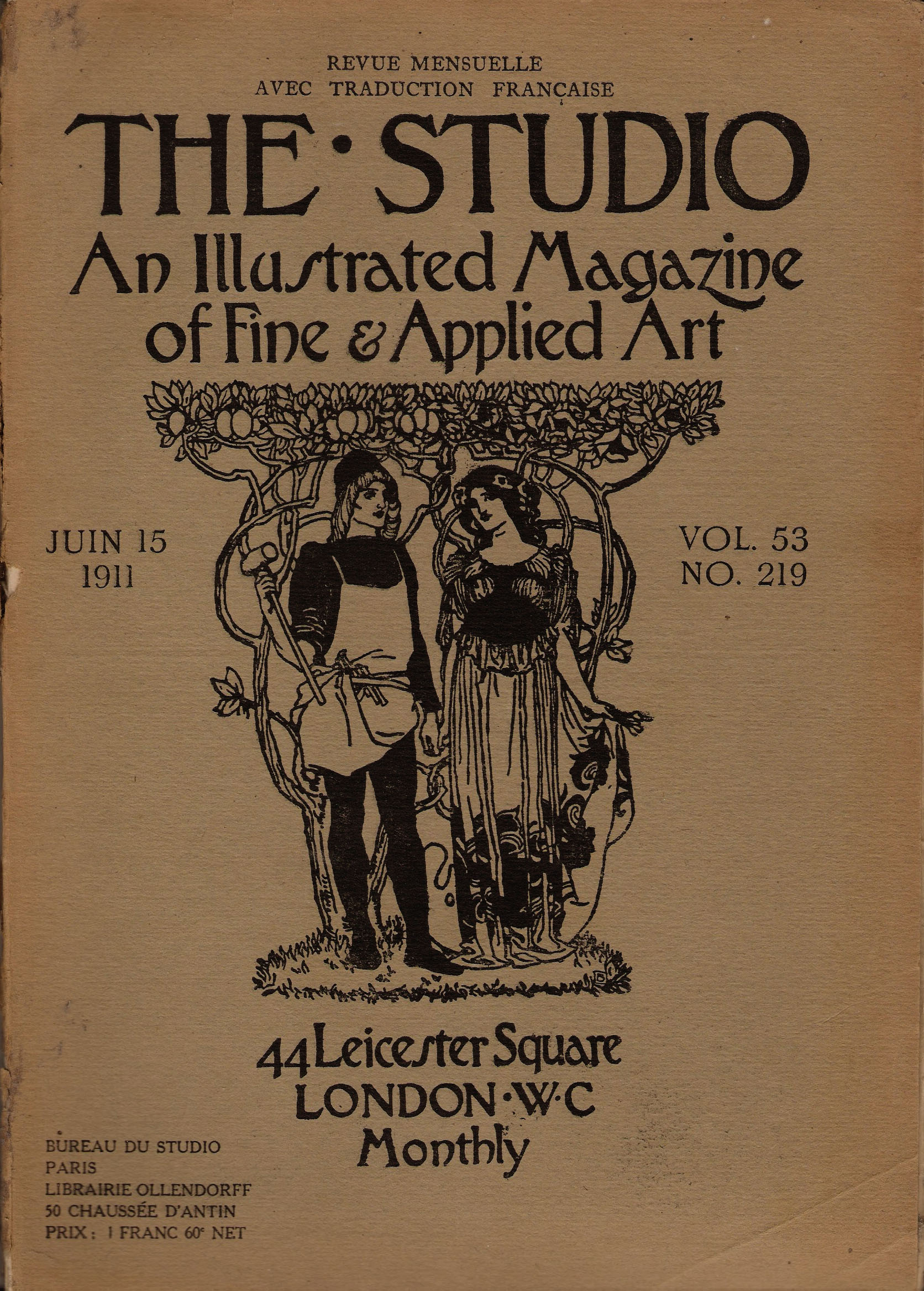
Cover of the Paris edition of The Studio, volume 53 no. 219, June 1911

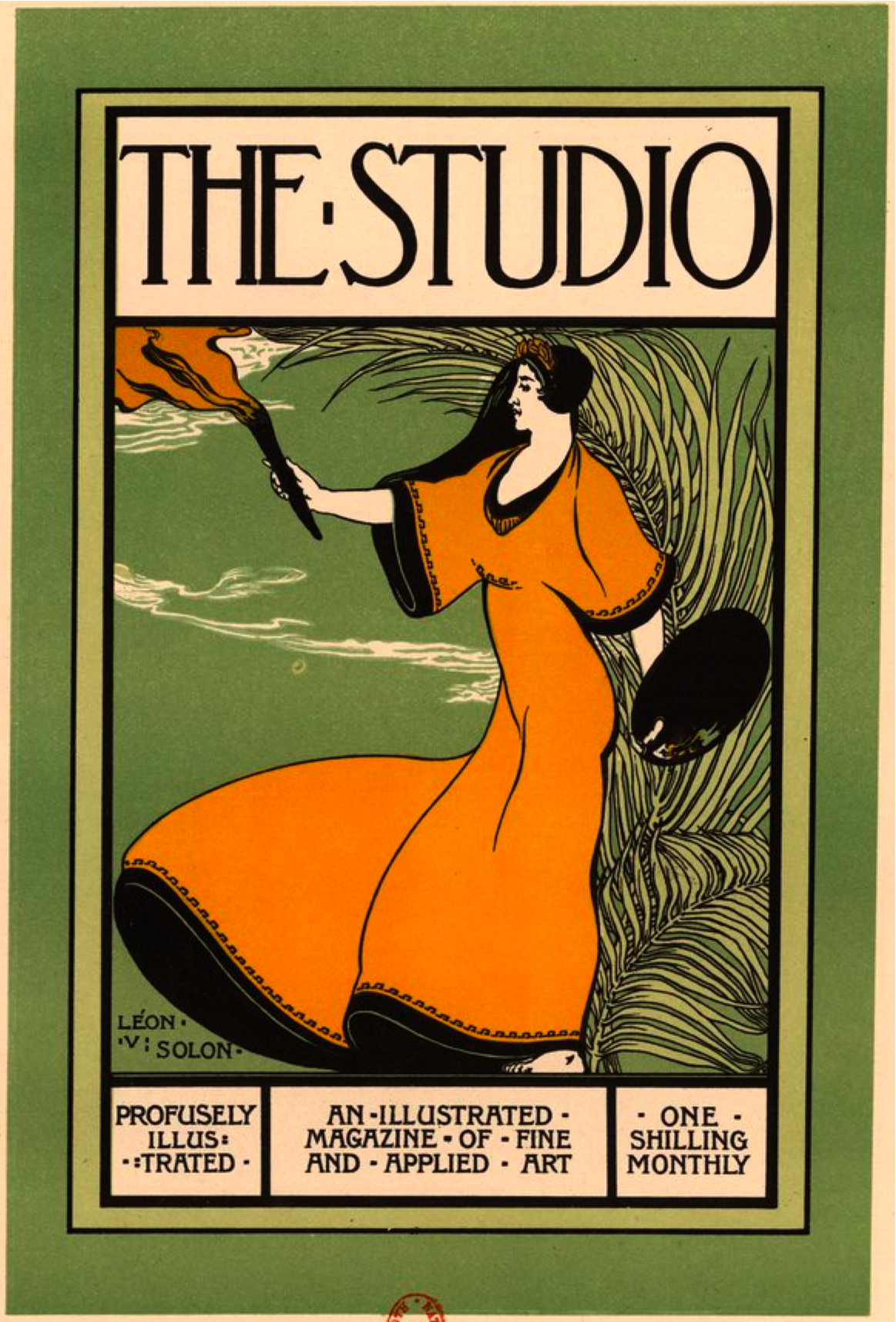
Poster by Léon-Victor Solon advertising The Studio

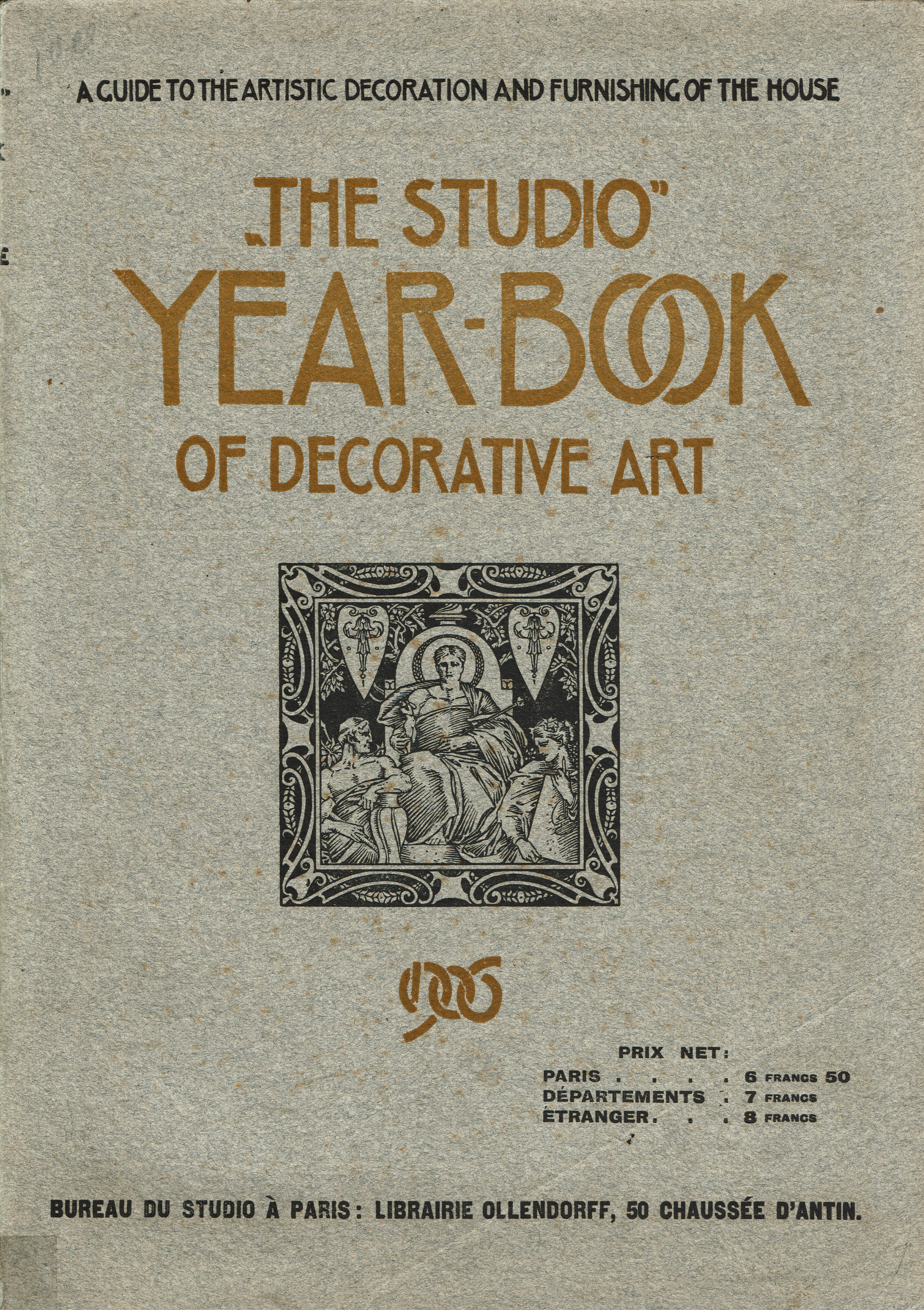
Cover of the first Year-Book, 1906

== Book series ==
Special numbers of The Studio were edited by the Holmes for separate publication as books. In addition the following book series were issued:

- Currier & Ives Prints
- Famous Sporting Prints
- Famous Water-Colour Painters
- For Collectors - facsimile reproductions of great manuscripts
- The Gardens of England
- Great Periods in Art
- Hours of Leisure Series
- How To Do It Series
- How to Draw
- Make It Yourself Series (a.k.a. A Make It Yourself Book series)
- Master Draughtsmen
- Masters of Painting
- Masters of the Colour Print
- Modern Masters of Etching (sometimes referred on dustjackets as Masters of Etching)
- Modern Photography
- The New Vision
- The Studio Painting Series
- Treasures of Art
- Treasures of Illumination
- The World's Masters
- The World's Masters: New Series
