= List of alumni of the Royal College of Art =

The following is a list of alumni of the Royal College of Art, London, and of its predecessor schools before 1896: the Government School of Design or Metropolitan School of Design, the Normal Training School of Art and the National Art Training School.

== A ==
- Kristian Aadnevik, fashion designer
- Faisal Abdu'allah, printmaker
- Gerald Abramovitz
- M. R. Acharekar, painter, art director
- Jane Ackroyd, sculptor
- Norman Ackroyd
- Mark Adams (designer)
- David Adjaye, architect
- Edgar Ainsworth (artist)
- Shadi Al-Atallah
- Griselda Allan
- Charlie Allen (designer)
- Kathleen Allen
- Paul J Allen (set designer)
- W. H. Allen
- Anthea Alley
- Helen Allingham, painter
- Edward Allington
- Victor Ambrus, illustrator
- Hurvin Anderson
- Kay Anderson
- Marie Angel (artist)
- Peggy Angus
- Pascal Anson
- Lorenzo Apicella
- Leonard Appelbee, painter
- Billy Apple, artist and designer
- Val Archer, painter
- Princess Louise, Duchess of Argyll
- Audrey Arnott
- Pamela Ascherson
- Ruth Spencer Aspden
- Katerina Athanasopoulou, film maker and animation artist
- Jeremy Atherton Lin, writer
- Frank Auerbach, painter
- Robert Austin (artist)
- Maxwell Ayrton, architect

== B ==
- Marjorie May Bacon
- Joseph Ridgard Bagshawe
- Fred Baier
- Christopher Bailey (fashion designer)
- Eve Baker
- Alfred Lys Baldry
- Barbara Banister
- Tom Barker (designer)
- Jonathan Barnbrook, typographer and graphic designer
- Brian Barnes (artist)
- Glenys Barton
- Michael Bartlett
- Pauline Baumann
- Lewis Baumer
- Edward Bawden
- Arlon Bayliss, visual artist
- John Beard (artist)
- Cressida Bell, textile designer
- Peter Bellamy
- John Bellany
- Sebastian Bergne, industrial designer
- Christine Berrie, illustrator
- Arthur Berry (playwright)
- Clara Billing, sculptor
- Dora Billington
- Helen Binyon
- Henry Bird, muralist
- Sutapa Biswas
- David Blackburn (artist), landscape artist
- William Kay Blacklock
- Doris Blair
- Peter Blake, painter
- Quentin Blake, cartoonist, author and illustrator
- Douglas Bliss
- Eric Boman, photographer
- Tord Boontje industrial designer
- Allen Boothroyd, industrial designer
- Nicholas Borden, painter
- Deirdre Borlase, painter
- Derek Boshier, painter
- Pauline Boty
- Doris Boulton-Maude
- Denis Bowen
- Moya Bowler
- Frank Bowling, painter
- William Bowyer (artist)
- Alan Boyson, muralist
- Boyd Webb
- John Bratby
- Kathleen Bridle
- John Frederick Brill
- Alison Britton
- Iris Brooke
- Jason Brooks (illustrator)
- Frederick Brown (artist)
- Percy Brown (art historian)
- Ralph Brown (sculptor)
- Sheilagh Brown, fashion designer
- William Kellock Brown, sculptor
- Kathleen Browne (artist)
- John Brunsdon
- Fatma Bucak
- Kenneth Budd
- John Bunting (sculptor)
- Victor Burgin, 1986 Turner Prize nominee
- Edward Burra
- James Butler (artist)

== C ==
- Charles William Cain, artist
- Joyce W. Cairns
- Alexander Milne Calder, sculptor
- Ian Callum
- Moray Callum
- Gillian Carnegie, 2005 Turner Prize nominee
- David Carpanini, painter and printmaker
- Henry Carr, painter
- George Bertram Carter
- Michelle Cartlidge, illustrator
- James Castle (sculptor)
- Catherine Dean (artist)
- Patrick Caulfield, 1987 Turner Prize nominee
- Joseph Hermon Cawthra, sculptor
- George Chakravarthi, artist
- Jack Bridger Chalker, painter
- Catherine Chalmers
- Lu Chao
- Charles Chaplin (artist)
- Jake and Dinos Chapman, 2003 Turner Prize nominees
- Malvina Cheek, artist
- Bernard Cheese
- Marvin Gaye Chetwynd
- Gordon Cheung
- Emma Chichester Clark
- Madeleine Child
- Betty Churcher, director of the National Gallery of Australia, 1990–1997
- John Clappison, ceramic and glass designer
- Ossie Clark, fashion designer
- Bob Carlos Clarke
- Sir George Clausen, painter
- Benjamin Clemens, sculptor
- Clarice Cliff, ceramic designer, modeller and sculptor
- Sue Coe, political artist
- Ernest A. Cole, sculptor and printmaker
- Freda Coleborn
- Cecil Collins
- Elisabeth Collins
- Richard Cook, painter
- Jean Cooke, artist
- May Louise Greville Cooksey, painter
- Eileen Cooper
- Susie Cooper, ceramic designer
- Marcus Cornish
- Celestino Coronado Romero, film director
- Lucy Cousins
- Jack Coutu, printmaker and sculptor
- Jenny Cowern
- Raymond Teague Cowern
- Hilda Cowham
- Raymond Coxon, painter
- Gary Coyle, photographer and artist
- Roderick Coyne, sculptor
- Stuart Craig, production designer
- Tony Cragg, 1988 Turner Prize winner
- Andrew Cranston
- Reed Crawford
- Keith Critchlow
- Stella Rebecca Crofts
- Edward Cronshaw
- Neisha Crosland, textile designer
- Victoria Crowe
- Robert Crowther (author), children's book author and paper engineer
- Virginia Cruz
- Bill Culbert, painter, sculptor, photographer
- Frederick Cuming (artist)
- Michael Cumming, director, filmmaker
- Charles Cundall, war artist

== D ==
- Anna Dabis
- Dexter Dalwood
- Jill Daniels
- Leonard Daniels
- Adam Dant, 2002 Jerwood Prize winner
- Frances Darlington
- Leslie Davenport, artist and teacher
- Alki David
- Shezad Dawood
- David Dawson (painter)
- Lucienne Day
- Robin Day (designer)
- Richard Deacon, sculptor, 1987 Turner Prize winner
- Roger Dean (artist)
- Len Deighton, historian and author
- Elise D'Elboux
- Thomas Derrick (artist)
- Mukul Dey, painter, engraver
- Ted Dicks
- Emilia, Lady Dilke, art historian
- Jane Dillon, designer and artist
- Emmy Dinkel-Keet
- Austin Dobson, poet
- Christopher Dresser, designer
- Conrad Dressler, sculptor and potter
- Lilian Dring
- Barry Driscoll
- William Harold Dudley
- Thomas Cantrell Dugdale
- Evelyn Dunbar, artist
- Jacqueline Durran
- Ian Dury, musician, singer
- James Dyson, designer

== E ==
- Harry Eccleston
- Mildred Eldridge
- Nabil El-Nayal
- Frederick Vincent Ellis
- Tom Ellis (architect)
- David Emanuel (fashion designer)
- Joseph Emberton
- Benoit Pierre Emery, fashion designer
- Tracey Emin, artist, 1999 Turner Prize nominee
- Nora England
- Grace English
- Arthur John Ensor, artist and industrial designer
- Helen Escobedo
- Vincent Evans

== F ==
- Wilfred Fairclough
- Steve Fairnie
- Sara Fanelli
- Stephen Farthing
- Cathie Felstead, illustrator
- Sir Luke Fildes, painter
- Anthony Finkelstein
- Archie Fisher (painter)
- Alan Fletcher (graphic designer)
- Marion Foale, fashion designer
- Juan Fontanive
- Elizabeth Forbes (artist)
- Michael Foreman (author/illustrator)
- Gordon Forsyth
- John Foxx
- Barnett Freedman
- Henry Charles Innes Fripp, artist, stained glass maker, illustrator
- Elizabeth Fritsch, ceramic artist, potter
- George Fullard
- Ron Fuller (artist)
- Hamish Fulton
- Holly Fulton
- John Furnival (1933–2020), poet
- Anton Furst, production designer

== G ==
- Jeremy Gardiner
- Margaret Garland
- David Gentleman
- Geoffrey Clarke
- Walter Sykes George, architect
- Bill Gibb
- Evelyn Gibbs, artist
- Jean Gibson, sculptor and teacher
- Jeffrey Gibson
- John Gillard, teacher of advertising and design
- Ernest Gillick
- Mary Gillick, sculptor
- John Gilroy (artist)
- Edna Ginesi
- Gerald Gladstone
- Keith Godwin
- Mick Gold
- Stephen Goldblatt
- Grace Golden, artist
- John Goldschmidt, film director and producer
- João Gonzalez, animator
- Noémie Goudal, photographer
- James Henry Govier, painter, etcher and engraver
- Margaret Green, painter
- Kate Greenaway, illustrator
- Eileen Greenwood, artist and printmaker
- Ernest Greenwood, painter of watercolours
- Helen Frances Gregor
- Eleanor Gribble
- John Griffiths
- Kate Groobey, painter
- Sunil Gupta
- Karen Guthrie
- Richard Guyatt

== H ==
- Elpida Hadzi-Vasileva
- Reginald George Haggar
- Henry Haig
- Lorna Hamilton-Brown
- William Harbutt, sculptor and inventor of Plasticine
- George Hardie (artist)
- Anne Hardy
- Sophie Harley, jewellery designer
- Chris Harrison (photographer)
- Max Hattler, visual artist and animator
- Raymond Hawkey, designer and author
- Thomas Heatherwick, designer and sculptor
- John Hedgecoe, photographer
- Keith Helfet
- Guy Hendrix Dyas, production designer
- Barbara Hepworth, sculptor
- Hubert von Herkomer painter, composer, film maker
- Hilda Hewlett, aviator
- Kyoko Hidaka, color theorist
- Gert Hildebrand
- Adrian Hill
- Rose Hilton
- Lubaina Himid
- Edith Mary Hinchley
- David Hockney, painter
- Rayner Hoff
- Eileen Hogan, painter
- Elizabeth Bradford Holbrook
- Nigel Holmes
- Sigrid Holmwood
- Gerald Holtom
- Peter Horbury
- Percy Horton
- Kathleen Horsman
- Laurence Housman, playwright
- Hitomi Hosono, ceramicist
- Albert Houthuesen, artist
- Ken Howard (artist)
- Erlund Hudson, artist
- Robert Alwyn Hughes
- Mustafa Hulusi
- Angus Hyland

== I ==
- Kamala Ibrahim
- Bryan Ingham, etcher, painter and sculptor
- Judy Inglis
- James Irvine (designer)
- Keith Irvine
- Runa Islam

== J ==
- Alison Jackson
- Charles Sargeant Jagger
- Apu Jan, fashion designer
- Merlin James, artist, critic
- Nour Jaouda, textile artist
- Jannuzzi Smith
- James Jarvis (illustrator)
- Gertrude Jekyll, garden designer
- Travis Jeppesen, writer
- Chantal Joffe, painter
- Jasper Joffe, artist
- Laurel Johannesson, painter, multimedia
- Claude Johnson
- Alfred Garth Jones, illustrator
- Allen Jones, artist
- Barbara Jones (artist)
- Lucy Jones (artist)
- Lily Delissa Joseph
- Betty Jukes, sculptor
- Jagannath Panda painter, sculptor

== K ==
- Jozef Kabaň, car designer
- Asif Kapadia, film director
- Geeta Kapur
- John Francis Kavanagh Diploma in Sculpture 1928
- Daniel Kearns (designer)
- Patrick Keiller
- Flora Kendrick
- Jonathan Kenworthy, sculptor
- Morris Kestelman
- Idris Khan
- Rajan Khosa
- Ian Kiaer
- Orla Kiely
- Katharine Kimball
- Ada Florence Kinton
- John Kirby, painter
- R. B. Kitaj, artist
- Alan Kitching, typographer
- Linda Kitson
- Afroditi Krassa
- Henry Krokatsis

== L ==
- Edwin La Dell
- Simon Larbalestier, photographer
- Nora Fry Lavrin
- Geoff Lawson (designer)
- Noel Leaver, painter
- Gilbert Ledward
- Lee Jinjoon, artist
- Lawrence Lee
- Dante Leonelli, artist
- Audrey Levy, designer
- Philippa Lindenthal, designer
- Jessie Lipscomb
- Elizabeth Jane Lloyd
- Mark Lloyd, car designer
- Fiona Lloyd-Davies
- John Hodgson Lobley
- Hew Locke
- Bernard Lodge, graphic designer
- Edwin Lutyens, architect

== M ==
- Frances Macdonald, painter
- Julien Macdonald
- David Mach, 1988 Turner Prize nominee
- Kirsteen Mackay
- Steve Mackey, musician
- Ian Mackenzie-Kerr
- Steve Mackey
- Thomas MacLaren
- Jane McAdam Freud
- Charles Mahoney
- Kate Malone studio potter
- Peter Jacob Maltz, sculptor
- Melanie Manchot
- Edna Mann
- Mick Manning
- Jeremy Marre, film director
- Walter Marsden
- Robert Burkall Marsh
- Kenneth Martin, sculptor
- Mary Martin
- Mary Martin (artist)
- Penny Martin
- Simon Martin (Mayanist)
- Enid Marx
- Benedict Mason
- Robin Mason
- Arthur Max
- Donald Maxwell, artist and illustrator
- Hannah Maybank
- Enda McCallion
- Gerald McCann (fashion designer)
- Christopher McDonnell
- David McFall
- Gerry McGovern
- Colin McNaughton
- Carol McNicoll
- Chris Meigh-Andrews
- Ellen Meijers
- David Mellor, cutler and industrial designer
- Zoë Mendelson
- Mortimer Menpes, artist
- Kobena Mercer
- Gerald Fenwick Metcalfe
- Percy Metcalfe
- Katharine Meynell
- Hilary Miller
- John W. Mills, sculptor
- Russell Mills, multimedia artist and musician
- Dhruva Mistry
- Crawford Mitchell
- Maggie Mitchell, sculptor
- Ursula Mommens
- Henrietta Montalba, sculptor
- Esther Moore, sculptor
- Henry Moore, sculptor
- Raymond Moore (photographer)
- Erdem Moralioğlu, fashion designer
- Katy Moran
- Harry Morley, artist and illustrator
- Malcolm Morley, 1984 Turner Prize winner
- Jasper Morrison, designer
- Mary Morton, sculptor
- Colin Moss, artist and teacher
- Charles Mozley
- Matthieu Muller, industrial designer
- Sophie Muller
- Charlie Murphy (artist)
- Alison Murray
- William Grant Murray
- Peter Musson, silversmith
- Lawrence Mynott
- Frances Murphy textile artist

== N ==
- Philip Naviasky
- Deborah Nadoolman Landis
- Vera Neubauer
- Rhoda Holmes Nicholls
- Simon Nicholson
- Mike Nuttall
- Charlotte Newman

== O ==
- Una O'Connor, actor
- Sinéad O'Dwyer, Irish fashion designer
- Chris Ofili, 1998 Turner Prize winner
- Lucille Oille
- Laura Oldfield Ford
- Marilene Oliver, sculptor
- M. C. Oliver, calligrapher
- Vaughan Oliver, designer and graphic designer
- Peter Olley, English printmaker
- Chris Orr, English artist
- Christopher Orr, Scottish artist
- Jay Osgerby, designer
- Thérèse Oulton
- Graham Ovenden
- Roy Oxlade, painter
- Lawson Oyekan

== P ==
- Tom Palin, painter
- Lilian Parker, sculptor
- Susan Parkinson, ceramic artist
- Eric Parry
- Stephen Partridge
- John Pasche
- Alicia Paz
- Muriel Pemberton
- Graham Percy
- Tony Pettman
- Peter Phillips (artist)
- Cathie Pilkington
- Michael Pinsky
- John Piper (artist)
- Keith Piper (artist)
- Vivian Pitchforth, painter
- Platon (photographer)
- John Platt (artist)
- Michael Please
- Fergus Pollock
- Constance Mary Pott
- Cherry Potter
- Alice Potts
- Edward Poynter, artist
- Jane Price, painter
- Margaret Priest
- Simon Pummell
- William Pye (sculptor)

== Q ==
- Brothers Quay, stop-motion animators

== R ==
- Fiona Raby
- Alma Ramsey
- Tissa Ranasinghe
- Eric Ravilious
- Raymond Ray-Jones
- Ruth Raymond
- Mary Remington
- Alan Reynolds (artist)
- Lis Rhodes
- Zandra Rhodes, fashion designer
- Ceri Richards, painter
- Frances Richards (British artist)
- Sophy Rickett, visual artist
- Alan Rickman, actor
- Arthur Dewhurst Riley
- Bridget Riley, artist
- Michael Rizzello
- John Romer (Egyptologist)
- Frank Roper
- Johnny Rozsa, photographer
- Frank Runacres
- Joseph Rykwert

== S ==
- Astrid Sampe
- Kenneth Sandford
- Bianca Saunders, fashion designer
- Janek Schaefer, composer
- Tony Scherman
- Herbert Gustave Schmalz
- Peter Schreyer
- Ridley Scott, film director
- Robert M Scott. Interior architecture
- Tony Scott, film director
- Florian Seidl
- Uday Shankar, choreographer
- George Shaw (artist), Turner Prize nominee 2011
- Elaine Shemilt
- Clare Shenstone
- Marjorie Sherlock
- Simon Shore
- Stefan Sielaff
- Norman Sillman, coin designer
- John William Simpson
- Lilian Simpson
- Peter Sís, artist and illustrator
- Yvonne Skargon, wood engraver and illustrator
- Mary Annie Sloane
- Walter Smith (art educator)
- Arthur Smith (illustrator)
- Graham Smith (milliner)
- Graham Smith (photographer)
- Jack Smith (artist)
- Martin Smith (designer)
- Martin Smith (potter)
- Paul M. Smith (photographer)
- Richard Smith (artist)
- Walter Smith, industrial art educator
- Susan Weber Soros
- Alan Sorrell, archaeological reconstruction artist
- Ruskin Spear
- A. B. S. Sprigge
- Henry Stannard
- Mary Stainbank
- Julian Stair
- Cecil Stephenson, artist
- Peter Stevens (car designer)
- Stuart Stockdale, fashion designer
- Susan Stockwell
- Tim Stoner
- Paul Stopforth
- Mike Stott
- Madeleine Strindberg

Anthony Sully, interior designer, silver medallist 1965

- Linda Sutton, painter, RCA 100 mural prize 1972
- Hiroshi Suzuki (silversmith), Silversmith
- Charles Robinson Sykes

== T ==
- Abdul Rahman Taha
- Kam Tang
- Jeremy Tankard
- Eric Taylor
- Leonard Campbell Taylor
- Alice Temperley
- Suzie Templeton, director of animated films, winner of Academy Award 2008
- Patrick Thomas (graphic artist)
- Elizabeth Thompson (Lady Butler), painter
- Storm Thorgerson, photographer and designer
- Jake Tilson, artist
- Joe Tilson, artist
- Sue Timney
- Carl Toms
- Martin Travers, designer, stained glass artist
- Philip Treacy
- David Tremlett, artist, Turner Prize nominee 1992
- Newbury Abbot Trent
- Helen Mabel Trevor
- Ernest William Tristram
- John Tunnard, artist
- Charles Tunnicliffe, painter
- Gavin Turk, artist
- Richard Turner (artist)
- Sidney Tushingham, painter and etcher
- Alice Twemlow
- Mary Fraser Tytler

== U ==
- Michael Upton

== V ==
- Marjan van Aubel
- Dirk van Braeckel
- Katrina van Gruow
- Paul Vanstone
- Markus Vater
- Eugenia Vronskaya

== W ==
- Paul Wager, painter and sculptor
- Janice Wainwright (fashion designer)
- Ray Walker, mural artist, 1945–1984
- Melanie Walsh, children's book illustrator
- Suling Wang, artist
- Albert Watson (photographer)
- Robert Welch (designer)
- Richard Wentworth, sculptor
- David Wheatley (director)
- Fred Whisstock, illustrator
- Valerie Wiffen, painter
- David Wightman (painter)
- Alison Wilding, 1992 Turner Prize nominee
- Christopher Williams (Welsh artist), 1873–1934
- Garth Williams
- Eli Marsden Wilson
- John David Wilson
- Joash Woodrow, painter
- Alice B. Woodward
- Ernest Worrall
- Sönke Wortmann
- Jon Wozencroft, graphic designer
- Run Wrake, animator
- Andrea Wulf
- Jan Wurm, painter
- Rose Wylie, painter
- Cerith Wyn Evans
- Althea Wynne, sculptor

== Y ==
- Carey Young, artist
- Yuan Cai and Jian Jun Xi

== Z ==
- Astrid Zydower
