= Charles Murphy =

Charles or Charlie Murphy may refer to:

== Politics ==
- Charles Murphy (1880–1958), Irish politician more commonly referred to as Cathal Ó Murchadha
- Charles Murphy (Australian politician) (1909–1997), member of the Victorian Legislative Assembly
- Charles Murphy (Canadian politician) (1862–1935), member from Russell in the Canadian House of Commons 1908–1925 and senator 1925–1935
- Charles A. Murphy (born 1965), Massachusetts representative from the 21st District
- Charles Frederick Murphy (1875–1934), New York politician
- Charles Francis Murphy (1858–1924), American political figure who was leader of Tammany Hall 1902–1924
- Charles S. Murphy (1909–1983), White House counsel during the Truman Administration 1951–1953
- Terrence Murphy (Canadian politician) (Charles Terrence Murphy, 1926–2008), member from Sault Ste. Marie in the Canadian House of Commons 1968–1972

== Sports ==
- Charles Minthorn Murphy (1870–1950), American cyclist, known as "Mile-a-Minute Murphy"
- Charles M. Murphy (coach) (1913–1999), American football, basketball, and baseball player and coach
- Stretch Murphy (Charles C. Murphy, 1907–1992), All-American basketball player at Purdue University
- Charles Murphy (baseball owner) (1868–1931), baseball executive and sportswriter
- Charles Murphy (pitcher), American Negro leagues baseball player

== Arts and entertainment ==
- Charlie Murphy (actor) (1959–2017), American writer, actor, and stand-up comedian
- Charlie Murphy (artist), artist based in London, UK
- Charlie Murphy (singer-songwriter) (1953–2016), American singer-songwriter
- Charlie Murphy (actress) (born 1988), Irish actress
- Chuck Murphy (singer) (born 1955), American singer, songwriter, and musician

== Other ==
- Charles Murphy (architect) (1890–1985), American architect
- Charles M. Murphy (priest), Catholic priest, former rector of the Pontifical North American College
- Charles B. G. Murphy (1906–1977), pioneer and philanthropist in psychiatry
- Chuck Murphy (bishop) (1947–2018), American Anglican bishop
- Charles Murphy (hedge fund manager) (1961–2017), American hedge fund manager
- Charles J. V. Murphy (1904–1987), American journalist and author
