= Chuck Murphy =

Chuck Murphy may refer to:

- Chuck Murphy (bishop)
- Chuck Murphy (politician)
- Chuck Murphy (singer)

== See also ==
- Charles Murphy (disambiguation)
