= William Blacklock =

William Blacklock may refer to:

- William James Blacklock (1816–1858), English landscape painter
- William Kay Blacklock (1870–1924), British watercolours and oils artist
- William Blacklock (mayor) (1889–1965), New Zealand politician, mayor of Henderson

== See also ==
- William Blacklock House, a historic building in Charleston, South Carolina
