= Vanessa Lloyd-Davies =

British physician, equestrian and soldier (1960–2005)

Captain (Local Major) Vanessa Lloyd-Davies MBE
- Born: Susan Vanessa Lloyd-Davies; 30 November 1960; London, England, United Kingdom
- Died: 16 February 2005 (aged 44); Leicestershire, England, United Kingdom
- Citizenship: United Kingdom
- Education: Benenden School
- Alma mater: Lady Margaret Hall, Oxford
- Occupations: Doctor; Equestrian; Soldier
- Spouse: Andrew Jacks (m. 1988; div. 2005)

Susan Vanessa Lloyd-Davies MBE (30 November 1960 – 16 February 2005) was a British doctor, equestrian and soldier. Educated at Benenden School and at Lady Margaret Hall, Oxford, she matriculated at St Thomas's Hospital Medical School and joined the Royal Army Medical Corps (RAMC) in 1990. Lloyd-Davies treated injured Bosnian war children in Sarajevo as part of the United Nations Protection Force in mid-1992. She then became a general practitioner in the Barbican in central London and a medical officer civilian attached to the King's Troop of the Royal Horse Artillery in the British Army. As an eventer, Lloyd-Davies rode a cross-country horse across all levels. She was appointed Member of the Order of the British Empire in the Military Division in 1993.

== Early life ==
On 30 November 1960, Lloyd-Davies was born in London, England. She was part of a medical family going back nine generations, and has Welsh roots. Lloyd-Davies was the oldest daughter of Reginald Wyndham Lloyd-Davies, a uriologist, and his wife Elizabeth. She has one sister, Fiona Lloyd-Davies. At the age of 13, Lloyd-Davies took up what would become her life long hobby of hunting, encouraged by Reginald Paget, Baron Paget of Northampton. She had hunted for the Fernie, Quorn and Pytchley. Lloyd-Davies received a classical education at Benenden School in Kent. She read physiology at Lady Margaret Hall, Oxford and went to matriculate at St Thomas's Hospital Medical School in London for training.

== Career ==
Lloyd-Davies joined the British Army in 1986, and in 1990, joined the Royal Army Medical Corps. She served in Germany, and was subsequently commissioned to the Household Cavalry, becoming its first female medical officer amongst an all-male environment. When the United Nations Protection Force went back to Sarajevo in June 1992 after being forced to evacuate the city the previous month, Lloyd-Davies was assigned to treat injured Bosnian war children coming under mortar fire in Sarajevo; she was the sole British citizen in her group. She provided the medical back-up before being joined by a French field hospital. One notable patient Lloyd-Davies treated was the BBC correspondent Martin Bell after he was injured by flying mortar fragments in August 1992 at the British field hospital in Zagreb. Douglas Hurd, the Foreign Secretary, wrote about how safe he felt under her care and she was praised by Hew Pike. Lloyd-Davies ran trauma courses for the Special Air Service.

Lloyd-Davies subsequently returned to civilian life and became a general practitioner in the Barbican in central London but she went back to the British Army as a medical officer civilian attached to the King's Troop of the Royal Horse Artillery. She focused more on eventing, riding the cross-country horse Don Giovanni II from the pre-novice to the Badminton and Burghley three-day horse trials. Lloyd-Davies rode in the 2002 Burghley Horse Trials that September. She retired from the 2003 Badminton Horse Trials following the dressage attempt and competed in the following year's Badminton Horse Trials, where she finished equal 27th; Lloyd-Davies lent the ride to Matthew Davies after picking up an injury.

== Personal life ==
In the 1993 Birthday Honours, she was appointed Member of the Order of the British Empire in the Military Division, "for bravery and humanitarian care". From 1988 to January 2005, Lloyd-Davies was married to the Balkans Civil War veteran Andrew Jacks. She was granted sick leave from the King's Troop in April 2004 due to acute depression, concerning her family. On 16 February 2005, Lloyd-Davies died by suicide at her home in Leicestershire. She is buried at Ilston St Michael & All Angels Church.

== Legacy ==
A mid-2006 concert was held in Lloyd-Davies's honour led by Rainer Küchl, the master of the Vienna Philharmonic Orchestra, to raise funding for repairs and restoration to several Leicestershire churches. A memorial stained-glass window to pay tribute to Lloyd-Davies was paid for by her family and installed at Ilston St Michael & All Angels Church in late 2012. Her name is inscribed in the Royal Society of Medicine's Virtual Roll of Honour.
