= Fabric of my Life =

Fabric of my Life or The Fabric of my Life may refer to:

- The fabric of my life : reflections of Helen Frances Gregor, 1987 autobiography of Helen Frances Gregor, Canadian textile artist
- Fabric of My Life, the Autobiography of Hannah G. Solomon, 1946 autobiography of Hannah G. Solomon, founder of the National Council of Jewish Women
- "The Fabric of My Life", song recorded by several artists as part of The Fabric of Our Lives advertising campaign for cotton
