= John Brogden (jeweller) =

British jeweller (1819–1884)

John Brogden (2 November 1819 – 16 October 1884) was a Victorian-era manufacturing jeweller.

Brogden was born in Islington, the son of Thomas and Ann Brogden. In 1834, he was apprenticed for seven years to a London firm of watch and clockmakers, under master James William Garland, with a workshop in Bridgewater Square. From 1842 to 1864, he was a partner in the firm of Watherston and Brogden (est. 1798), goldsmiths of 16 Henrietta Street, Covent Garden. In 1864 Brogden took over the business and operated under his own name until 1880. Between 1881 and 1885 he worked as an 'art goldsmith' at the Grand Hotel Buildings in Charing Cross.

Brogden was known for his jewelry in revivalist styles, including ancient Egyptian, Greek, and Renaissance designs. His work often featured intricate granulation and filigree techniques, enamel detailing, and gemstone accents. He employed several designers, but one of particular note was Charlotte Newman, who joined the firm in the mid-1860s.

Besides exhibiting jewellery at the 1851 Great Exhibition, Brogden won awards at various exhibitions in Paris and London from the 1850s to the 1870s. His designs were inspired by archaeological and Renaissance objects and he enjoyed royal patronage.

One of Brogden's notable works is a gold archaeological-style bracelet, created circa 1880, which is now part of the Victoria and Albert Museum's collection.

Brogden died in 1884 and was buried on the western side of Highgate Cemetery.

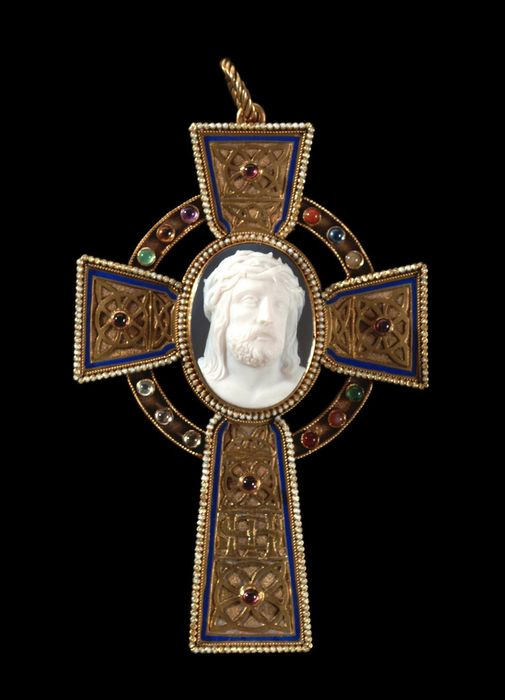
Gold cruciform pendant with a cameo of Christ's head wearing a crown of thorns, circa 1880, Birmingham Museum and Art Gallery

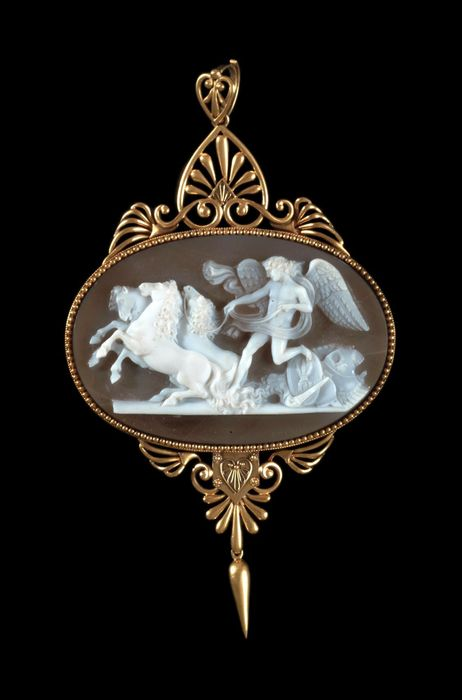
Phaethon cameo pendant set in a gold mount, circa 1880, Birmingham Museum and Art Gallery

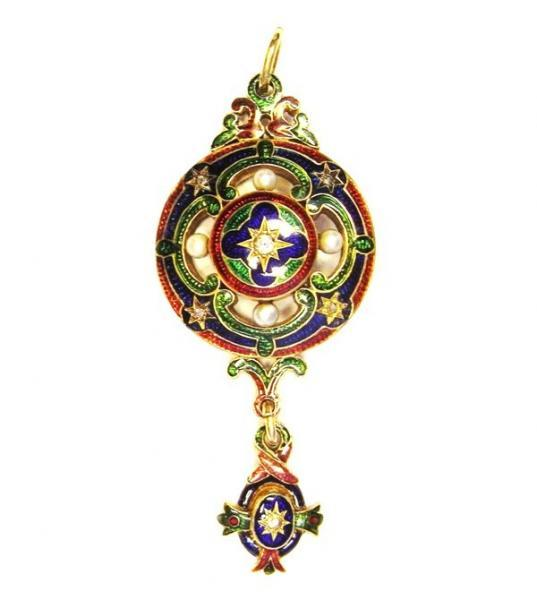
Holbeinesque pendant, circa 1870

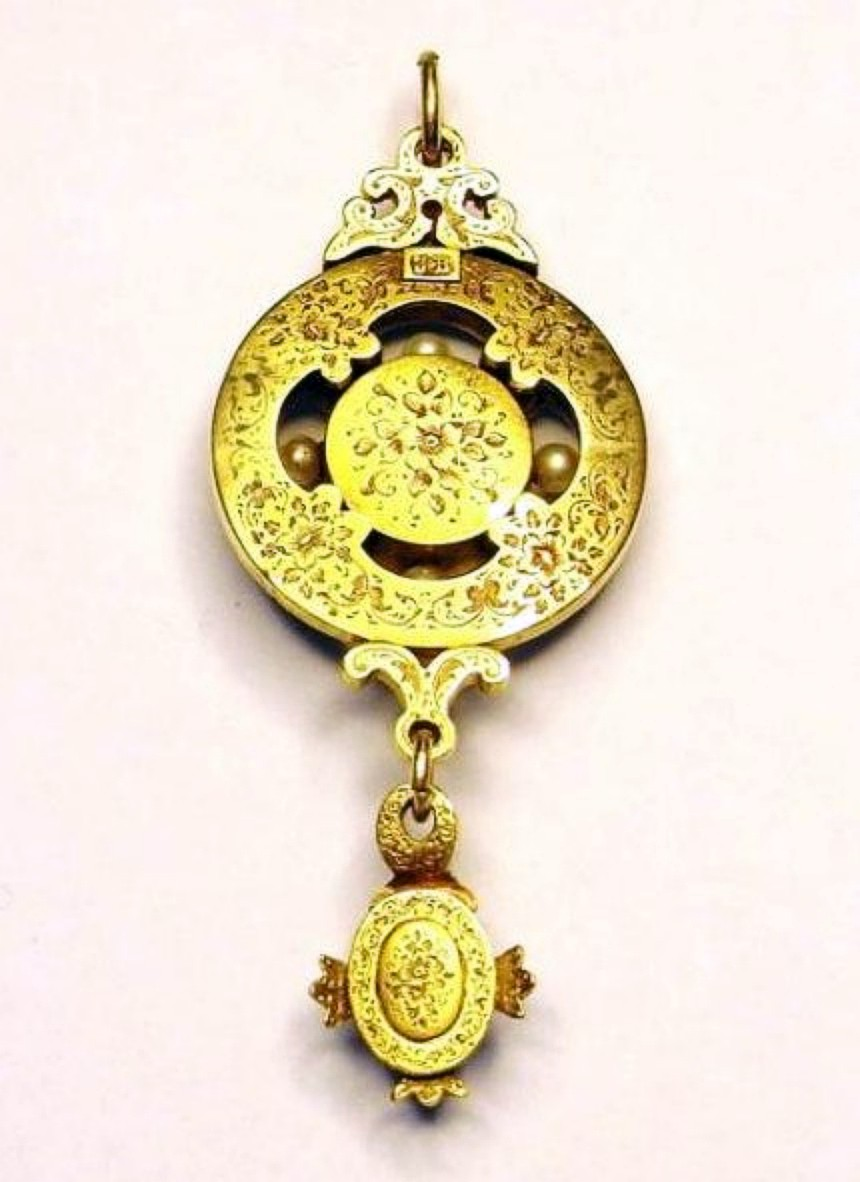
Reverse, with side initials "JB"

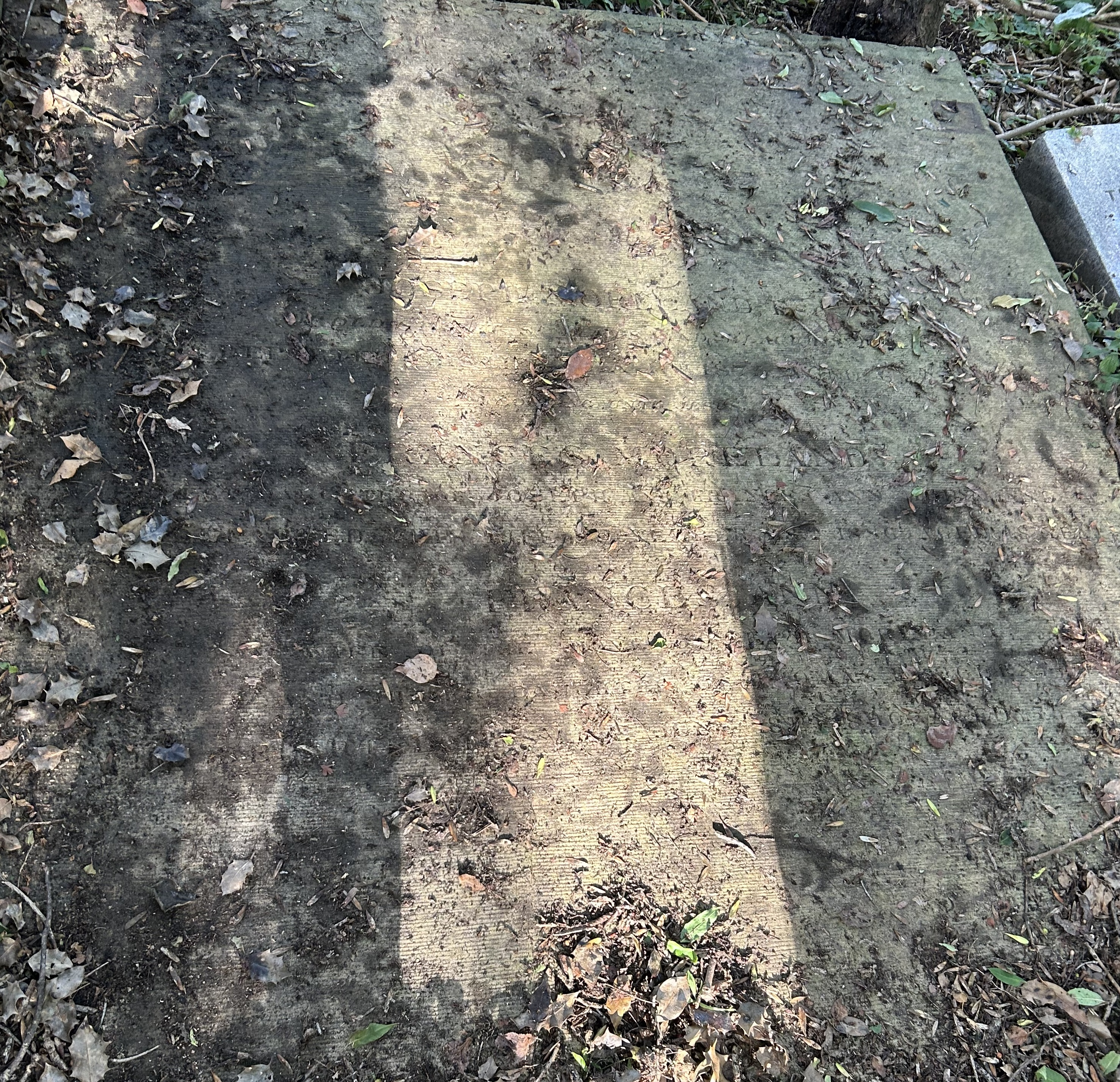
Grave of John Brogden in Highgate Cemetery
