= Holbeinesque jewellery =

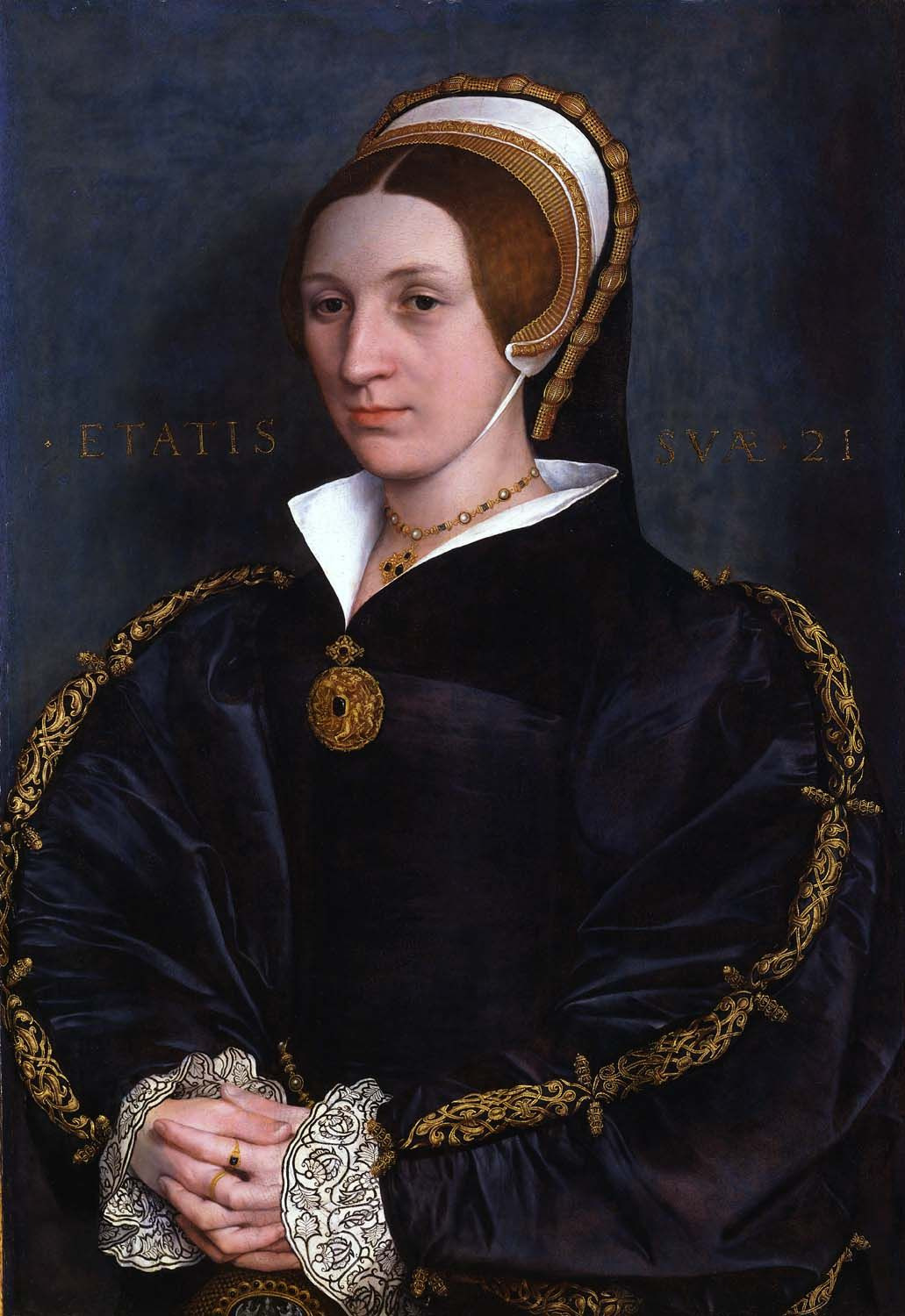
Portrait of Elizabeth Seymour by Hans Holbein the Younger

Holbeinesque jewellery includes pendants, brooches and earrings in the neo-Renaissance or Renaissance Revival style, and once again became fashionable in the 1860s. The designs differ from the older stylised and pious neo-Gothic jewellery, in that they are extravagantly opulent – this richness of form and colour which had appealed to the Tudor court was rediscovered by Victorian jewellers and their patrons, reviving a fashion that flourished into the early 1900s.

The style is characterised by a large, centrally-placed cabochon gemstone, cameo or intaglio mounted in gold and colourful enamel work, such as basse-taille, champlevé, cloisonné and en ronde bosse. Beneath this, a drop-shaped pearl or diamond-set lozenge was suspended. The back of each piece is often elaborately engraved using scroll and foliate ornamentation. Such designs were inspired by the art of Hans Holbein the Younger, and were often copied from jewellery depicted in Holbein's portraits of Tudor ladies from the court of Henry VIII by jewellers such as John Brogden and his fellow worker, Carlo Giuliano. Other jewellery houses producing Holbeinesque pieces, were those of Jules Wièse, Boucheron, Chaumet and Vever. Besides paintings of his sitters wearing their jewellery, Holbein also left detailed drawings of pieces, some copied from his sitters' pieces, some of his own design.

The motifs used came from classical mythology or from 16th-century Mannerist ornamentation, involving hybrid human/animal forms known as grotesques, torsos ending in columns or pedestals called terms, and chimeras. putti, quatrefoil and fantastic masks were often used for embellishment.

Holbeinesque jewellers could avail themselves of a vast range of reference sources for their designs. Many jewellery items survived from the Renaissance, books on design by artists of the 15th and 16th centuries, and court portraits of the rich and influential figures of the period by artists such as Raphael, Holbein and Cranach.

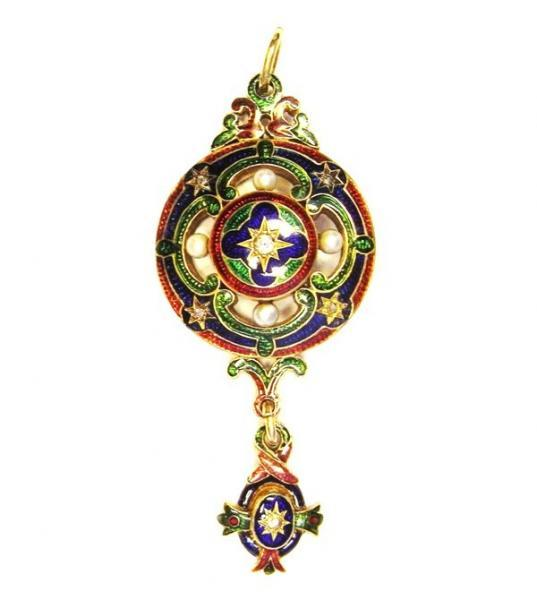
Holbeinesque pendant by John Brogden, circa 1870

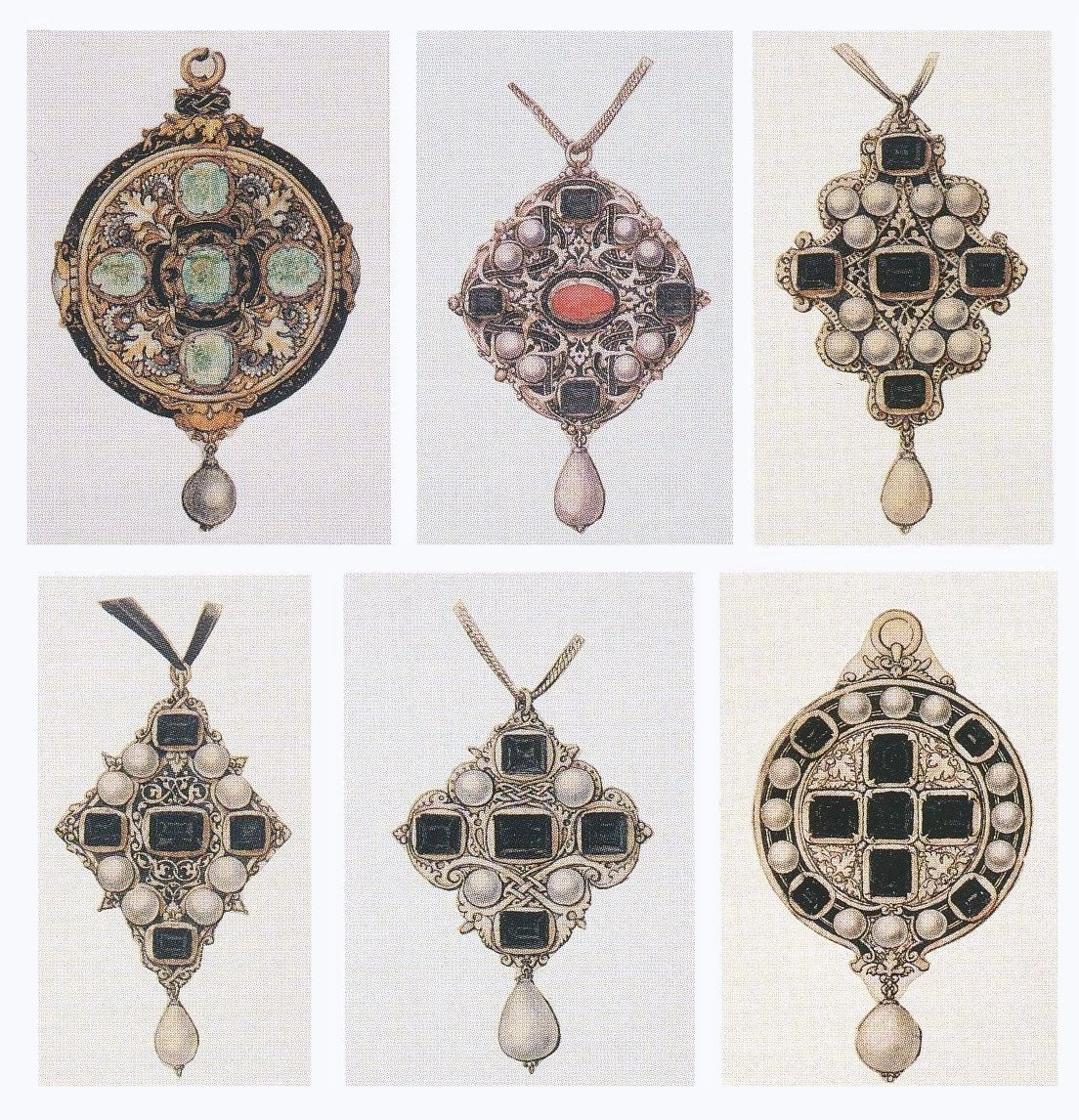
Six ink and wash designs for pendants by Hans Holbein the Younger, British Museum

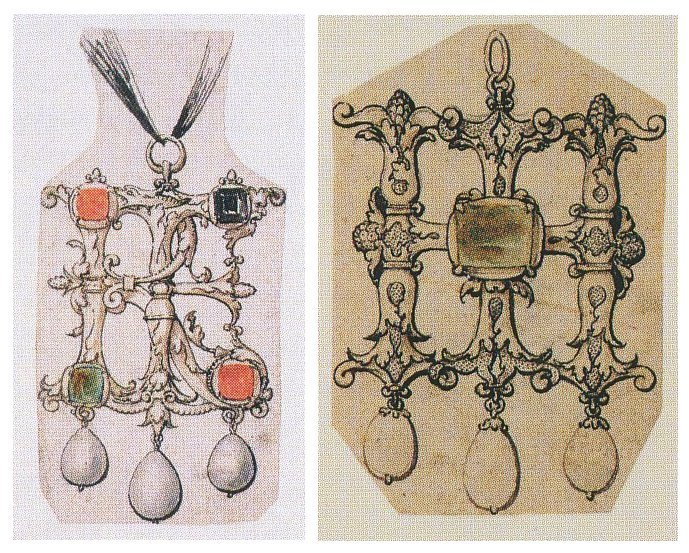
Two ink and watercolour designs for pendant jewelled initials by Hans Holbein the Younger, British Museum

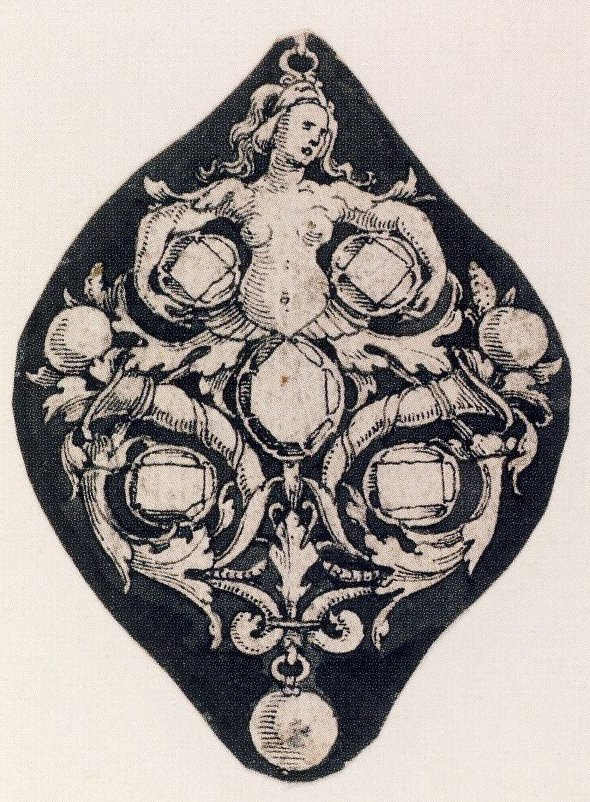
Pen and ink design for a pendant by Hans Holbein the Younger, British Museum
