= Frank Hinman =

American urologist (1915–2011)

Frank Hinman (2 October 1915 - 22 May 2011) was an American urologist, chief of the urology service at San Francisco General Hospital and the Children's Hospital, San Francisco. He performed some of the earliest studies on bladder epithelium, together with Reginald Wyndham Lloyd-Davies and in collaboration with the Donner Laboratory, University of California.

Dr. Hinman also performed gender affirming surgery for a trans patient who had performed an orchiectomy on herself in Aug 1953. The surgery with Dr. Hinman took place on 30 December 1953 at the University of California hospital. This patient of Dr. Hinman's, whom historian Annette F. Timm has provided the pseudonym Carla Erskine, soon became a patient of Dr. Harry Benjamin's, who spent summers in San Francisco. Timm notes that "according to Benjamin’s table of surgeries, compiled for The Transsexual Phenomenon, this appears to be the only such surgery that Hinman performed."
