= Reginald Wyndham Lloyd-Davies =

British urologist (1934–2023)

Reginald Wyndham Lloyd Davies
- Born: 24 June 1934; Wolverhampton, England
- Died: 25 March 2023 (aged 88)
- Education: St Thomas' Hospital
- Occupation: Surgeon
- Known for: Studies of the bladder epithelium
- Medical career
- Institutions: St Thomas' Hospital; King Edward VII's Hospital
- Sub-specialties: Urology
- Notable works: A Colour Atlas of Urology (co-authored in 1983)

Reginald Wyndham Lloyd-Davies (24 June 1934 – 25 March 2023) was a British urologist and head of clinical urology at St Thomas' Hospital, London, who completed early studies of the bladder epithelium with a scanning electron microscope.

Lloyd-Davies co-authored A Colour Atlas of Urology, first published in 1983.

== Early life and education ==
Wyndham Lloyd-Davies was born on 24 June 1934 in Wolverhampton, where he spent his childhood. He completed his early education from Rugby school, where he sustained a fracture of the tibia during a rugby game; the injury kept him confined for a year. In 1952, he gained admission to study medicine at St Thomas' Hospital. One of his early junior posts was at the Kent and Canterbury Hospital.

== Career ==
Upon returning to St Thomas' Lloyd-Davies assisted in setting up a dialysis unit. He gained a Master of Science degree after completing a year of research in San Francisco. There, in 1970 with Frank Hinman and in collaboration with the Donner Laboratory, University of California, he completed early studies of the bladder epithelium with a scanning electron microscope, comparing its appearance to the moon's surface. They photographed the surface of the bladder and urethra at a magnification of 30,000 times, and found it to be far from regular. They noted that the irregularity became exacerbated by infection, hindering washout. They found that the irregularities resolved with urethral and bladder distension.

Lloyd-Davies later became head of clinical urology at St Thomas' and was on the list of honorary medical staff at King Edward VII's Hospital.

Lloyd-Davies co-authored A Colour Atlas of Urology, first published in 1983. It contains images including those of pathological specimens, photographs of the bladder at endoscopy and diagrams that explain diagnostic procedures. 70 images relate to lesions of the penis and scrotum.

== Personal life and death ==
From his first marriage to Elizabeth he had two daughters; Vanessa Lloyd-Davies, a Major in the RAMC, and Fiona, a documentary film maker.

Lloyd-Davies died from metastatic pancreatic cancer on 25 March 2023, at the age of 88.

== Selected publications ==
=== Papers ===
- Lloyd-Davies, R. Wyndham; Lee, John C.; Hinman, Frank (1 July 1971). "Urothelial Micro-Contour. II. Intracellular Crypts and Secretory Substances". The Journal of Urology. 106 (1): 75–80. doi:10.1016/S0022-5347(17)61229-1. ISSN 0022-5347. PMID 4327620.
- Mayo, M. E.; Lloyd-Davies, R. W.; Shuttleworth, K. E.; Tighe, J. R. (April 1973). "The damaged human detrusor: functional and electron microscopic changes in disease". British Journal of Urology. 45 (2): 116–125. doi:10.1111/j.1464-410x.1973.tb12127.x. ISSN 0007-1331. PMID 706493.
- McFarkinson, I. R.; Eykyn, S. J.; Gardner, N. H. N.; Vanier, T. M.; Bennett, A. E.; Mayo, M. E.; Lloyd-Davies, R. W. (May 1973). "Bacteruria in pregnancy". British Journal of Obstetrics and Gynaecology. 80 (5): 385–405. doi:10.1111/j.1471-0528.1973.tb15952.x. PMID 4712935. S2CID 43841391.
- Lloyd-Davies, R. W.; Collins, C. D.; Swan, A. V. (August 1990). "Carcinoma of prostate treated by radical external beam radiotherapy using hypofractionation. Twenty-two years' experience (1962-1984)". Urology. 36 (2): 107–111. doi:10.1016/0090-4295(90)80207-4. ISSN 0090-4295. PMID 2385876.

=== Books ===
- A Colour Atlas of Urology. Wolfe Medical Publications. 1983. ISBN 978-0-7234-1607-4. (Co-authored)
