= A Colour Atlas of Urology =

- Author: Reginald Wyndham Lloyd-Davies, James G. Gow and D. R. Davies
- Language: English
- Publisher: Wolfe Medical Publications
- Publication date: 1983
- Pages: 287
- ISBN: 0-8151-5549-2

A Colour Atlas of Urology is a medical textbook of urology images first published by Wolfe Medical Publications in 1983. It is co-authored by Reginald Wyndham Lloyd-Davies, James G. Gow and D. R. Davies. 1,188 Images include those of pathological specimens, photographs at endoscopy of the bladder and diagrams that explain urological diagnostic procedures. 70 images relate to lesions of the penis and scrotum. A second edition was published in 1994.

A review in the Postgraduate Medical Journal noted that the X-ray of lung metastases was back to front. Another review considered it a complete work covering everything a urologist could possibly see in their profession. The British Journal of Venereal Diseases noted that the book was aimed at urologists but suggested that genitourinary physicians might be interested in it. All three reviews reported that the book was expensive.

== Publication ==
A Colour Atlas of Urology is co-authored by Reginald Wyndham Lloyd-Davies, James G. Gow and D. R. Davies, and was first published by Wolfe Medical Publications in 1983 at a cost of £48. A second edition, with co-author Helen Parkhouse, was published in 1994.

== Content ==
1,188 images include those of pathological specimens, photographs at endoscopy of the bladder and diagrams that explain urological diagnostic procedures. It contains a collection of X-rays including a comparison of spread to bone from prostate cancer and Paget's disease. 70 images relate to lesions of the penis and scrotum. These include priapism, spermatocele, and hydrocele.

== Reviews ==
J. P. Hopewell, in the Postgraduate Medical Journal, called the book "impressive and interesting" but noted that the X-ray of lung metastases was back to front and felt that improvement could have been made on the X-rays of polycystic kidney disease. W. Hendry, in the British Journal of Surgery, considered it a complete work covering everything a urologist could possibly see in their profession. A. McMillan, in the British Journal of Venereal Diseases noted that the book was aimed at urologists but suggested that genitourinary physicians might be interested in it. All three reviews reported that the book was expensive.
