= Eve Baker =

- Born: Eve Hirst; 29 July 1906
- Died: 18 August 1990 (aged 84)
- Education: Royal College of Art
- Occupations: Artist and conservator
- Organization: Eve Baker Trust (founder)
- Known for: Pioneering the use of authentic materials and techniques in the conservation of murals
- Spouse: Robert Baker

Eve Baker (née Hirst; 29 July 1906 – 18 August 1990) was a British artist and conservator. She was a leading conservator of mural paintings, pioneering the use of authentic materials and techniques.

== Personal life ==
Eve Hirst was born on 29 July 1906. She studied at the Royal College of Art, where she met the painter, ceramicist and sculptor Robert Baker, who would become her husband and collaborator. They had two children. The Bakers lived at South Newington, Oxfordshire, moving in the last years of Eve Baker's life to Woodgreen in the New Forest.

Eve Baker died on 18 August 1990.

== Career ==
Drawn to mural paintings, Baker went to Denmark to study under Egmont Lind. Lind's principle that the wall surfaces of ancient buildings needed to "breathe" led Baker, on her return to England, to challenge the traditional method of coating wall paintings in wax and similar substances, causing damage and darkening in the longer term. Building on Lind's instruction, her own experiments, and extensive reading, Baker's life became – in the words of The Times – "a campaign for the use of authentic materials and techniques". She was also strongly opposed to repainting or conjecturally completing historic paintings.

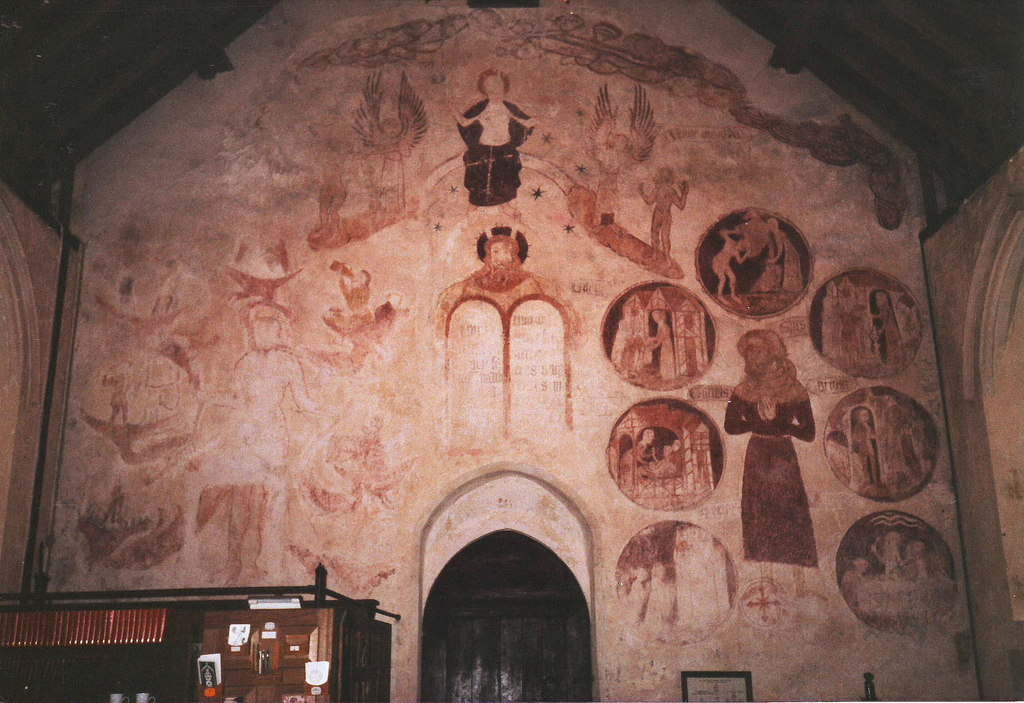
Medieval paintings at St. George's Church, Trotton

One of Baker's earliest major conservation projects was the Deadly Sins and Works of Mercy at Trotton in Sussex. Baker undertook significant work in cathedrals and parish churches across the UK. These included the cathedrals of Canterbury, Chichester, Durham, St Albans, Salisbury and Winchester. In Winchester, this included vital conservation in the 1950s and 1960s of the painted vault of the Guardian Angels' Chapel and the paintings of the Holy Sepulchre Chapel. At Wells Cathedral, Eve and Robert Baker conserved two figures on the west front, eventually leading to a programme of conservation encompassing all of this 13th-century sculpture.

Other major work included the 14th-century paintings in the chancel at Chalgrove, Oxfordshire, the Romanesque scheme at Kempley, Gloucestershire, and the 13th-century roundel in the Chapel of the Bishop's Palace at Chichester.

A "deep and inexhaustible love of these paintings" underpinned Baker's efforts to save works at risk. An example of this was her efforts at the church of Little Witchingham, Norfolk, where permission for demolition had been granted in 1950. Baker climbed through a broken window to investigate, ultimately revealing one of the country's finest schemes of 14th-century paintings.

During her lifetime, Baker was acknowledged as the country's foremost expert on the care and conservation of murals. She established the Eve Baker Trust to promote "The preservation and conservation of historic wall paintings, sculpture and other works of creative expression, as well as the advancement of education and research in these fields".

== Influence ==
On her death in 1990, Eve Baker was described as "one of the outstanding wall painting conservators of her generation", responsible for "much of our present knowledge and appreciation of English murals". That year, the Bakers had jointly received the Esher Award of the Society for the Protection of Ancient Buildings.

Baker's opposition to repainting and the use of modern conservation materials exerted significant influence in England, and she trained many among the next generation of conservators. She was remembered as "a formidable personality, and consequently not always easy to work with", but also, given "her deep commitment, integrity and often outstanding generosity", with "great affection by the conservation community".

The Building Limes Forum hold an annual Baker Memorial Lecture in memory of Robert and Eve Baker.
