= Charlotte Newman =

British goldsmith (1836–1920)

- Born: Charlotte Isabella Newman; 11 October 1836; Maddox Street, Mayfair, London
- Died: 18 January 1920 (aged 83)
- Occupations: Goldsmith and metalworker

Charlotte Isabella Newman (née Gibbs; 11 October 1836 – 18 January 1920), was a British goldsmith and metalworker who ran her own jewellery shop on Savile Row.

== Early life ==
Charlotte Isabella Gibbs was born at Maddox Street, Mayfair, London, on 11 October 1836.

At fourteen years old, she studied at the Government School of Design before studying in South Kensington. Sir Henry Cole encouraged her to become a designer; Newman said she developed her designer skills further when studying in Paris and in continental European museums.

She married a fellow artist, Philip Harry Newman, on 27 December 1860. They had two children.

== Designer work ==
After finishing her studies, Newman became a designer for the manufacturing jeweller John Brogden in Covent Garden. Her jewellery designs were all unique, inspired by many historical techniques and approaches which captivated many Victorian buyers – such as a bracelet designed from a Greek one found at Pompeii and a brooch copied from a Japanese antique. She then became the manager of Brodgen's shop, as he sought her designs for elite women customers such as Princess Louise.

Brogden and Newman were part of the world's fair expositions in Paris (1867 and 1878). In 1878, Newman was awarded the Médaille d'honneur as a collaboratrice; Brogden was awarded the Légion d'Honneur.

Newman started her own jewellery business when Brogden died, using his workers, staff, models and references. It was based near Bond Street and was called "Mrs Newmans". It was very popular and quickly attracted the interest of art journals, newspapers, and women's presses. In 1893 she exhibited several pieces at the Chicago World's Fair. In 1899, the French government commissioned her to design twelve gold medallions for Maria Feodorovna, the Empress of Russia. Her buyers at this time were described by the English press as "grand dames".

In 1897, the business was moved to 10 Savile Row, where Newman worked at the heart of the men's tailoring district, where she was known as "Mrs Philip Newman" and answered to her husband's name. She was not seen as a commercial jeweller, in line with many in the arts and crafts movement at the time, and her shopfronts were deliberately and conspicuously bare and sparse; she said this was to prevent her designs from being copied by competitors. She employed male apprentices with long-standing family connections to jewellery.

She was contemporaneously portrayed as the leading "lady goldsmith" in London; however, she was often barred from taking part in artistic organisations because she was a woman. In 1884, she gave a lecture to the Royal Society of Arts on the art of goldsmithing, and discussed jewellery at the 1899 International Congress of Women, as well as joining the Women's Guild of Arts. She also sat on the committee of the Arts and Crafts Board at the Lyceum Club.

== Death and legacy ==
Newman died in St Pancras on 18 January 1920. "The Brogden Album" at the V&A contains a number of designs with her signature.
