= Cherry Potter =

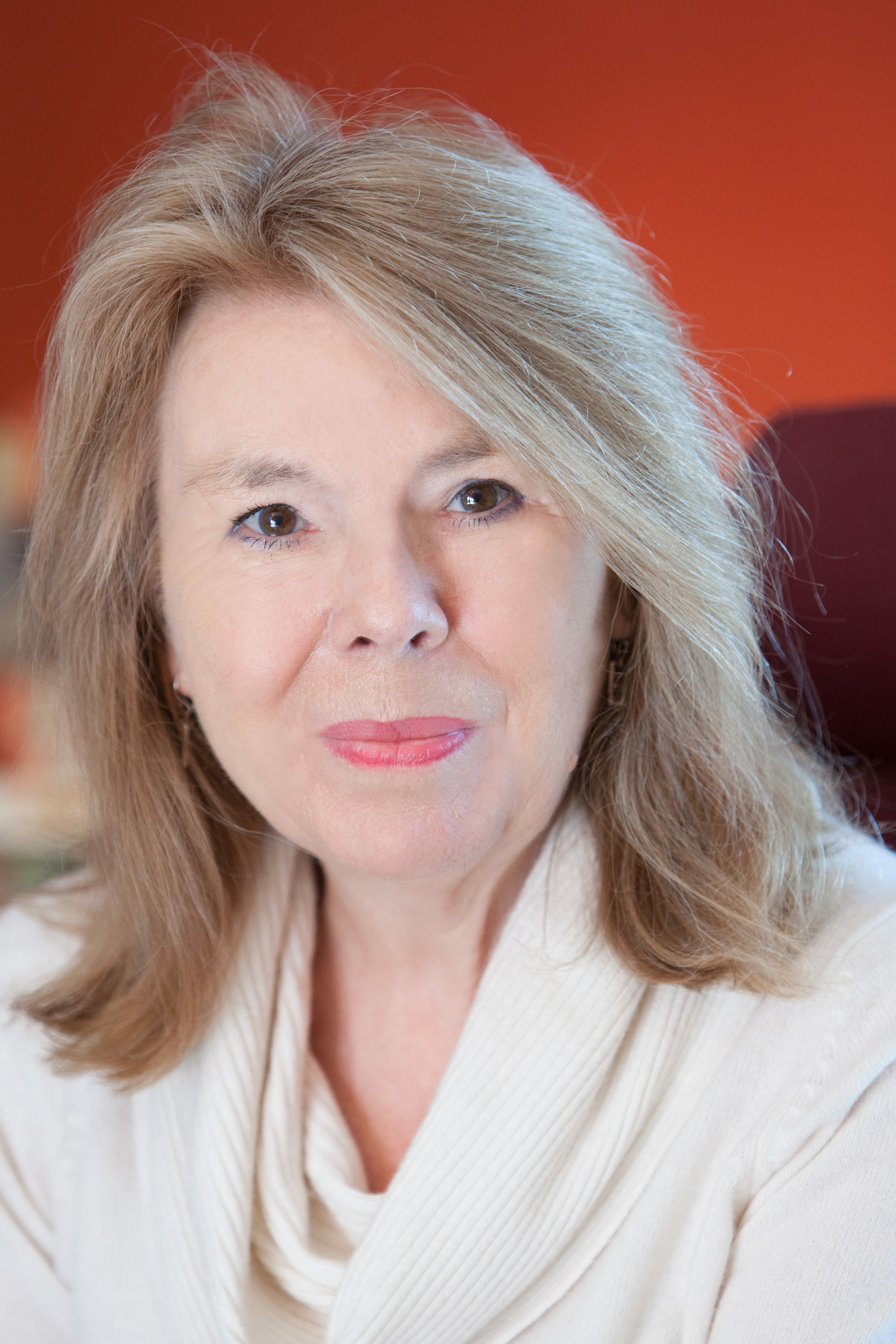
Potter in 2015

Cherry Potter is a film writer, cultural commentator and psychotherapist.

She is the author of three film books:

- Image, Sound and Story, the art of telling in film (Secker and Warburg, 1990), ISBN 978-0436380341
- Screen Language: From writing to film making (Methuen, 2001), ISBN 978-0413752901
- I Love You But…Seven Decades of Romantic Comedy (Methuen, 2002), ISBN 978-0413749901

She also writes on film, culture and relationships for The Guardian.
