= Sophie Harley =

British jewellery designer

- Education: Royal College of Art
- Occupation: Jewelry designer
- Years active: 1990 - Present
- Known for: Designing jewelry for James Bond films
- Website: www.sophieharley.com

Sophie Harley is a British jewelry designer who is best known for designing the Algerian Love Knot necklace and earrings, which were featured in the James Bond film Casino Royale.

== Background and Career ==
Harley obtained an MA in 'goldsmithing and jewellery design' from London's Royal College of Art in 1989. She went on to create her jewelry commission business Bespoke.

In 2002 Harley was commissioned by DeBeers to create a brooch to be awarded to the trainer of the winning horse in the King George VI and Queen Elizabeth Diamond Day stakes at Royal Ascot by Queen Elizabeth II. She has produced jewellery for the James Bond films Casino Royale and Quantum of Solace. In 2013 Sophie Harley won 'UK Jewellery Designer of the Year'.

As of 2025, Harley's team consists of seven women designers, makers, jewelers, specialists, and managers.

== Style ==
Harley's jewelry commonly incorporates "ancient and philosophical symbols with her signature winged heart symbol of love, hope and liberation." Her Algerian Love Knot style of Jewelry has become a staple of her designs, with many collections dedicated to the style. She is also known to rely entirely on precious stones and metals including nine and eighteen carat white and yellow gold, and various colorful gemstones for her designs.

== Collectors ==
Clients include Kate Beckinsale, Naomi Campbell, Judi Dench, Colin Firth, Jerry Hall, and Joss Stone.
