= Janice Wainwright (fashion designer) =

British fashion designer (1940–2023)

Janice Wainwright (2 December 1940 – 3 June 2023) was a British fashion designer. She was known for creating glamorous bias-cut and tailored pieces using high quality fabrics featuring intricate embroidery and applique and ran her own successful fashion label from 1972 to 1990.

== Beginnings, education and early career ==
Janice Wainwright was born in Doe Lea, near Chesterfield, Derbyshire and grew up in Wimbledon, London.

Wainwright studied at the Wimbledon School of Art and Kingston School of Art before gaining a place at the Royal College of Art Fashion School in London in 1961. She studied under Janey Ironside and was part of a new wave of British fashion talent emerging from the College in the 1960s. Her contemporaries included Ossie Clarke, Zandra Rhodes, Moya Bowler, Bill Gibb, Marion Foale and Sally Tuffin.

== Simon Massey ==
In 1965, London fashion house Simon Massey head hunted Wainwright straight from the RCA to be their chief designer.

She became well known for using African prints and The Scotsman declared her as the "African prints queen". Writing in the Telegraph in 1967 Serena Sinclair wrote: "I tip as the sensation of 1967: the African look... Here it took a slender, shy young blonde designer Janice Wainwright to cut and drape and fashion these prints into dresses of logic and beauty [...] She's chosen surprise colourways - to everyone who thinks of jungle prints as blazes of red and bronze and yellow - such as a rich forest green teamed with a grape-juice red.”

Another collection in 1968 was inspired by Isadora Duncan, described as "twenties inspired – clinging crepe and exotic with swatched turbaned headgear floating dresses and scarves".

She introduced the trouser suit for women, which were considered outlandish at the time. In the late 1960s, a newspaper set up a photo shoot whereby Wainwright, wearing a trouser suit she designed, tried to gain entry to some of London’s classiest hotels where trouser suits went against the dress code.

Wainwright was one of only a few designers permitted to use Celia Birtwell's printed textiles in the 1960s.

In 1967 the Daily Express published an article about "convertibles" and claimed "the idea comes from bright designer Janice Wainwright at Simon Massey, London" when she created a maxi skirt which becomes a mini skirt and also a cloak - “first it was the mini, then the maxi, and now…the multi…!" The Sunday Mirror also reported that Simon Massey, with "Janice Wainwright, their clever young designer", had found a "cure" for "fashion schizophrenia" in creating convertibles.

Wainwright continued designing for Simon Massey under the name "Janice Wainwright at Simon Massey" until 1971.

== Janice Wainwright label ==
From the early 1970s, with a free rein, she began a creative period of freelancing which developed the Wainwright label. In 1974 Janice was able to buy out her original investors and traded under her own name. She expanded her company in a new premises in Poland Street, Soho, and, with her sister Wendy as head of sales, a new era of creative and global business success began. Her collections were sold in London stores Harrods, Harvey Nichols and Selfridges, Chic of Hampstead and boutiques all over Britain. In the United States her lines were carried in Bergdorf Goodman (where her collection filled all the Fifth Avenue windows of the building), Henri Bendel, Saks Fifth Avenue, Bloomingdales, Neiman Marcus and Nordstrom in Seattle and Canada, Seibu in Japan, Joyce Boutique Hong Kong and Georges in Sydney.

In the early 1970s, she also acted as a Visiting Lecturer for the Royal College of Art.

In the 1980s the Janice Wainwright brand remained popular with the fashion press. In 1981 The Sunday Telegraph referred to Janice as "one of London's most successful designers".

The Fashion Museum, Bath holds several pieces of her work, and the Victoria and Albert Museum also holds three of her pieces in its permanent collection.

In 2019 Kate Moss attended Marc Jacob's wedding wearing vintage Janice Wainwright.

== Personal life ==
In 1967, Wainwright married photographer David Cripps MBE, and they had a son in 1970.

In 1990, Wainwright retired from fashion. In 2003 she moved to Sydney, Australia where she was married to architect and painter Rollin Schlicht until his death in 2011.

Wainwright returned to the UK in 2017, living in Canterbury where she died on 3 June 2023, at the age of 82.
