= Walter Smith (art educator) =

British art educator and author

Walter Smith (1836–1886) was a British art educator and author of drawing books and books on industrial art education, known as leading early proponent of industrial design in the United States.

== Early life and education ==
Smith was born in Britain in 1836, and graduated at the South Kensington School of Art in London. After graduation, Smith settled in Leeds, where he became headmaster of the Leeds, Holbeck and Keighley School of Art. He also became headmaster of the drawing department of the Leeds Grammar School; Principal Art Master in Huddersfield College in Huddersfield, and superintendent of drawing in schools for the poor in the district of Leeds, Huddersfield, Keighley etc.

== Career ==
In the early 1860s, he was commissioned by the British Lords of the Committee of Council on Education Smith made a comparison of the French and English systems of art education to suggest improvement and modification of the latter. This resulted in the 1864 publication of Report on the works of pupils, in the French schools of design, recently exhibited in the Palais de l'Industrie, Champs-Elysées, Paris.

At the age of thirty-five, in 1871, he emigrated to the United States. In Boston, he became appointed Professor of Art Education in the City of Massachusetts Normal School of Art, and Massachusetts State director of Art Education. The City of Boston later also appointed him director of drawing for the city, where he had the responsibility to provide art instruction and supervision to classroom teachers in the city of Boston. In his years in the States, he wrote a series of books on art education, and instructional works for teachers, and a drawing book for students of public schools and art schools. He also wrote a work on the Decorative arts, shown at the Centennial Exhibition in 1876 in Philadelphia.

In the late 1870s, he gave a series of lectures to the Massachusetts Teachers Association and other National Associations on Art and technical education, which were later published. In 1882 he returned to England, where he died in four years later.

Smith published American textbooks of art education, in the early 1870s, which influenced American art education. He developed an elementary curriculum of drawing for Massachusetts public schools, which would "set the standard for art education throughout the Northeast."

Another of Smith's accomplishments was a drawing technique, "based on a drawing technique developed by the English designer Christopher Dresser, his method emphasized regular ornament consisting of simple geometrical forms arranged symmetrically."

Smith wrote one of the first American textbooks of art education, published in 1873. In the preface he declared, that the intention of the work was to cover the whole field of art education:

The plan of the books is the first systematic effort made in this country to cover the whole field of Art Education for schools, by embracing every subject included under the head of Elementary Drawing. Pupils going through the course in all the subjects will be thoroughly grounded and prepared either for practical industrial art or the further professional study of the fine arts.

Smith was an early proponent of industrial design. In his 1880 American Text-books of Art Education: Drawing-books 1 and 2, he predicted their importance, stating:

The subject of industrial design is one of three important practical co-related subjects which should be taught in public schools, and to which practice and skill in drawing should be applied. Satisfactory results in this subject, however, depend entirely upon the manner in which it is taught. Instruction in industrial design means a clear presentation of the principles which obtain in the construction and harmonious arrangement of geometric form for decorative purposes, the proper use of plant forms in ornamental arrangements, and the principles of good taste to be found in the great history styles of art.

Smith supported education for women in the fields of art and design, in order that they may be able to become educators in these fields. In light of the Victorian emphasis on having a profitable occupation, Smith promoted women in art education by pointing out that this would utilize those whose lives were not at that point profitably engaged. He also advocated for design careers for women and hoped that new American art schools would not be involved in gender bias.

- 1864. Report on the works of pupils, in the French schools of design, recently exhibited in the Palais de l'Industrie, Champs-Elysées, Paris : with a comparison of the French and English systems of art education, and suggestions for the improvement and modification of the latter: as presented to the Secretrary of the Science and Art Department, by order of the Lords of the Committee of Council on Education
- 1872. Art education, scholastic and industrial
- 1872. The teaching of drawing and use of blackboard illustrations
- 1873. American text books of art education : Geometrical drawing 2nd ed. 1875.
- 1874. Drawing in public schools : the system of instruction
- 1875. Examples of household taste : The industrial art of the International Exhibition
- 1874. Teachers' manual for freehand drawing in primary schools
- 1876. Teachers' manual for freehand drawing in Intermediate schools : intended to accompany the drawing-books for intermediate schools
- 1879. Industrial education, and drawing as its basis: address delivered at the annual meeting of the Massachusetts Teachers Association, at Worcester, Dec. 28, 1878]
- 1879. Technical education and industrial drawing. Paper read at the annual meeting of the National Educational Association in the Department of State Superintendents of Public Schools, held at Washington, February 5, 1879]
- 1882. Popular industrial art education : the answer to a question
- 1883. Technical education and industrial drawing in public schools [microform] : reports and notes of addresses delivered at Montreal and Quebec
- 1882. Popular industrial art education. The answer to a question, "The Pennsylvania Museum and School of Industrial Art, Philadelphia, Penn.: How can this institution best promote the cause of popular industrial art education?"
- 1882. Lectures upon drawing in the three grades of primary, grammar, and high schools of the city of Boston; addressed to the teachers of the several grades
