= Audrey Levy =

British artist and textile designer (born 1928)

Audrey Levy (born 1928) is a British artist and textile designer.

Levy was born in the city of Nottingham, England. She studied textiles at a young age and graduated from the Royal College of Art. She received the Council of Industrial Design's (CoID) ‘Design of the Year’ award twice, the first time for a screen painted wallpaper she did for The Wall Paper Manufacturers Ltd (WPM), and a year later for the design ‘Phantom Rose’ for the Palladio Scheme. She also contributed to Palladio with her skeletal leaf pattern. For Palladio 3 she created murals such as Maze and Treescape, as well as smaller, textual patterns such as Pebble.

She also designed a pattern for T G Green & Co. Ltd in 1959, a pottery company. She helped judge the Design Centre Awards in 1964 together with, journalist Katherine Whitehorn, architect and designer Neville Ward, and George Williams, Chief Executive of the British Railways Design Panel. She was a Fellow of the Society of Industrial Artists and Designers. Her work is displayed as a permanent collection at the Whitworth Art Gallery. The Museum of Domestic Design and Architecture also holds a number of examples of her wallpapers.
