= Marilene Oliver =

British printmaker and sculptor

Marilene Julie Oliver (born 1977) is a British printmaker and sculptor.

Marilene Oliver gained a BA in Fine Art Printmaking and Photomedia at Central Saint Martins College of Art and Design and an MA and MPhil in Fine Art Printmaking at the Royal College of Art, both in London.

Her research at the RCA involved scanning the human body. She has produced unusual sculptures based on live human bodies using the scanning technologies of computed tomography (CT), magnetic resonance imaging (MRI) and positron emission tomography (PET), normally used for medical reasons.

Oliver has exhibited her work in Gifu (Japan), Berlin (Germany) and at Beaux Arts London in Cork Street, London (England), in 2003, 2006 and 2007. Marilene Oliver's work can be seen in the Victoria and Albert Museum Print Room. It is also in the Wellcome Trust collection.

Since 2016, Oliver has been employed as assistant professor in Printmaking at the University of Alberta in Edmonton, Alberta, Canada.

== Artworks ==
- I Know You Inside Out (2001)
- Family Portrait (2003)
- Text Me (2003)
- Sleeping Beauty (2004)
- Radiant (2005)
- Exhausted Figure (2006)
- Dervishes (2007)
- Heart Axis (2007)
- Dreamcatcher (2009)
- Orixa (2010)
- Split Petcetrix (2010)
- Dugout (2014)
