= Peter Jacob Maltz =

Israeli artist (born 1973)

Peter Jacob Maltz פיטר יעקב מלץ
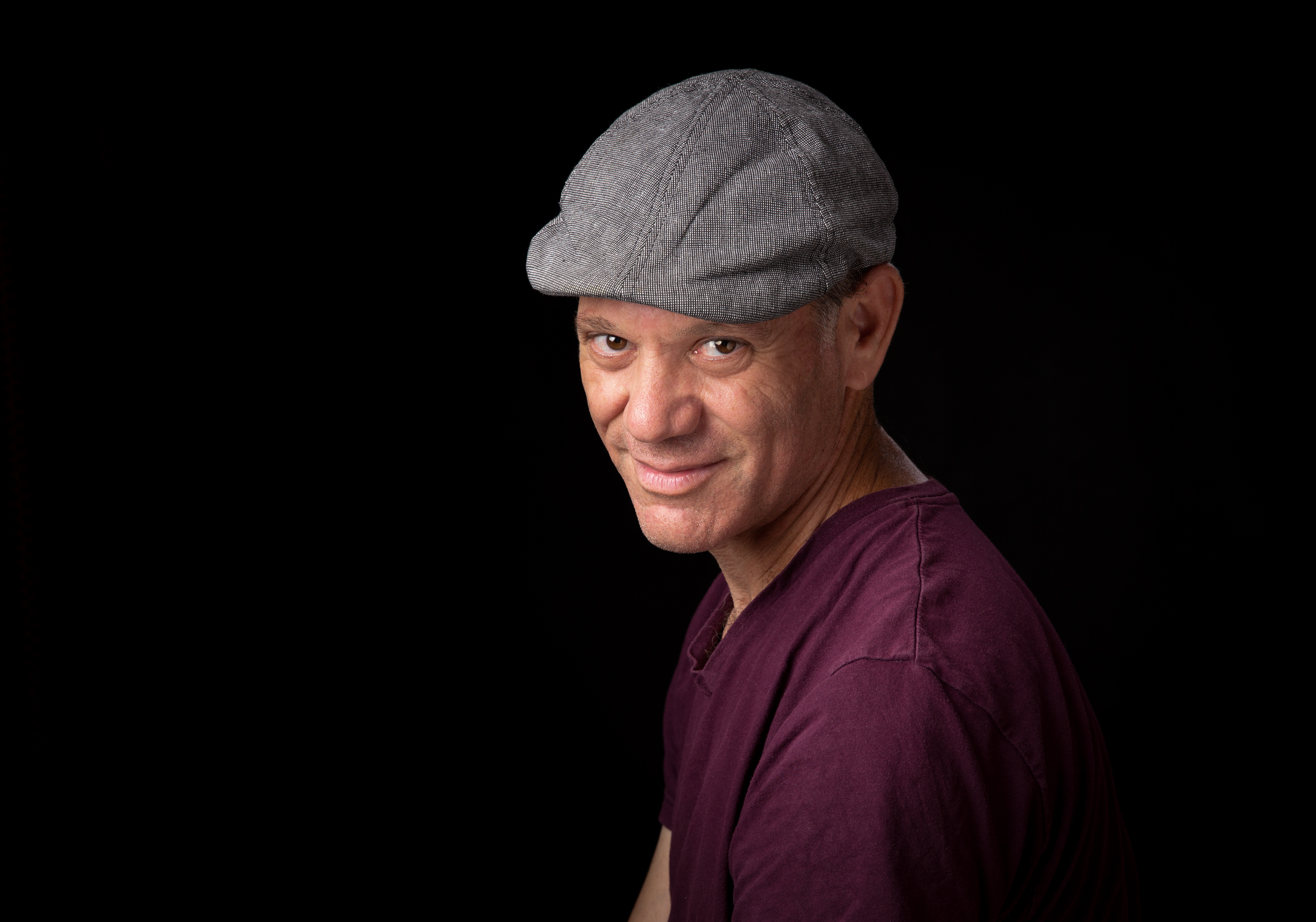
- Peter Jacob Maltz
- Born: 1973 (age 52–53); England
- Education: Royal College of Art
- Known for: Sculpture
- Movement: Israeli art

Peter Jacob Maltz (Hebrew: פיטר יעקב מלץ; born 26 June 1973) is an Israeli artist born in England. Maltz combines in his works of art, abstract and narrated motifs. His work deals with documentation of humanistic, theological, and political aspects in the day to day.

== Biography ==
Peter Jacob Maltz was born on 1973 in London, the son of Stephen and Susan Maltz. In 1977, he immigrated to Israel with his family. He was raised in Ramat Hasharon in a Traditional and English-speaking family. Since his childhood Maltz was intrigued with aspects of Identity, Religion and Faith. Those aspects found their way to his artistic work.

As a teenager, Maltz studied art in "Alon" high school at Ramat Hasharon. His experiences as young man had an influence on his artistic path. Those experiences included his army service and his younger brother's death. Before his BFA studies Maltz learnt stone carving in south India and grew closer to Buddhism. He studied art at Bezalel art Academy in Jerusalem and was influenced by artists such as Larry Abramson, Nahum Tevet and Pesach Slabosky.

While establishing a personal visual language during his studies, Maltz studied art education, researched the implications of the Post-Modern era, Strategies of documentation and worked as an exhibition producer at the Israel museum.

In 2002 Maltz held his first Solo exhibition at the Artist's Studios in Tel Aviv. The foundations of his artists characteristics can be recognized from this exhibition. Use of variety Artistic styles, Bridging the personal with the communal, using art as a form of documentation, Drawing inspiration from Religious subjects and Literature and using irony and humor as means to convey complex messages.

In 2005 Maltz completed his master's degree in sculpture at the Royal College of Art, London. At the graduation show he exhibited a large relief and a series of drawings. This exhibition set the foundations of an ongoing preoccupation with reliefs that aspire to bridge the physical space to metaphysical sensations. It was also the basis of creating series of drawings to depict an allegorical narrative. From this year on, Maltz perceives his creative activity as a holistic documentary project. A sequence of moments that create a single chronicle.

In 2006 he began his social activity. He created artistic projects with children in Jaffa and Ofakim. In 2011, Maltz published the book "Roots", in it appeared ink drawing that accompanied the text. The book tells the story of David, a lecturer at Bezalel Academy of Art and Design in Jerusalem. David descends from Jerusalem towards Tel Aviv after his day of work. His car breaks down near the village of Shoresh. While he waits for the towing, he decides to climb Mount Shoresh, where he meets the figure of Jacob. Jacob preaches his views on faith and existence to David and tells him that he was educated as a "New Essenes". Following this encounter, David undergoes a change and returns to his life.

The drawings in the books were inspired by the works of Ephraim Moshe Lilien that were combined with photographs taken by Maltz in Jerusalem and in the "Sha'ar Hagai" valley. This book is an interim summary and culmination of Maltz's work on the topic of Allegorical journey's. In the book ideas relating to his personal life, religious Fundamentalism, faith and art, New Age, Jerusalem and neo-Zionism were intertwined.

In January 2012 he created the project "Undercurrent". Maltz created a drawing a day and uploaded it to Facebook. The drawings responded to his personal life, to the Israeli art field and to the Israeli reality. The drawings were exhibited at Kibbutz Gallery in 2013.

In 2015, Maltz created a large-sized relief, "One Day Passes and Another Day Comes", which is exhibited at the Israel Museum. For the preparation of the relief, Maltz went on a ten-day journey from his home in Kadima to the specified exhibition wall at the Israel Museum. On his way, he created multiple imprints of textures and objects using clay from which he prepared casts. After the journey he connected all the casts to sixteen panels which were then hung on a wall to create one work. The work depicts a road map and a compression of the journey that occurred over space and time to one place and time – the wall in the museum.

== Gallery ==
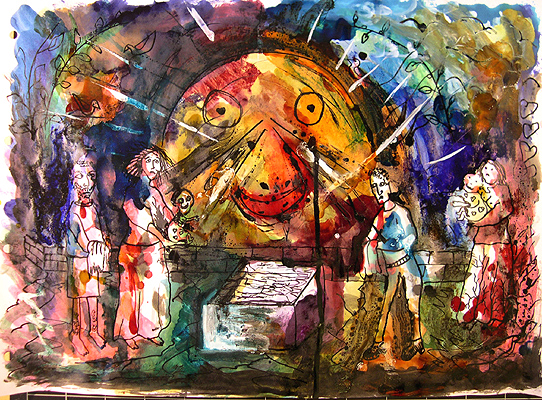
Trial 2004, Ink and Glass paint on paper

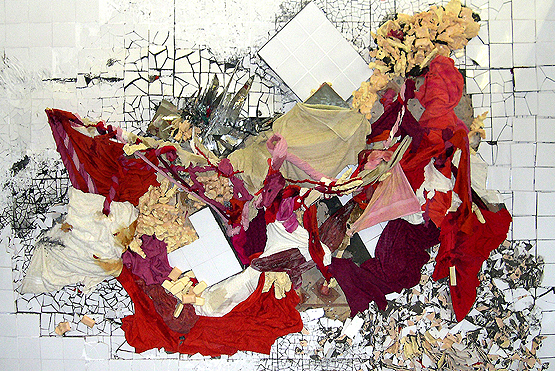
Lying in the bath and thinking of the massacre of the innocent, 2005, Tiles, mirrors, cement, towels and soap. The Reynolds Foundation collection. London

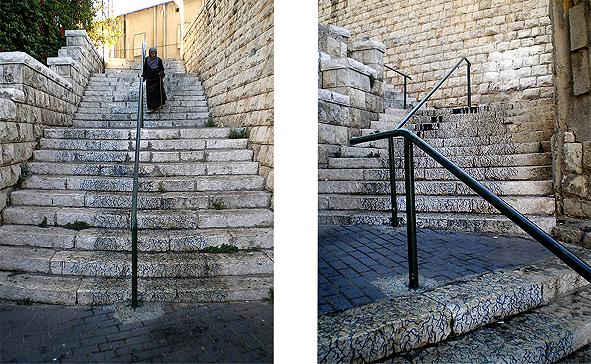
From Here to There, 2010, Oil on steps, Wadi Nisnas, Haifa

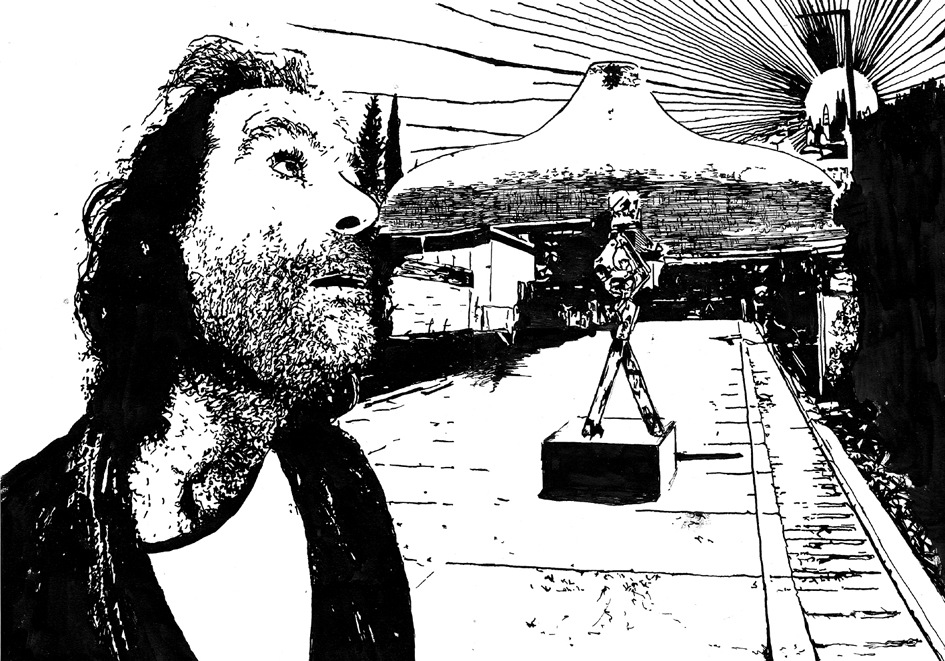
Drawing, from artist book, 2011. Israel museum collection, Jerusalem

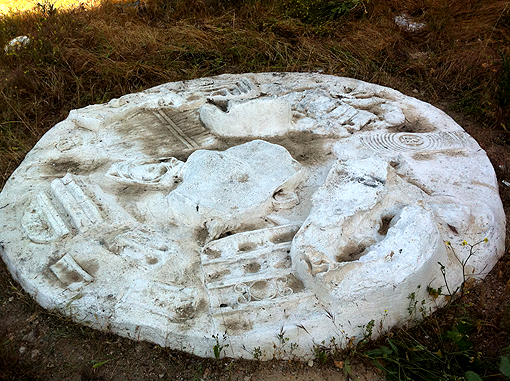
The Meeting point, 2011, Cement, Musrara, Jerusalem

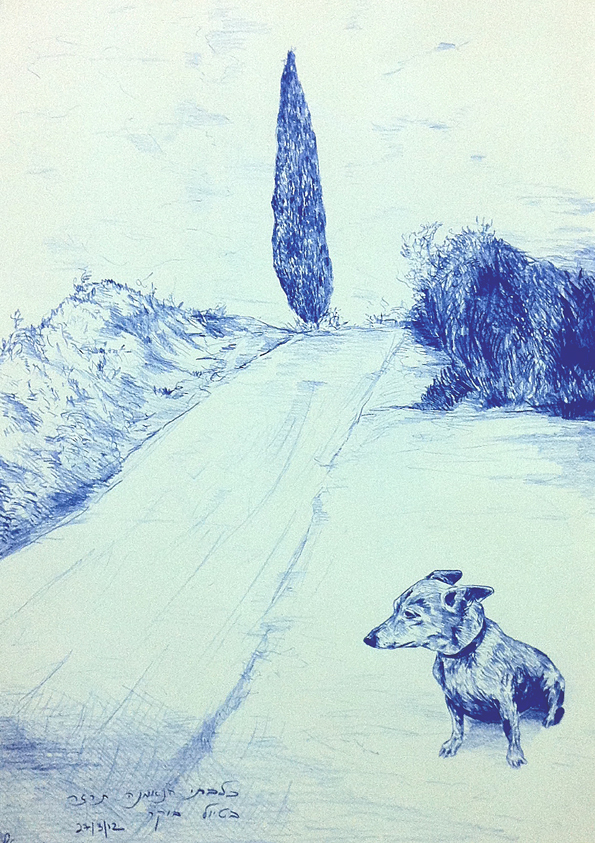
27.3, Morning walk with the dog, 2012, Coloured pencil on paper

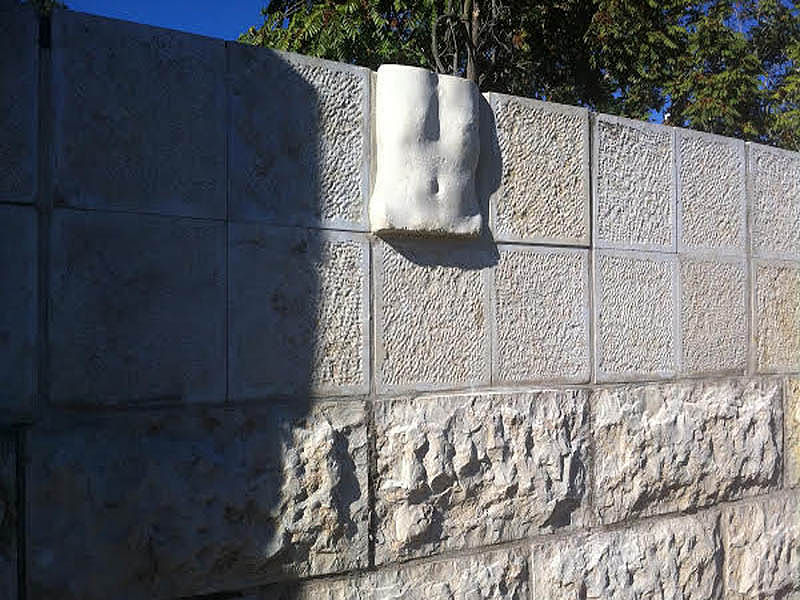
Omphalos, Cement, Jerusalem

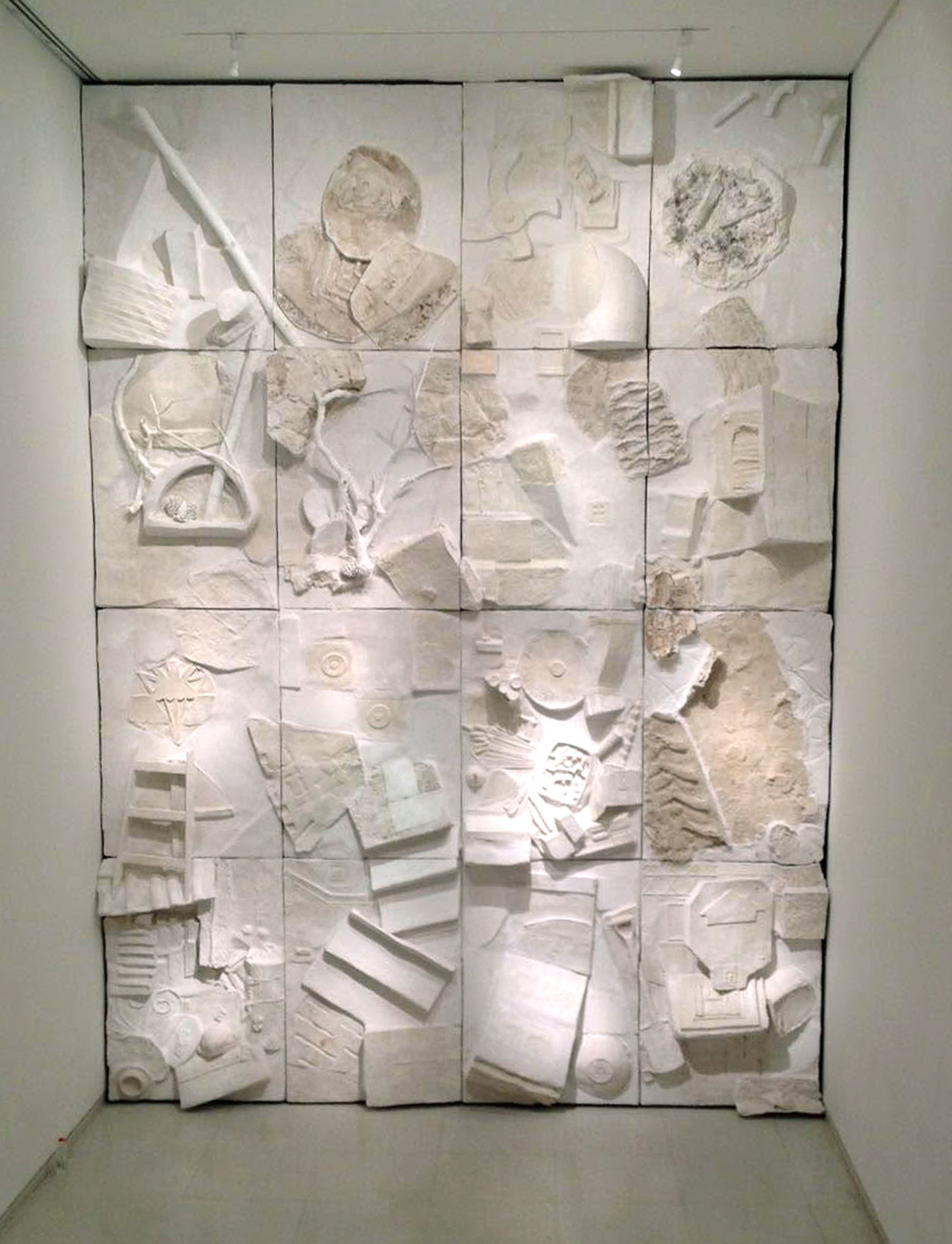
One day passes and another day comes, 2015, The Israel museum collection, Jerusalem

== Education ==
1997–2001 BFA cum laude, Bezalel, art and design academy, Jerusalem

1999–2001 Teaching certificate, Kerem Institute, Jerusalem

2003–2005 MFA Sculpture, Royal College of Art, London

2011 Meditation instructor certificate, Wingate Institute

== Teaching ==
From 2005 tutor at the art department, Bezalel, Academy of art and design, Jerusalem

2006–2008 The Architecture faculty, Technion, Haifa

2007–2012 Minshar, Art college, Tel Aviv

Since 2019, Head of Fine Arts department, Thelma-Yellin National School of Arts

== Scholarships and Prizes ==
2001 Excellence prize for undergraduate, Art department, Bezalel

2001 Excellence prize for student, Wolf foundation

2002 Sharet scholarship, America-Israel foundation

2003 Excellence scholarship for studies abroad, America -Israel foundation

2004 Excellence scholarship for International student, Royal college of art

2005 Young artist prize, Education Culture and Sports ministry

2006 Teacher-Artist scholarship, Education Culture and Sports ministry

2010 Community artist scholarship, Culture and Sports ministry

2015 Support scholarship for an exhibition, the Pais lottery council

2017 Visual art prize, The Meiron Sima foundation

2019 Culture Minister prize, Culture and Sports ministry
