= Valerie Wiffen =

British artist

Valerie Wiffen ARCA (born 1943) is a London-based British artist who is best known for her portraiture.

== Biography ==
Wiffen was born in Danbury, Essex in 1943 and received her art education and training at South West Essex Technical College and School of Art, and then the Royal College of Art Painting School, London, where she studied under Sandra Blow, Jean Bratby, Mary Fedden, Ruskin Spear, Carel Weight, Peter Blake and Ken Howard. Wiffen won the Royal College of Art Drawing Prize in 1966 on her graduation. She is an ARCA (an associate of the Royal College of Art).

Wiffen's notable portrait commissions include The Duke of Edinburgh which is in the collection of the Board of Deputies and Dr Carey, when he was Archbishop of Canterbury, with Mrs Carey. She has work in various public collections such as her portraits of Sir Sigmund Sternberg (1998) which is in the National Portrait Gallery; Sir Gavyn Arthur as Lord Mayor of London which is in the Guildhall Art Gallery; Margaret Beckett MP, a presentation from the Jain community; the High Commissioner for India Dr LM Singhvi, in the collection of the Bhavan Centre for Indian Music; and her portrait of Rabbi Dr Louis Jacobs is in the Jewish Museum, London.

== Solo exhibitions ==
- 1992 Animal, Vegetable and Mineral, West Dean College Gallery, Sussex, UK
- 2013 Treasures From The Museums & Collections of London, The Broadway Bookshop, London
- 2015 Open Spaces & Public Places: An Exhibition of Drawings & Paintings by Valerie Wiffen ARCA, The Broadway Bookshop, London
- 2017 The Shock of the New Build and Other Contrast Old and New: Paintings by Valerie Wiffen ARCA, a show of paintings and drawings, The Broadway Bookshop, London
- 2018 – 2019, New Paintings and Drawings, The Broadway Bookshop, London. This show was on from 4 December 2018 – 31 January 2019
- 2021 – 2022, New Paintings and Drawings, The Broadway Bookshop, London. This show was on from 15 December 2021 – 30 January 2022

== Selected work in group shows and national collections ==
1972 - Liverpool Bluecoat Gallery
1963 - 1966 inclusions in the annual exhibition of the New English Art Club
1996 - Inclusion in the annual exhibition of the New English Art Club
1963 - 1997 numerous inclusions in the summer exhibition of Royal Academy of Arts, London
1994 - 2000 present, annual inclusions in the tutor's show at West Dean Summer School
1998 - London School of Economics
2000 - National Portrait Gallery (permanent collection)
2017 - HUMAN group show, The German Embassy, London

== Publications ==
Wiffen has written various books on drawing including Collins Learn to Draw – Still Life and Figure Sketching School: The Essential Step-by-step Guide to Sketching Accurate Life-like Figures (Reader's Digest).
