= Sigrid Holmwood =

British/Swedish artist (born 1978)

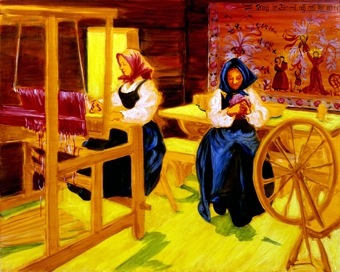
- The Spinners (2007)
- Born: 19 November 1978 (age 47); Hobart, Tasmania, Australia
- Education: The Ruskin School of Fine Art and Drawing
- Known for: Painting

Sigrid Holmwood (19 November 1978) is a British/Swedish artist known for paintings that integrate and examine historical art practices. She lives and works in London.

== Life ==
Holmwood was born in 1978 in Hobart, Australia. She was educated at the Ruskin School of Art, University of Oxford (BFA, 2000) and the Royal College of Art, London (MA in Painting, 2002).

== Work ==
Her paintings are historical re-enactments of the work of a painter of peasant life, referencing sixteenth century genre-painting and nineteenth century impressionism. She sometimes performs in costume while she paints, dressed in clothing accurate to the 17th C subject of her paintings. In line with her interest in historical accuracy and reenacting old techniques as part of her contemporary practice, she makes her own handmade paints according to historic recipes. Holmwood is known to use traditional materials and techniques in a playful manner, for instance combining fluorescent pigments with egg tempera.
