= Lee Jinjoon =

Korean artist and professor

Julian Jinjoon Lee FRSA
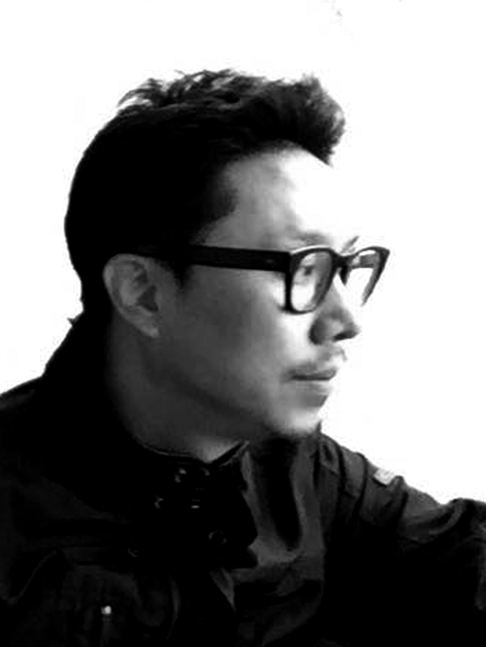
- Julian Jinjoon Lee
- Education: University of Oxford, Royal College of Art, Seoul National University
- Known for: contemporary art media art Sculpture/creative director
- Notable work: Good morning, Mr. G-Dagon
- Movement: New media art; Post-digital art
- Website: Official Website

Julian Jinjoon Lee FRSA (이진준; born in Masan, South Korea; permanent resident in the United Kingdom) is a contemporary artist and professor at KAIST who also serves as a Visiting Fellow at Exeter College, Oxford, University of Oxford, and an Affiliate Professor at New York University.

== Education ==
After graduating from the Business School of Seoul National University in 2001, he obtained a BFA and an MFA in art college from SNU. He then went on to pursue a master's degree in Moving Image(Jane and Louise Wilson) and Design Interaction (Anthony Dunne) at the Royal College of Art in London, and a Doctor of Philosophy in Fine Art from the Ruskin School of Fine Art, and St Hugh's College, University of Oxford.

== Career ==
He is a Fellow of the Royal Society of Arts (FRSA) and a member of the Royal Society of Sculptors (MRSS). Lee's studio is perhaps best known for the public media sculpture They, which was permanently installed at Digital Media City, Seoul in 2010, and has also gained international recognition for directing the satellite-based media art project Good Morning, Mr. G-Dragon and the large-scale citizen-participatory media performance Cine-Forest: Awakening Bloom. He is currently an associate professor at KAIST (Korea Advanced Institute of Science and Technology) and the founding director of the KAIST Art and Technology Center. In addition to his role at KAIST, Lee holds international academic appointments, including a Supernumerary Visiting Fellowship at Exeter College, University of Oxford. He previously served as a Visiting Scholar at St John's College, Oxford, University of Oxford. He also held a Visiting Researcher position at Tokyo University of the Arts. He is currently an Affiliate Professor at New York University.
