= Charles J. V. Murphy =

American journalist and author

Charles J. V. Murphy (October 11, 1904 – December 29, 1987) was an American journalist and author. He was the ghostwriter of King Edward VIII’s best-selling autobiography, A King's Story (1951), about the monarch’s decision to abdicate the throne in order to marry Wallis Warfield Simpson. Murphy also earned a William the Silent Award from Prince Bernhard of the Netherlands and a Distinguished Public Service Medal from the United States Department of Defense.

== Early life and education ==
Murphy was born in Newton, Massachusetts, on October 11, 1904, to artist James P. Murphy of Nova Scotia. He excelled in school and enrolled in Harvard College at the age of 16, though he left after two years to pursue a career in journalism. While at Harvard, he worked as a rewriter for the Boston American.

== Career ==
In 1925, Murphy moved to New York City to join the staff of the Associated Press. He later worked as a night cable editor for the United Press, though he was later fired for fabricating details in an article about the fall of Nanking. Though much of the account was fictional, it marked the first time a piece from the United Press had dominated the international press. Murphy was subsequently hired by the New York Evening Post, where he wrote about transatlantic flights between Europe and North America. He also worked as a reporter at the New York World.

Murphy earned a living as a freelance journalist between 1930 and 1933. During this time, he wrote the book Little America (1930) for explorer Richard Byrd. He developed a close friendship with the adventurer, who would later serve as Murphy’s best man at his wedding to Jane Brevoort Walden, with whom he had four children.

Shortly after the publication of Little America, the reporter accompanied Byrd on a two-year expedition to Antarctica, broadcasting updates from the project for the Columbia Broadcasting Company. Murphy proved influential in shaping Byrd’s reputation as an American hero, an image that helped the explorer secure funding for future expeditions. He additionally wrote two more books for Byrd: Discovery (1935) and Alone (1938).

In 1935, Murphy began working for American magazine publisher Henry Luce, with whom he would maintain a decades-long professional relationship, being a frequent contributor for Luce’s magazines Time, Life, and Fortune. At Fortune, Murphy specialized in articles about intelligence and defense, serving as Washington bureau chief for the publication. He worked as a foreign correspondent in China in 1945 (replacing the former correspondent Theodore White) before accepting a position as a senior editor at Life magazine.

In May of 1941, Murphy was a passenger on the Egyptian boat Zamzam, which was sunk by the German military. He published a detailed account of the attack and subsequent rescue in Life magazine.

In 1961, Murphy reportedly angered U.S. President John F. Kennedy when he published an article titled "How the Cuban Invasion Failed" that criticized the involvement of the American military in the Bay of Pigs. Despite Kennedy's alleged negative reaction (or possibly because of it), the piece earned an Overseas Press Club Award for best foreign reporting.

== Military service ==
Murphy served as a colonel in the Air Force Reserve throughout the 1950s and 1960s after being appointed Chief Advisor to the Air Force in 1951. During this time, he acted as the head of Air Force public relations and was an advisor and speechwriter for various NATO officials. Murphy also worked as an assistant to Supreme Allied Commander Lauris Norstad and in 1957 he helped to draft MC71, the original plan for the defense of Europe in the case of nuclear attack. Additionally, Murphy developed a friendship with James Jesus Angleton, the former counterintelligence chief of the CIA.

== Death ==
On December 29, 1987, the 83-year-old Murphy died of lung cancer in his home in Grafton, Vermont, where he had moved in 1980. At the time of his death, he was working on a book about James Angleton.

== Bibliography ==
=== Non-fiction ===
- Parachute (1930)
- The Lives of Winston Churchill (1945) (co-written with John Davenport)
- The Windsor Story (1979) (co-written with J. Bryan III)

=== As ghostwriter ===
- For Richard Byrd
  - Little America (1930)
  - Discovery (1935)
  - Alone (1938)
- A King's Story (1951) for King Edward VIII
