= Paul Wager =

British painter and sculptor

Paul Wager (born 1949) is a British painter and sculptor who studied at Sunderland and Newcastle Polytechnics, then the Royal College of Art. He was assistant to the sculptor Lynn Chadwick and taught at Cheltenham and Winchester Schools of Art; Central School of Art & Design; then sculpture at Loughborough University School of Art and Design. His works include large scale bronze and steel sculptures and paintings which relate to insurrection, anarchy and revolution.

== Work ==
Wager was a member of the Loughborough group of sculptors. Several of his works are included in the public art collection of the Loughborough University.

== Gallery ==
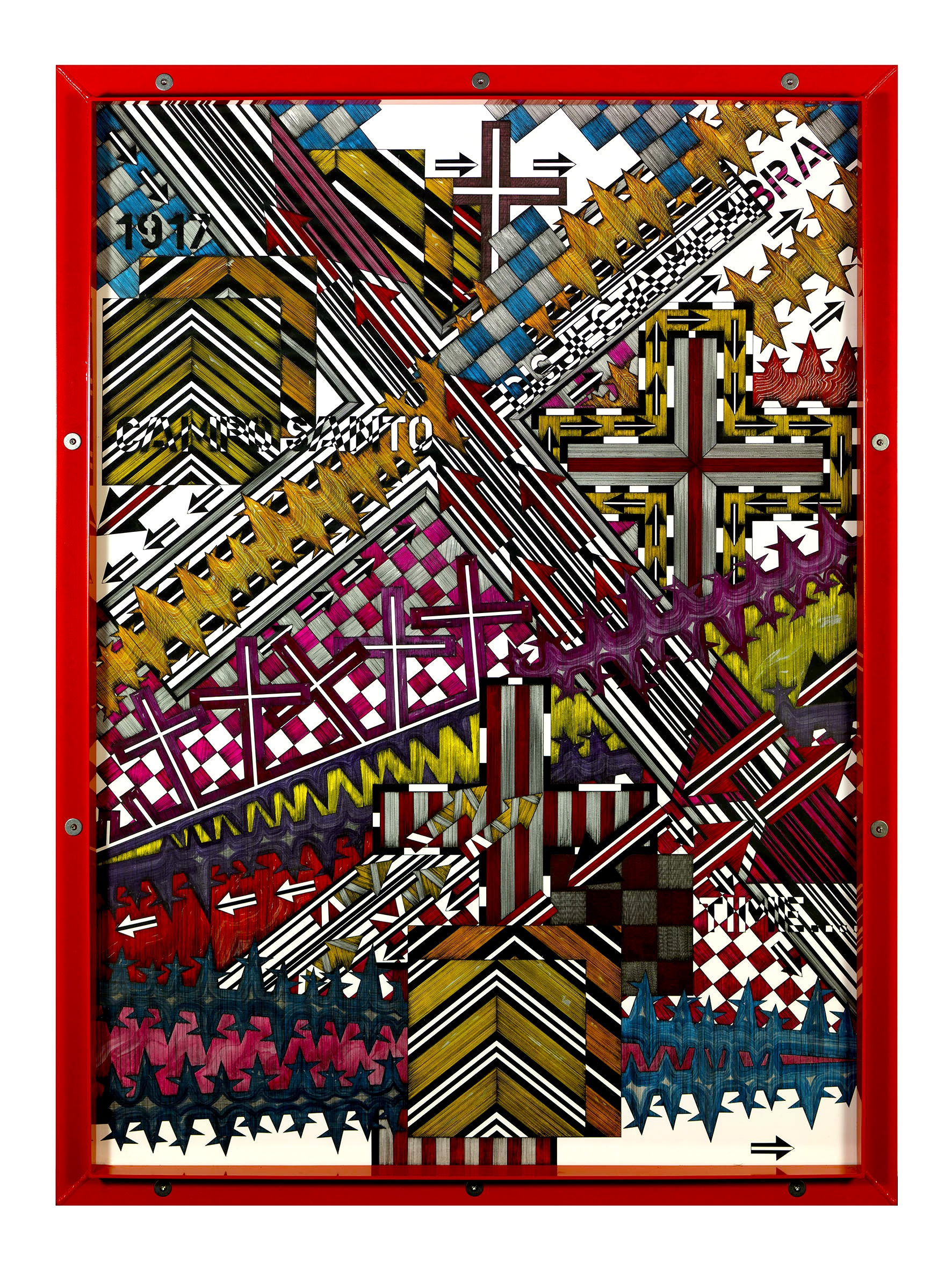
'2017'

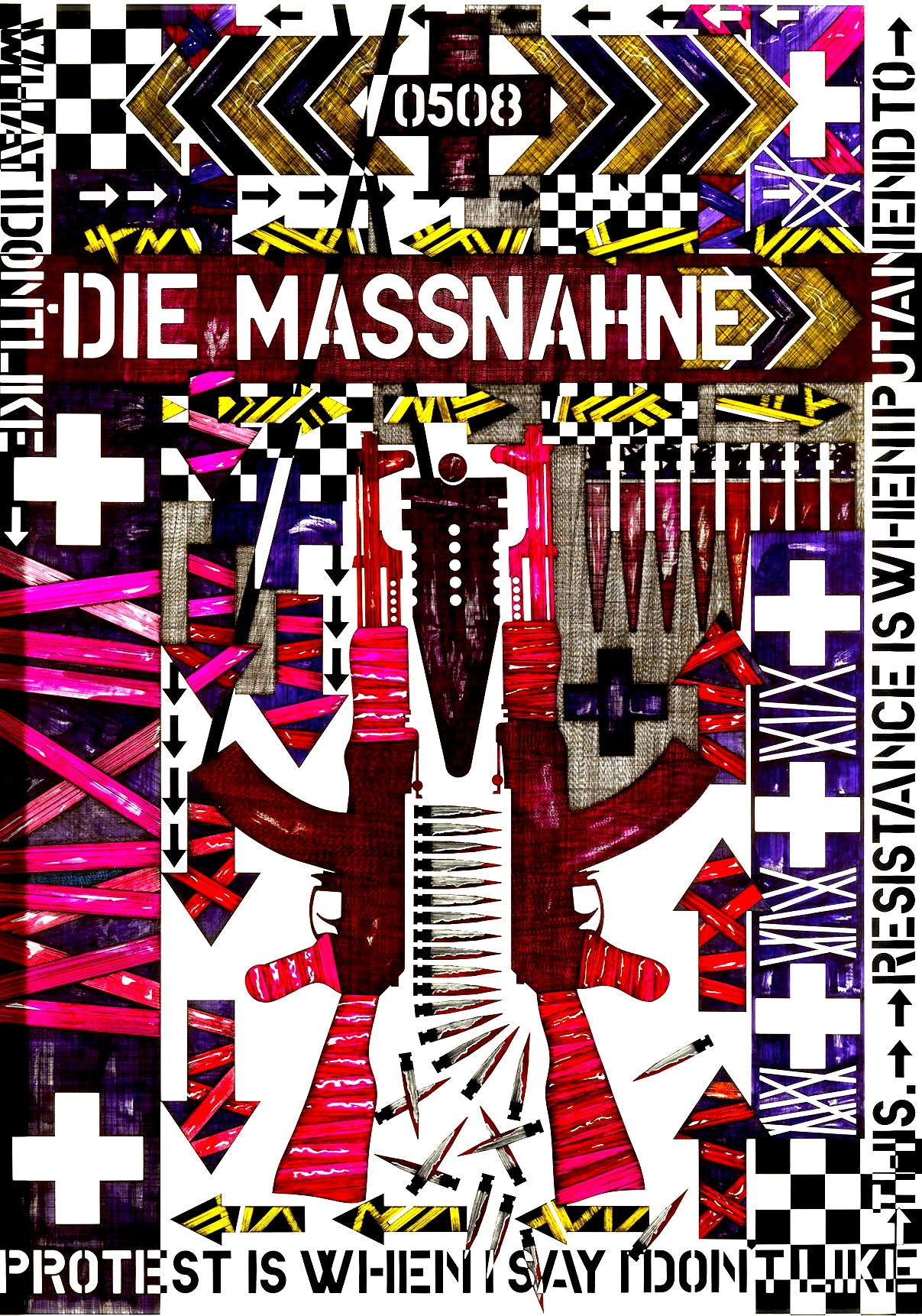
'White Room 3'
