= Chuck Murphy (singer) =

American singer-songwriter

- Born: Charles Martin Murphy; May 16, 1955 (age 71); Palmdale, CA
- Occupations: Singer; songwriter; musician
- Website: chuckmurphy.net/home

Chuck Murphy Charles Martin Murphy (born May 16, 1955) is an American singer, songwriter, and musician. Murphy has written and co-written songs such as I Know, How Many Times, Cowgirls, Light That Shines, Falling Star and Peace Be With You.

== Early life ==
Murphy started playing guitar at the age of 12 while listening to the Rolling Stones and Bob Dylan. In high school he played guitar for Young Life and enjoyed how music pulled people together with love. After high school, he followed in his oldest brother's footsteps and joined the U. S. Navy to earn a free college education. Later he would say it was a high price to pay for an education, believing we should never have been in Vietnam.

After the military, Murphy went to college in Jacksonville, Florida. He was taken in by the guitar based Southern Rock of the time and was in and out of several bands. Wanting to play the songs he was writing, Murphy started what would be 12 years of performing as a solo act on the east coast of the US.In 1992, Murphy's band Maxwell's Café, which he formed in 1990, released the album, Stories From, with the single White Lies, which got some airplay in the US Midwest. Murphy's first solo EP, Peace Be With You, co-produced by Murphy and Jeff Silverman and released in September 2016, went to #1 on the Billboard charts in November 2016.

== Songwriting for Others ==
The band, The Good Times recorded Murphy's song Street Wise in 1982. Murphy moved to California in 2000 where he met singer, songwriter, and producer Jeff Silverman and started working with singer Elisa Fiorillo Deese. After recording several songs with Fiorello, they put out a country record, "Light That Shines." Over the years Murphy has had several songs used in movies and TV including Mitch Hedberg's movie Los Enchiladas!, Herman USA and others.

== Achievements ==
The song, Falling Star, has been nominated for 2016 HMMA (Hollywood Music in Media Award) in the Americana/Folk/Acoustic Category while Peace Be With You was also nominated in the Singer/Songwriter category.

In 2016, Murphy won the Independent Music Network Award for Favorite Country Impact Artist and the New Music Award from New Music Weekly Magazine for AC Breakthrough Artist of the Year. In 2015, he won two Independent Music Network Awards with his single, How Many Times, for Mainstream Impact Artist and Favorite Crossover Artist.

His EP, Peace Be With You has debuted on the Billboard charts on a number of Categories, including the Heatseeker Chart (#6), the Americana/Folk Album Chart (#17), the Independent Album Chart (#45), the Top Rock Album Chart, and the Top 10 on 7 of the Regional Heatseeker Charts in October 2016.

== Activism and Music ==
In 2016, Murphy continues his long-time activism for Peace in America with his song Peace Be With You. In his video interview, Peace Be With You – Behind The Scenes, he asks America to open their hearts and minds and embrace each other.

== Discography ==
Yr	Album #	Release title	Time
2016	Peace Be With You	Peace Be With You	3:39
2016	Rockabilly & Hillbilly Hell Raisers	Nosey Joe	2:16
2016	Rockabilly Roundup 7	Rhythm Hall	2:20
2016	Rockabilly Rumble Volume Seven	Rhythm Hall	2:16
2016	Peace Be With You	Falling Star	4:10
2016	Peace Be With You	Rolling Down the Highway	4:18
2016	Peace Be With You	How Many Times	3:48
2016	Peace Be With You	Whisper on the Wind	4:16
2016	Peace Be With You	Cowgirls	3:34
2016	Peace Be With You	How Many Times (Remix)	4:05
2016	Peace Be With You	Peace Be with You (Remix)	3:46
2016	Peace Be With You	Whisper on the Wind (EP Version	5:16
2016	Peace Be With You	How Many Times (EP Version)	6:08
2016	Peace Be With You	Peace Be with You (World Remix)	4:36
2016	Peace Be With You – Single	Peace Be With You	3:46
