= Fiona Lloyd-Davies =

Fiona Lloyd-Davies is a photojournalist and documentary maker whose work is focused on human rights abuses in conflict zones. She is a graduate of the Royal College of Art and has won various awards for her work.

In 2000 Lloyd-Davies produced a documentary Licence to Kill, for which the Royal Television Society (RTS) awarded her the Best International Journalism of the Year. In 2005 her documentary The Baghdad Blogger: Salam Pax won another RTS award. In 2010 Lloyd-Davies traveled to the Democratic Republic of Congo to film a documentary for BBC3 titled, The World`s Most Dangerous Place for Women and to work on an independent project titled, Field of Hope.

She is a former producer for the BBC show, Newsnight.

== Bibliography ==
- "Licence To Kill". BBC. 4 September 2000.
- "Guardian Films Awards". The Guardian. 16 February 2009.
- Heath, Diane (25 March 2004). "Rwanda ten years on". The Guardian.
- Holmes, Georgina (2013). Women and War in Rwanda: Gender, Media and the Representation of Genocide. I.B.Tauris. ISBN 978-1780763477.
- Hoskins, Andrew; O'Loughlin, Ben (2010). War and Media. Polity. ISBN 978-0745638508.
- Lloyd-Davies, Fiona (23 August 2012). "Opinion: Why have men lost touch with reality over rape?". CNN.
- Lloyd-Davies, Fiona (24 May 2013). "Rape in DR Congo: Victims and Torturers". Pulitzer Center.
- Sauer, Maddy (12 June 2013). "'When we rape we feel free': Congo soldiers' shocking stories". MSN News. Archived from the original on 1 July 2014.
