= Charlie Murphy (artist) =

British artist

Charlie Murphy is an artist currently based in London, UK, whose work includes photography, sculpture, video and participatory events. Her work has been presented at the Venice Biennale 2005, the Edinburgh Festival 2006, and in galleries and museums including Tate Modern 2007, London’s Science Museum and The Science Gallery, Dublin. She is based at ACAVA Studios in London and has been an ArtSway Artist Associate since 2003.

== Life ==
She graduated from the Royal College of Art, with an MA in Fine Art (Photography) in 1999. She is best known for her work exploring intimacy, sexuality, and the competitive aspects of human nature. Through photographic, performative, and sculptural processes, video, installations, and live art events, several contexts in which a variety of people are invited to perform are created. Murphy's catalog of artistic works encompasses sensual and territorial behaviors, including the rituals and customs of rural and domestic life.

Recurrent materials in her practice include glass, light, fibre-optics, photographic papers and emulsions, latex and ribbons. Certain aspects of her practice involve the participation of a large number of people.

Murphy lectures in photography at Kingston University, the University of Gloucester, the Arts University College at Bournemouth, and the University of East Anglia.

== Works ==
- The Anatomy of Desire (1999–2010)
- Kiss-ins: Since 1999, Charlie Murphy has collected kisses from all over the world by asking participants to donate their kisses to her trademark ‘kiss-in’ events. Murphy and her assistants invite couples, friends, and strangers to kiss for 90 seconds while a dental alginate sets in their mouths. These casts are then turned into glass sculptures through a series of positive and negative mold-making processes. The kiss-in events toured a number of both national and international venues.
  - kiss Video (99–09): a video portrait created from documentation of these events
- The Art of Tickling Trout and Other Sensual Pleasures (2003)
- Country Dancing on the Circle Line (2004)
- Cut Glass & Plant Harlotry photogram series (2004-ongoing) - referencing early 'photogenic' drawings by Fox Talbot and trompe-l'œil
- Seaside Sheep Show (2006), produced in collaboration with Aspex Gallery, Portsmouth
- Opening (2006): a performance and sculptural installation for Sugarcoated at Artsway (2006)
- Salute (2006–9) is an ongoing performance work for tall ships, involving maritime training, aerial and dance choreography, and a long-term research and training project in flying trapeze.
- The Big Wheel (2008) is a live cartwheel chain event performed on London’s Millennium Bridge by over 150 participants for The Mayor’s Big Dance Festival. The longest-ever acrobatic chain to be staged in London, this was created in collaboration with several gymnastic clubs and hosted by Tate Modern.
- Linnaeus is a series of glass sculptures on plant sexuality within the botanical collections of The Museum of Garden History and The Linnaean Society, interpreting an illustration of Linnaeus’s ‘Sexual System’ by ‘Ehret’ from 1736.

== Collections ==
Her works are held by Hayley Newman, Tate Modern; The Linnaean Society, London; the University of Aberystwth; Danielle Arnaud, London; and Vic Reeves.

== Publications ==
- The Anatomy of Desire, published by text work, the Arts University College at Bournemouth, 2010. Includes essays by Luce Irigaray, Leonore Tiefer and Alistair Gentry. ISBN 978-0-901196-41-5
- Plant Harlotry, booklet published to accompany an exhibition at Dissenters' Chapel, 2007
- Sugarcoated, ArtSway, 2006, ISBN 978-0-9543930-7-6
- The Art of Tickling Trout and Other Sensual Pleasures, ArtSway, with essay by Kathy Kubicki, 2003, ISBN 978-0-9543930-1-4
- Rosette Contribution to Fash’n’Riot, Artist Limited Edition publication toured in British Council exhibition, 2002 & 2004
- The Glass Border, exhibition catalogue, Danielle Arnaud Gallery, London, 1999
- Light Sensitive, York City Art Gallery, 1998
- Everyone In Farnham, Cornerhouse & James Hockey Gallery, Farnham 1994
