= William Kay Blacklock =

British painter (1872–1924)

- Born: William Blacklock; 1872; Bishopwearmouth, Sunderland, England
- Died: 11 August 1924 (aged 51–52); Polperro, Liskeard, England
- Known for: Painting

William Kay Blacklock (1872 – 11 August 1924) was a British artist in the mediums of watercolours and oils.

== Biography ==
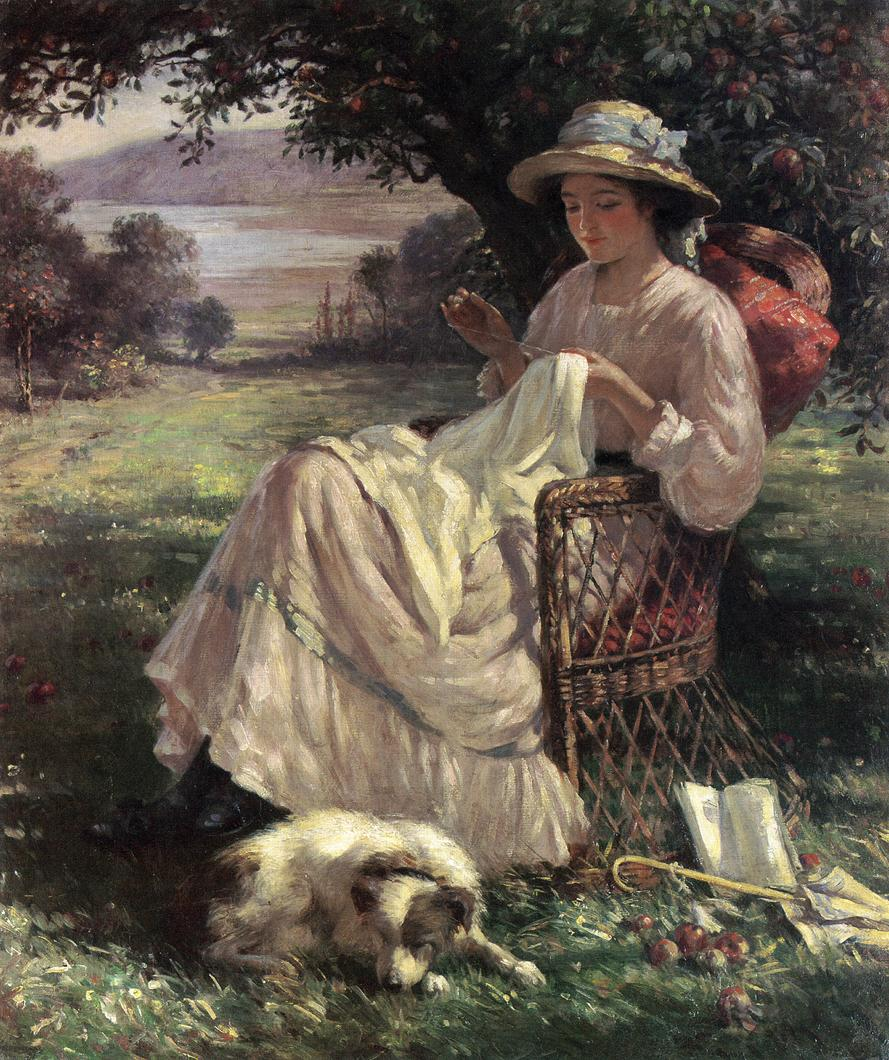
Sunlight and Shadow, c. 1900

William Blacklock was born in Bishopwearmouth, Sunderland, in North East England, in 1872. He was one of three children of John Blacklock, an engine fitter, and his wife Isabella. His father died in 1886. According to the 1891 census, William was 18 years old and was working as a lithographer's apprentice, while living with his widowed mother. He continued to live with his mother, at least until 1901, practising the trade of lithography. It seems that he added Kay as his middle name when he became an artist.

Probate was granted on the estate of William Kilbride Blacklock who died 11 August 1924 to Ellen Eliza Blacklock, widow, and Septimus Edward Scott, artist. The birth of William Kilbride Blacklock was registered in the second quarter of 1870, in registration district Sunderland. His parents were William Blacklock and Eleanor Kilbride. The 1871 Census of Bishopwearmouth describes his father as "painter". The first use of William Kay Blacklock seems to appear in his 1911 census at Chelsea. At birth and death it appears he was William Kilbride Blacklock and that his parentage, as above, was previously been attributed incorrectly.

Blacklock married Ellen Richardson from Hackney, London. The couple made their first home in Chelsea, London, where Blacklock attended the Royal College of Art. They moved to Edinburgh in 1902, and Blacklock began studying at the Edinburgh School of Art. After completing his studies there, the couple moved again in 1906, to join an active artists' colony at Walberswick in Suffolk. The colony had been founded by the artist Philip Wilson Steer, who gathered around him a circle of English Impressionists. Between 1908 and 1915 the Blacklocks lived at "The Barn" in Walberswick.

His wife, who was called "Nellie", modelled for him, as did their daughter Eleanor. Their only child, Eleanor Irene, was born in Chelsea during 1910.

A painter in both watercolours and oils, Blacklock exhibited 17 works at the Royal Academy between 1897 and 1918, and also exhibited his works at the Royal Institute of Oil Painters.

He was still at Walberswick in 1914, but later moved to St Ives in Cambridgeshire, and finally Leicester. He signed his paintings W Kay Blacklock, and he probably also painted in the Netherlands, as some of his paintings suggest.

He died at Polperro, in 1924, and is buried there, in the civil parish of Liskeard.

== Works ==
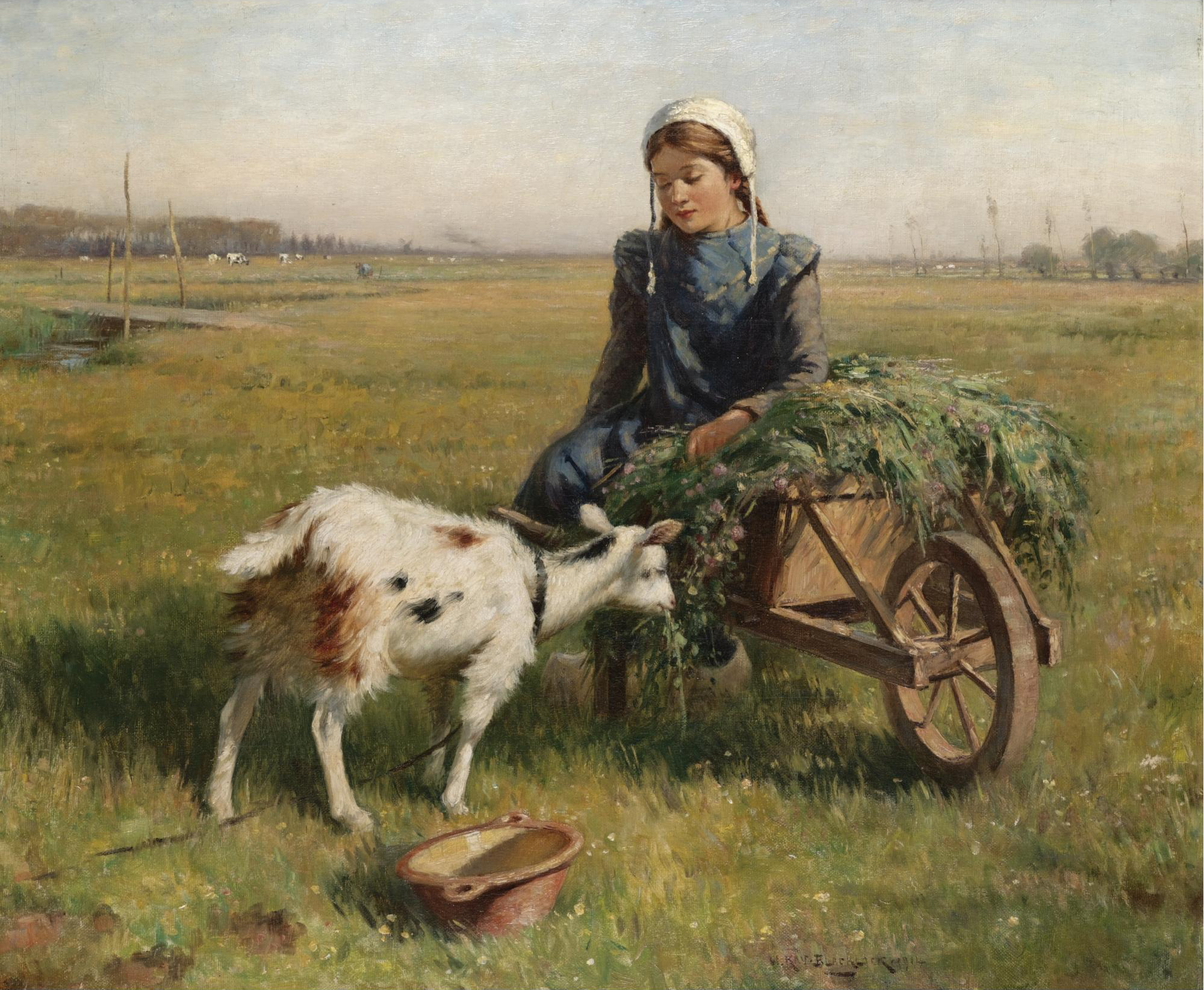
A Dutch Idyll, 1914

While Blacklock was at Edinburgh School of Art, in 1905, he was commissioned to undertake two paintings to be hung in the chancel of St Andrew's Episcopal Church, Innerleithen; these were to commemorate Reverend J. G. Ferguson. During 1907, Blacklock painted the oil on canvas Going to Church; it measures 54 × 41.6 cm (21.3 × 16.4 in). It was purchased by the National Liverpool Museum the same year it was painted.

Philip Wilson Steer, (1860-1942), founded a colony of artists in Walberswick, which Blacklock joined. Although Steer was the leading figure of the British Impressionist school, Blacklock did not adopt this style. Instead he painted in a style closer to traditional Victorian genre painting, depicting rural life and landscapes. Traces of the French realism influenced by Jean-François Millet (1814-1875) and Jules Bastien-Lepage (1848-1884) are also shown in Blacklock's technique. His themes are close to the academic realism. His attitude to nature is demonstrated by the titles of a number of his Royal Academy exhibits: Evening Glow – Rye 1901, A Sunny Hillside, 1902 and A Sunny Corner, 1911, and a Dutch Idyll in 1914. The tendency towards realism, and the distinctiveness of his personal interpretation of country life, have meant that Blacklock still enjoys a certain popularity as a watercolourist and painter.

== Gallery ==
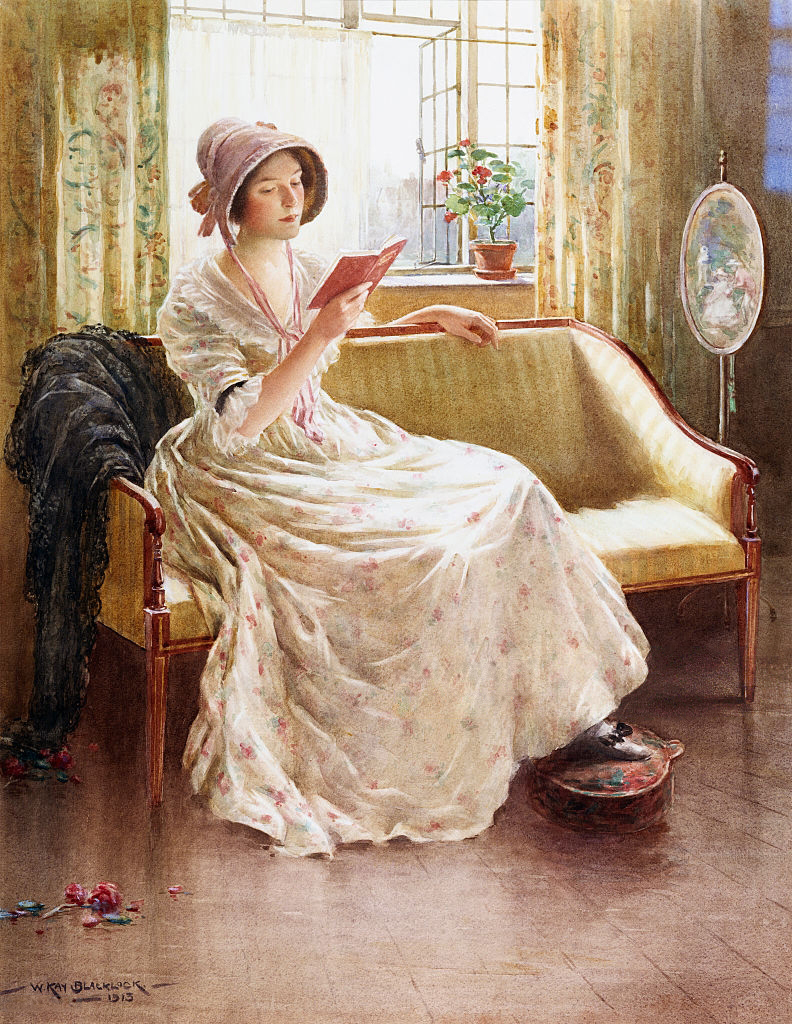
A Quiet Read, circa 1900

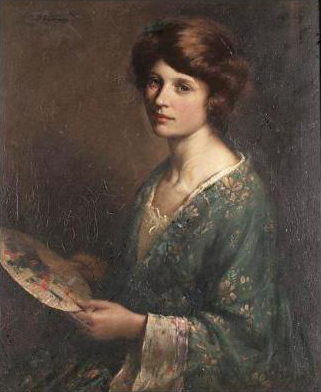
The Blue Kimono, 1872

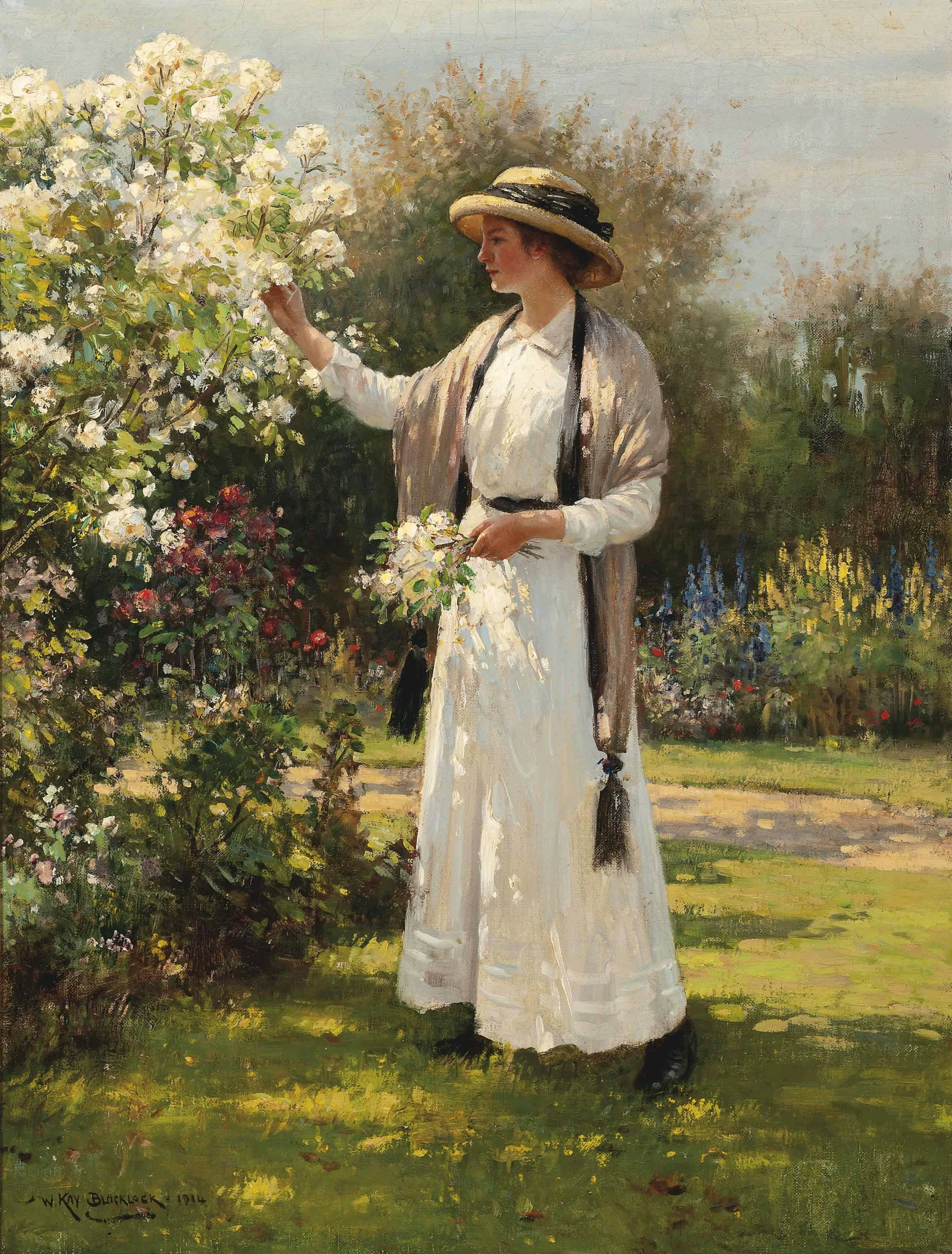
Summertime, 1914
