= Helen Frances Gregor =

Czech-Canadian artist (1921–1989)

- Born: 28 June 1921; Prague, Czechoslovakia
- Died: 25 May 1989 (aged 67); Seoul, South Korea
- Known for: textile art

Helen Frances Gregor CM RCA (28 June 1921 – 25 May 1989) was a Czech-Canadian artist who specialised in textile art.

== Career ==
Gregor was born in Prague in Czechoslovakia, the daughter of Fred and Lily Lorenz. She was considering a career in theatrical design, but moved with her family to England in 1940 to escape the Second World War. She studied art at Newark Technical College, Birmingham College of Art, and at the Royal College of Art's School of Design in London. She exhibited at the Czechoslovak Club, and at Liberty's of London. She also studied at the American School of Craftsmen in Rochester, New York.

She married Tibor Gregor, who had been born in Slovakia and had moved to London to study at the London School of Economics. He served in a Czech battalion with British Army in the Second World War. They had two children. Her husband became an executive director of the Canadian Soft Drinks Association, and was a district governor of Rotary International, and its treasurer in 1981-82 and director in 1980–82, and a trustee of the Rotary Foundation from 1986 to 1989.

Gregor moved to Canada with her husband, and became a teacher at Ontario College of Art and Design in Toronto in 1952, where she founded and became head of the textile department. She worked in textile art, creating tapestries.

She exhibited at the "Triennial of Tapestry" in Łódź twice. She had a solo exhibition Helen Frances Gregor: Textiles in Architecture at the Textile Museum in Toronto in 1990. Examples of her work are held by the Canadian Museum of Civilization, the National Gallery of Canada and the Art Gallery of Ontario.

She was a member of the Royal Canadian Academy of Arts, the Ontario Society of Artists, and the Ontario Crafts Council. She won Ontario Crafts Council's Mather Award in 1982, and was appointed as a Member of the Order of Canada in 1987. The Ontario Crafts Council established the Helen Frances Gregor scholarship in her honour.

Her book The fabric of my life: reflections of Helen Frances Gregor, RCA was published in 1987.

Gregor died of a heart attack in Seoul, South Korea. Her husband died in 2008.
