= Edward Rayne =

Shoe designer and businessman

Sir Edward Rayne
- Edward Rayne in 1975.
- Born: Edward Rayne; 19 August 1922; US
- Died: 7 February 1992 (aged 69); Bexhill-on-Sea, East Sussex
- Other name: Eddie Rayne (bridge)
- Occupations: chairman and managing director of H. & M. Rayne Ltd (1951–87); board of governors Genesco Inc., (167–73); director Debenhams Ltd (1975–1988); president Debenhams Inc., (1976–86); executive chairman Harvey Nichols (1978–88)
- Notable credit(s): FRSA (1971), CVO (1977); Chevalier l'Ordre Nationale du Mérité (1984); knighthood (1988)

Sir Edward Rayne (19 August 1922 – 7 February 1992) was head of H. & M. Rayne (often simply known as Rayne), one of the foremost British manufacturers of high-end and couture shoes. With a Royal Warrant to both the Queen and Queen Mother, Rayne shoes were worn by high society and film stars.

Under his stewardship H. & M. Rayne took a stake in Genesco – then the largest shoe company in the world – secured licensing deals with Bergdorf Goodman and Bonwit Teller and encouraged British designers to embark on franchising. Having served a long apprenticeship in making shoes at the family firm, he was also a skilled designer – Jean Muir described him as the best British shoemaker of his age.

Rayne served on the boards of Debenhams and Harvey Nichols (director and chairman respectively) and was a high-profile ambassador for British fashion; he was chair of the Incorporated Society of London Fashion Designers (IncSoc) and its successor the British Fashion Council (BFC), as well as working for numerous other trade and industry bodies. He did much to place London Fashion Week on the international map; his Guardian obituary said: "If any single man persuaded American fashion buyers and correspondents to take London Fashion Week seriously, it was Rayne".

As Eddie Rayne, he was a talented bridge player, representing England at the age of 21 and becoming the European Bridge Champion at the age of 26. An interview shortly before he took up his role as chairman of the BFC also noted his facility with other card games: "He is the Sky Masterson of Mayfair. As a colleague said: 'Nobody beats Eddie at poker'."

== Early life and career ==
Edward Rayne was born in the United States – his mother Meta (née Reddish) came from New York State and met his British father Joseph Rayne in Italy, where she was training to be an opera singer. Joseph Rayne was heir to the shoe side of the family business, which was founded in 1889 as a theatrical costumier by Henry and Mary Rayne and located close to The Old Vic. Opening a store in Bond Street in 1920, Joseph cashed in on the trend for shoes as a fashion (rather than simply practical) item and by 1928 the company had become a PLC.

Edward Rayne was educated at Harrow School but left at the age of 16 because his eyesight was threatened by cataracts in both eyes. His sight was saved following surgery. The thick pebble glasses he needed for the rest of his life also became his trademark – an obituary writer compared him to Mr Magoo, while Colin McDowell described him as looking like a character from a Surtees novel. Physical comparisons were also drawn with Sergeant Bilko. He was excused from active service in the war because of this, and began a long apprenticeship at H. & M. Rayne's factory in King's Cross. His obituary in The Times noted that he would arrive at 7.45 am every morning to learn the 200 steps required to make a pair of high-end shoes. While his apprenticeship was intense, Rayne found time to master the game of bridge; he was known as Eddie as a bridge player, represented his country at the age of 21 and was part of the winning team that won both the 1948 and 1949 European championships.

=== Promotion to chairman ===
Joseph Rayne died in 1952 and, at the age of 29, Edward Rayne became chairman of the family firm.

He had inherited a company that was very much part of the British society dress code. It had acquired the first of its Royal Warrants to Queen Mary and its early customers also included Lillie Langtry. A pair of flat pumps with a bow originally designed for the actress Gertrude Lawrence remained the company's best-selling line for 50 years, worn by society and theatricals alike.

The company was active as an exporter – its shoes were sold to 12 countries – and had high-profile clients such as Vivien Leigh, Ava Gardner and Rita Hayworth who were paying up to £40 for a pair of Rayne shoes. Edward Rayne was able to capitalise on that existing foothold – and his Stateside roots – and a decade after he took over the firm he established a joint venture with US shoe firm Delman, giving Rayne a presence in New York's Fifth Avenue. The Rayne link with Delman went back to the 1930s; Rayne's 1954 review to shareholders noted that the company's three shops, Rayne and Delman in Bond Street and Rayne in Regent Street had produced record profits.

== 1960s developments ==
Edward Rayne expanded the Rayne business in the early 1960s, beginning an association with Genesco in the United States and also buying a 49 per cent stake in the British company of John Plant and its subsidiary Butlers. Rayne still designed shoes himself – his ebony brown patent leather design was mentioned in a Times report about the autumn fashion show of IncSoc members. Rayne was, by then both chair and associate member of the group of elite London couturiers. He was appointed a member of the Export Council for Europe in 1961.

Rayne enlisted the help of leading stage designer Oliver Messel for the new Delman shoe store that opened in Old Bond Street in 1960. This was a radical retailing concept for the time because, whereas upmarket shoe stores had been discreet enclaves dressed with curtains and pot plants, with shoes consigned to underground stores, this refit incorporated display stands and cases, some of them illuminated, to show off hundreds of pairs of shoes. An article by Alison Settle in The Observer noted that: "Mr Messel and Mr Rayne are at one in thinking that shoes to buy should be as easy to see and handle as books in a library". He continued the Rayne brand's reputation for luxury; Princess Margaret's white satin wedding shoes (along with the Queen and Queen Mother's shoes) were all Rayne models.

By 1960, the shoes designed by Roger Vivier for Dior were made at Rayne's UK factory and personally supervised by Edward Rayne. Four years later, Vivier began selling Rayne brand shoes in his Rue François store in Paris, and the straight set back heel Rayne had introduced a year earlier was, he told The Guardian, "fashion right" and included across the Rayne and Miss Rayne lines. While high-end and haute couture were part of the company's pedigree, Edward Rayne always had an eye on the more mainstream direction of fashion – he was the first to display Mary Quant shoes in his flagship store, placing them alongside those of Roger Vivier. He also gained a foothold in the mass market, ensuring the company had an interest in both H.E. Randall and Lotus chainstores. By 1966, he was managing what were known as 'Young Design quartet' – Jean Muir, Roger Nelson, Moya Bowler and Gerald McCann – capitalising on London's thirst for younger designers by getting them to design fashionable shoes in a more affordable price bracket, with designs being sold in Harrods and some high-street shoe shops.

== 1970s and beyond ==
Edward Rayne continued to work with haute couture brands in both the UK and overseas. By 1970, Rayne shoes were included in the Molyneux collection – with The Guardian reporting that it was thought to be the first time a French couture house had used branded British shoes. In autumn of that year, Rayne opened its own store in Paris – said to be the first shoemaker to do so since Lobb. Rayne was also designing shoes for other French designers, including Nina Ricci and Lanvin, while in the UK it had recruited designers such as Bill Gibb.

In 1975, Rayne was sold to the department-store chain Debenhams, at which point Edward Rayne joined the boards of Debenhams and Harvey Nichols. Two years later, he was made a CVO by the Queen. By 1980, Rayne shoes were exported to 16 countries and Edward Rayne was chair of the multiple fashion division of Debenhams, which included worldwide Rayne-Delman shoe shops.

Debenhams was sold to Burton Group in 1985, and two years later Rayne was acquired by the businessman David Graham. Edward Rayne then resigned and focused on his other roles. He was recruited by Marks & Spencer as a consultant for its growing shoe range. He also continued to act as a consultant to Harvey Nichols. He was knighted in 1988 for services to the fashion industry – France had awarded him its equivalent (a chevalier) four years earlier.

== Other roles ==
Rayne was active in various national industry bodies, notably serving on the Export Council of Europe between 1962 and 1971 and the Franco British Council between 1980 and 1988. He was active too within industry-specific bodies, serving as president of the British Footwear Manufacturers' Association and the British Boot and Shoe Institution.

In addition to his national honours, he was made a fellow of the Royal Society of Arts in 1971 and was made Master of the Worshipful Company of Pattern Makers in 1981, one of the livery companies of the City of London.

=== IncSoc and British Fashion Council ===
In 1960, Rayne became chairman of IncSoc, the first chair not drawn from the world of couture garment design – significant since normally IncSoc was presided over by a fashion designer, not an accessories maker. His businesslike approach was to serve the society well, as noted in a 1985 article: "Rayne's great success with the Incorporated Society was in raising money. Courtauld's [sic] were major patrons and donated £10,000 per year". Courtaulds was a major boost – funding IncSoc for a decade – but Rayne also brought in the foreign orders, chartering a plane from Paris to capture the US buyers who had hitherto bypassed London. He would later say that British designers didn't capitalise on all the opportunities brought about by the Swinging London publicity: "As a country, we blew the sixties, threw them away! The designers had the British disease, they couldn't understand the delicate balance between commerce and design".

After IncSoc petered out, Rayne formed part of the self-appointed collective – along with Vogue editor Beatrix Miller, former war correspondent and diplomat's wife Lady Henderson, Jean Muir and Terence Conran – who enlisted the support of the British government and high-profile figures for the promotion of British fashion; this included assistance from Princess Diana, who became a high-profile clothes-horse for British designs, handed out awards and hosted a reception at Kensington Palace to celebrate fashion's high flyers. Rayne was a natural fit for chair of the British Fashion Council. As The Times put it in 1988, he: "marshalled London's notoriously independent-minded designers into a united team, harnessed their creative energy to the financial support provided by the industry's largest clothing manufacturers and retail groups, and provided back up services to those designers who need them".

== Death and legacy ==
Edward Rayne was killed in a fire at his home in Bexhill, East Sussex on 7 February 1992. He was 69. His wife Phyllis was injured but survived. Both his sons continued the family association with shoemaking. His obituaries not only singled out his business acumen but also his good humour. Colin McDowell said that almost uniquely for a personality in the centre of the fashion industry, no journalist ever had a bad word to say about him. He was also held in affection by the British couturiers he promoted. Norman Hartnell used to send Christmas cards bearing the inscription: 'to the cobbler from the Little Woman Round The Corner'.

The contribution of H. & M. Rayne – especially under Edward Rayne's leadership – was showcased in an exhibitions held at the Fashion and Textile Museum in 2015. Rayne shoes are held in several archives, including the Metropolitan Museum in New York and the Victoria and Albert Museum in London. A portrait of Rayne by Howard Coster forms part of the National Portrait Gallery archive.
