= Moya Bowler =

English shoe designer

- Born: 1940 (age 85–86); Battle, East Sussex, England
- Occupation: Shoe designer

Moya Bowler (born 1940) is an English shoe designer who rose to prominence in the 1960s. She had considerable success in both the UK and US fashion markets, designing both high-end and high-street shoes.

A graduate of the Royal College of Art, she was among a crop of designers subsequently described by fashion writer and editor Brenda Polan as the "annus mirabilis", since so many of them went on to carve highly successful careers in fashion. Although she was among the stars of the 1960s avant-garde boutique scene, Bowler was also highly commercial. She produced designs for high-street chains such as Lilley & Skinner while she was still a student. But most of her commercial success came from her work in the United States, where she designed shoes for brands such as Moderne and Shoe Biz.

== Early life and career ==
Moya Bowler was born in Battle, East Sussex. She studied fashion at the Royal College of Art (RCA) under Janey Ironside and was part of a wave of new design talent that transformed British fashion in the 1960s, with a peer group that included Bill Gibb, Janice Wainwright, Marion Foale and Sally Tuffin.

She began freelance design for high street shoe companies while still a student at the RCA, after which she gained further experience by studying pattern cutting at the shoe manufacturing school Ars Sutoria in Milan and by working in a shoe factory. She attended a trade school to understand the mechanics of shoemaking.

== Rise to prominence ==
Bowler's rise to prominence on the British fashion scene was swift. A 1966 article in The Times about the progress of RCA graduates mentioned her alongside Foale and Tuffin as an "overnight success". In the same year, The Guardian noted: "Miss Bowler is a shoe doyenne at just past 20, a full-time designer with a teenage-boutique stranglehold, a very famous person in the pop-footwear world".

That year Bowler, then aged 25, travelled to the United States, first visiting the Lowell, Boston factory that would be making her first line of shoes for US retailer Moderne and then visiting New York, where she was interviewed for the New York Observer.

=== High-street designs ===
Bowler was among the 'young design quartet'—alongside Jean Muir, Roger Nelson and Gerald McCann—to produce shoes for Rayne, with designs being sold in Harrods and some high-street shoe shops. In 1967, her sandals (priced at under 4 guineas), available in brilliant colours and with filled in fronts and strappy ankle detail, were being retailed at high-street retailer Lennard shoe stores. In the same year, she also created a design in paper. A write up in The Guardian said these were: "Shoes that, with care, will last 15 wearings". Again, available at Lennards, they cost £1 and had a trim of paper flowers or pompoms.

In 1968, The Times' influential fashion editor Prudence Glynn described Bowler as: "one of the most successful shoe designers in this country". Bowler said she only used leather in her designs – finding plastic too difficult to work – and she commented on the state of the British shoe industry, saying: "The English tanners produce some of the most beautiful and the most exciting of leathers. But they're hopeless about selling, about promotion, about deliveries. They are quite unaware of the pressures of the industry they supply".

Four months later, Glynn featured her again on The Times fashion pages – noting that Bowler had begun small in the more avant-garde boutiques, but her designs were now widely available. By this stage, Bowler's shoes were also retailed in the US at Margaret Jerrold. For autumn 1968, Bowler was producing two-tone shoes, using material combinations such as snakeskin and suede, and had introduced what was described as a "medieval slipper" with ruching along the vamp. Her shoes were also being retailed in a new Sloane Street store called Sids—owned by an American called Lawrence Copley Thaw—alongside models by Ronald Paterson, Leslie Poole, Adele Davis and Simon Foster. All of them were RCA graduates and Bowler was responsible for creating 60 per cent of the shoes in the store. Sids' men's range was popular among visiting Americans—some bought six pairs at a time—and "sundry pop people", including Justin de Villeneuve and Paul McCartney.

In 1969, Bowler began designing shoes for Jerry Miller—grandson of shoe manufacturer Israel Miller—under the Jerry Edouard label. The shoes were designed in England and made in a Greece by Sevastakis.

== 1970s designs ==
Despite Bowler's frequent appearances in the British fashion press, most of her designs were sold abroad – 98 percent, according to Prudence Glynn, in an article about the parlous state of the British shoe industry in 1970. Although most of her shoes were going abroad, she remained part of the UK fashion industry as an academic, teaching at Kingston Polytechnic.

In 1970, a fashion writer said that Bowler seemed to be the only shoe designer experimenting with new materials; her new season's range for the shoe store Sacha featured platform heels in pearlised plastic with a leather upper in red, green and orange. Another pair from the same range featured two-tone heels and details and came in chocolate brown and white.

Bowler's work with leather was not just restricted to shoes; in the early 1970s she designed a sheepskin coat for Anartex, a trading name for the Alexandria-based company Donald Macdonald.

=== Move to the United States ===
In the early 1970s, Bowler went to work in the US, establishing a company called Feet and making shoes for brands such as Charles Jourdan and Rayne, as well as designing one-offs for showbusiness clients such as Elizabeth Taylor. She then launched a project in the UK in 1972 which failed. After moving into other areas – including interior design – she then returned to the US and created the Miramonte label for Marx & Newman, then a major importer of Italian shoes into the United States.

In the late 1970s, she was among the designers – alongside names such as Walter Steiger – who created shoes for Jerry Miller's Shoe Biz line in the United States.

== 1980s and beyond ==
In 1982, Bowler – then aged 41 – was interviewed by Brenda Polan for The Guardian as she embarked on a plan to bring her Miramonte label back to the UK. Polan noted that it was the fourth time Bowler had attempted to crack a market where the British Shoe Corporation's attempts to keep prices down for two decades – in the face of rising costs – had also depressed quality and design. Bowler's designs were being manufactured in Italy and she said: "I have no choice but to manufacture in Italy where the uppers are made in back kitchens by skilled machinists with few overheads or expenses". Bowler's leather was also tanned in Italy at the SALP tannery, where she was a consultant – working with shoe designers such as Manolo Blahnik and Clive Shilton.
