= James Wedge =

British fashion designer, milliner and photographer

James "Jimmy" Wedge (born 1939) is a British fashion designer, milliner and fashion photographer.

== Early life and education ==
Wedge was born into a poor working-class family. Having little education and never having taken an exam, he joined the British Navy. Whilst there, he took a drawing correspondence course and was eventually admitted to Walthamstow College of Art, entering the fashion department. Wedge describes hat design as being "like sculpture". Wedge then did a two-year course at the Royal College of Art.

== Hat designer ==
At the first end of year show, he did all the hats and drew the attention of the designer Ronald Paterson, who asked him if we would like to do hats for his collections. As they were all couture hats, Wedge designed extreme creations to showcase his talents and garner publicity. Liberty of London offered him a free workshop if they could have first choice of what to sell in his shop, although he was allowed to sell the rest elsewhere. Working out of a small house at 4 Ganton Street starting in about 1962, his staff grew to seven people. He was also able to help his art school friends Sally Tuffin and Marion Foale start as designers.

== Top Gear and Countdown ==
Together with Pat Booth, he set up the boutique Top Gear on the King's Road, London. He also set up Countdown, also on the King's Road, where the rents were low. Wedge preferred the area to Carnaby Street where he didn't appreciate the fashion. They bought their stock in very short runs from local craftwork suppliers. According to Wedge, Mick Jagger's famous white frock, worn at 1969's Stones in the Park free concert in London's Hyde Park came from Countdown.

== Influence ==
Wedge helped Marion Foale and Sally Tuffin become established as designers and retailers. According to Tuffin, to make their clothes, they "worked on the billiards table in Jimmy Wedge's flat". According to Foale, Wedge had his offices in Ganton Street and told them about a place round the corner in Marlborough Court with a low rent. Soon, they needed more space, so Wedge found space for them above him, and when he moved out, they took over 4 Ganton Street in its entirety.

== Photography ==
By 1970, Wedge and Booth both believed that the King's Road scene was over and Wedge moved into photography, as did Booth soon after. Wedge was already friendly with David Bailey and especially Terence Donovan, and was persuaded by Donovan's lifestyle – driving a Rolls-Royce, with a model on his arm – to change career in the late 1960s. Wedge had become friends with an actress who purchased her clothes from his Top Gear boutique, and she had bought her husband a camera that he did not want, so Wedge bought it from her.

For four years during the mid-1980s, Wedge lived together with actress Helen Mirren, as her boyfriend, and took a suite of erotic photographs with Mirren throughout their cohabitation. The pair had previously worked together during the 1970s, including a cover photo for the Observer magazine for 11 July 1971.
