= Foale =

Foale is a surname. Notable people with the surname include:

- Marion Foale (born 1939), English artist and fashion designer
  - Foale and Tuffin, an English fashion design business
- Michael Foale (born 1957), British-American astrophysicist and astronaut
