= Ganton Street =

Street in Soho, London

Coordinates: 51°30′47″N 0°8′20″W

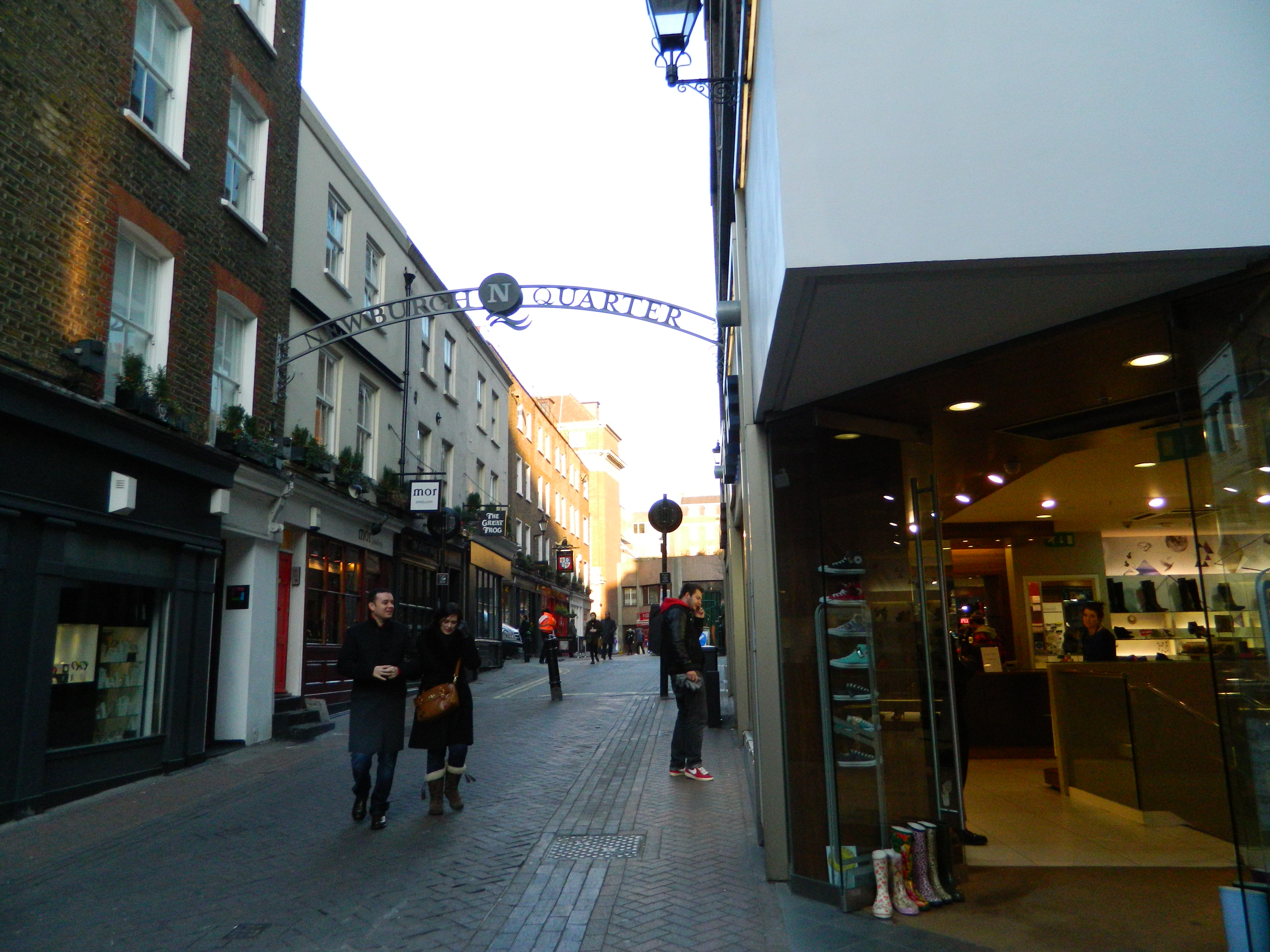
The corner of Carnaby Street and Ganton Street, looking east, showing typical shop and upper floor fronts for the area

Ganton Street is a street in central London that runs between Marshall Street and Kingly Street. It is crossed by Carnaby Street, and Newburgh Street joins it on its north side. The street is in a part-pedestrianised area dominated by independent clothing shops and restaurants, and on upper floors, offices, particularly media companies. Immediately to the east of Regent Street, Ganton Street is variously described as being in the West End, Soho, and "Carnaby" areas.

== History ==
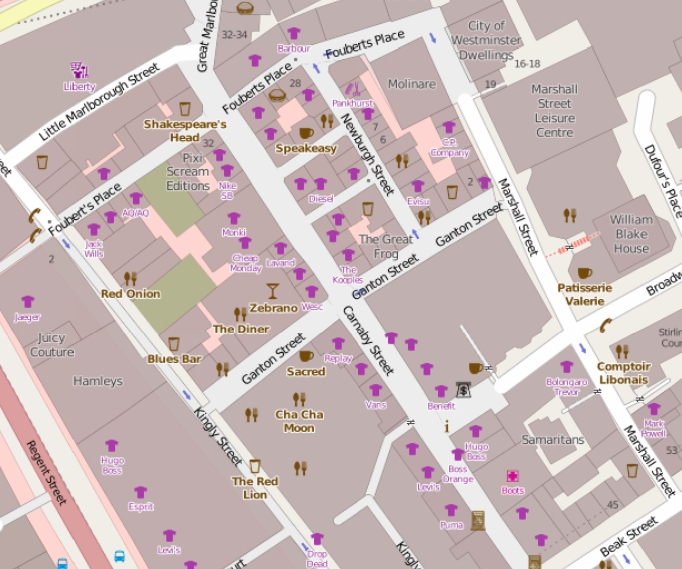
The immediate vicinity of Ganton Street

Ganton Street was formerly Cross Court and South Row.

== Listed buildings ==
Numbers 2 to 8, 10 and 12, and 24 are all listed buildings with English Heritage. Number 21 Carnaby Street, on the corner with Ganton Street, is also listed.

== Occupants ==
Property company and major London landlord Shaftesbury plc has acquired significant holdings in the Carnaby Street area and their registered office is at 22 Ganton Street.

Designer James Wedge had premises at 4 Ganton Street in about 1962. When Wedge moved out, designers Marion Foale and Sally Tuffin took over the building. Foale described the atmosphere at the time, before Carnaby Street began to swing, as follows: "People lived there, there was a dairy, a tobacconist, a newsagent – there was this little courtyard and everything … a proper village, though very run down."

Peter Small's clothes shop The Foundry was at 12 Ganton Street, a listed building, in the early 1980s. Boy George worked there as a window dresser and the shop sold the creations of Sue Clowes, which were worn by bands including Culture Club, The Cure, and Bananarama. The shop is now MOR Jewellery.

Cultural commentator Stephen Bayley has offices at 23 Ganton Street.

The Gold brothers' Lord John men's fashion chain had their first shop at 43 Carnaby Street, on the corner with Ganton Street, that featured a large mural painted by the pop art collective Binder, Edwards and Vaughan. Other work by the trio included Paul McCartney's piano and the car seen on the cover of The Kinks' Sunny Afternoon EP from 1966.

== Giant plug and socket ==
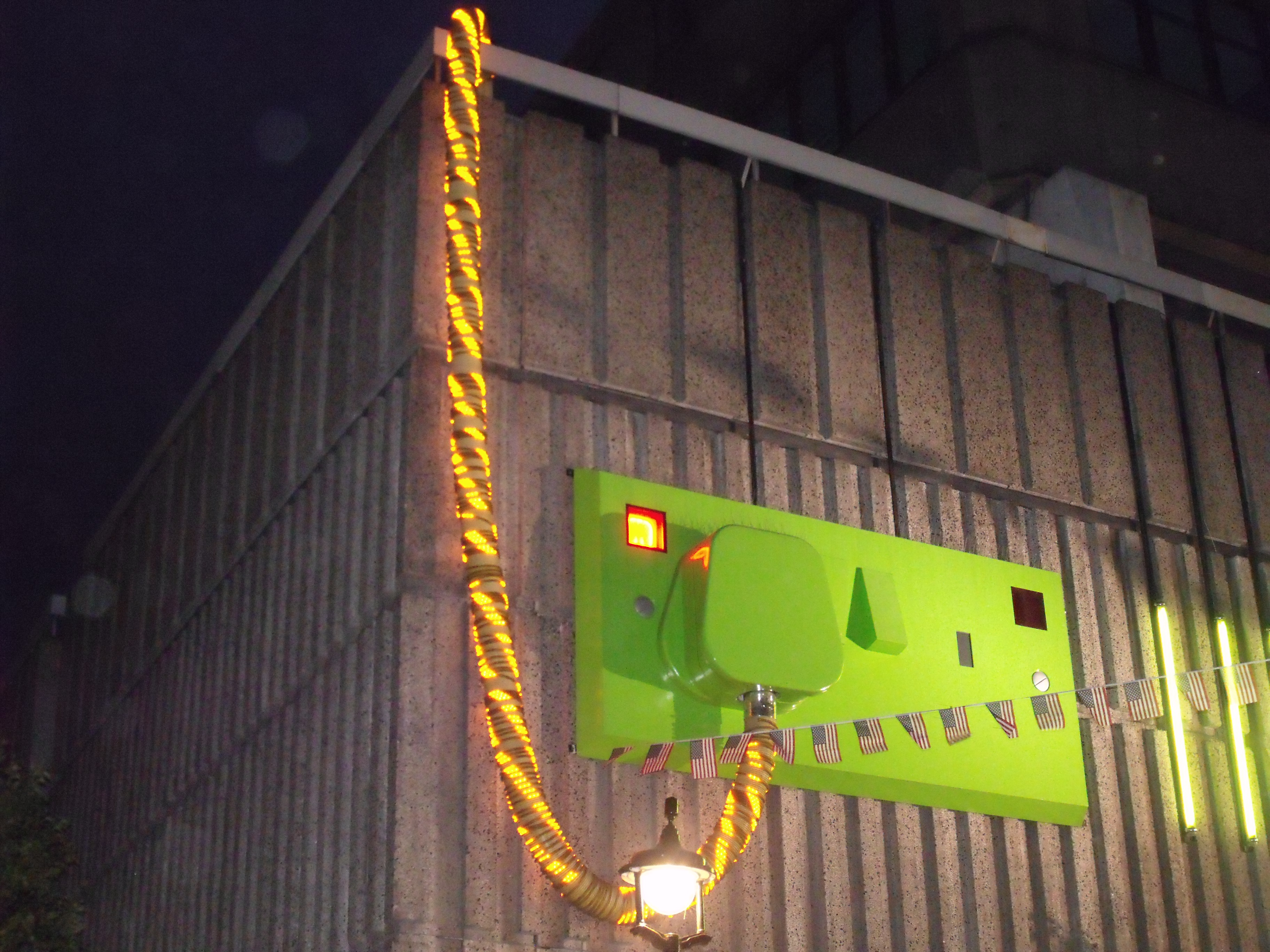
Plug and Socket, October 2009

An outsize plug and socket has been a feature of the façade of the electrical substation on the corner of Ganton Street and Marshall Street since 2001. Plug and Socket was installed by James Glancy Design as a piece of urban art to enliven an otherwise dull building. It has had a number of different designs over the years and the whole item, including the cable, lights up at night.
