= Gerald McCann (disambiguation) =

Gerald McCann is a Democratic Party politician and former mayor of Jersey City.

Gerald McCann may also refer to:

- Gerald McCann (fashion designer), British fashion designer active from the 1950s to 1990s
- Gerry McCann, father of Madeleine McCann
