= Rayne (shoe company) =

British footwear company

Rayne Shoes Limited
- Type: Private
- Industry: clothing accessories
- Predecessor: H. & M. Rayne
- Founded: 1899; 127 years ago in London, England
- Founder: Henry Rayne, Mary Rayne
- Defunct: 2003
- Fate: relaunched 2013, dissolved 2023
- Successor: Rayne Shoes Limited
- Headquarters: Fiesso d'Artico, Venice, Italy
- Key people: Luisella Anna Rayne, Nicholas Edward Rayne
- Products: Theatrical costumes; from 1920s shoes
- Website: www.rayneshoes.co.uk^{(Archived 16 July 2024)}

Rayne (also known as H. & M. Rayne) was a British manufacturer known for high-end and couture shoes. Founded in 1899 as a theatrical costumier, it diversified into fashion shoes in the 1920s.

Its biggest successes came when the grandson of the founders Edward Rayne took charge of the firm in 1952, with further international expansion and strong markets in the United States and France. His input to the brand ended in 1987, when Rayne was sold to David and Rosie Graham. The company ceased trading in 2003 but was relaunched in 2013 with designs created by Laurence Dacade.

Rayne was holder of a Royal Warrant to Queen Mary, Queen Mother, and Elizabeth II, also supplying the shoes worn by Elizabeth II, Princess Margaret, and Princess Anne on their wedding days. It created the shoes worn by Elizabeth Taylor in the film Cleopatra, as well as supplying footwear to many other film stars, from Marlene Dietrich to Brigitte Bardot.

== Company history ==
H. & M Rayne was founded in 1889 as a theatrical costumier by Henry and Mary Rayne and located close to The Old Vic in Lambeth. Early clients included Ballets Russes, Anna Pavlova and Vaslav Nijinsky. Its reputation earned it clients across society – it made shoes for actress and Edward VII's mistress Lillie Langtry; later it made shoes for Queen Mary, who awarded the company the first of its three Royal Warrants.

Henry and Mary Rayne's son Joseph inherited the shoe side of the business and opened a store at 58 New Bond Street in 1920, capitalising on the trend for shoes as a fashion item. However, initially it was still known as a theatrical costumier – a December 1920 report in The Times detailed how goods to the value of approximately £479 had been stolen from the theatrical store's Bond Street premises, comprising two pairs of 'dandy' shoes, one pair of bronze shoes, paste buckles and 204 pairs of women's silk stockings. During this era, it also had a store at 15 Rupert Street, just off Shaftesbury Avenue.

By 1928 the company had become a PLC. Its retail activities were highlighted in a 1929 report to shareholders, with the company noting that its retail presence via its own stores helped to maintain even output in manufacturing, overcoming the traditional footwear-market problem of fixed 'seasons' followed by downturns in wholesale trade. In 1936 – during the height of the Depression – the company sought to raise additional share capital in order to fund expansion of manufacturing capacity and capitalize on an agreement with Delman of New York. In 1951, the shareholders' meeting reported increased profits of £72,070, despite difficult world trading conditions and rumours of a proposed reduction in UK purchase tax.

=== Change of leadership ===
Joseph Rayne died in 1952 and his son Edward became chairman of the family firm at the age of 29. He had inherited a successful company with a healthy balance sheet that was very much part of the British society dress code. A pair of flat pumps with a bow originally designed for the actress Gertrude Lawrence had remained the company's bestselling line for 50 years, worn by society and theatricals alike. The company was active as an exporter – its shoes were sold to 12 countries – and had high-profile clients such as Vivien Leigh, Ava Gardner and Rita Hayworth who were paying up to £40 for a pair of Rayne shoes.

Although Edward Rayne was young, he had been schooled in shoemaking from the age of 16. Excluded from war service because of his poor eyesight, he had undertaken a long apprenticeship at H. & M. Rayne's factory in King's Cross. Rayne was able to capitalise on that existing foothold and a decade after he took over the firm he established a joint venture with US shoe firm Delman, giving Rayne a presence in New York's Fifth Avenue. This link capitalised on the strong relationship that had begun between the two companies in the 1930s; Rayne's 1954 review to shareholders noted that the company's three shops, Rayne and Delman in Bond Street and Rayne in Regent Street had produced record profits.

== 1960s developments ==
Edward Rayne expanded the Rayne business in the early 1960s, beginning an association with Genesco in the United States and also buying a 49 per cent stake in the British company of John Plant and its subsidiary Butlers.

Stage designer Oliver Messel was enlisted to create the interior of the new Delman-branded store for H. & M. Rayne in Bond Street in 1960. As Alison Settle noted, whereas upmarket shoe stores had been discreet enclaves dressed with curtains and pot plants – with shoes consigned to underground stores – this refit incorporated display stands and cases, some of them illuminated, to show off hundreds of pairs of shoes. Her article in The Observer said: "Mr Messel and Mr Rayne are at one in thinking that shoes to buy should be as easy to see and handle as books in a library". The Rayne brand's reputation for supplying shoes to royalty continued; at the marriage of Princess Margaret to Messel's nephew Antony Armstrong-Jones in 1960, the senior female royal party (Queen Mother, Queen, Princess Margaret) were all clad in Rayne shoes.

By 1960, the shoes designed by Roger Vivier for Dior were made at Rayne's UK factory and personally supervised by Edward Rayne. Four years later, Vivier began selling Rayne brand shoes in his Rue François store in Paris. The company also stayed in tune with mainstream direction of fashion – Mary Quant shoes were first displayed in its flagship store. The company also retained a stake in the mass market, with an interest in both H.E. Randall and Lotus chainstores. By 1966, Rayne was showcasing what were known as 'Young Design quartet' – Jean Muir, Roger Nelson, Moya Bowler and Gerald McCann – capitalising on London's thirst for younger designers by getting them to design fashionable shoes in a more affordable price bracket, with designs being sold in Harrods and some high-street shoe shops. Rayne also maintained a strong foothold in the couture end of shoe production – indeed his role as chair of the Incorporated Society of London Fashion Designers from 1960 meant his shoes were shown as part of the twice annual fashion events held by the society. He also enlisted designers such as Norman Hartnell to create shoes for Rayne.

== 1970s and closure ==
By 1970, Rayne shoes were included in the Molyneux collection – with The Guardian reporting that it was thought to be the first time a French couture house had used branded British shoes. In autumn of that year, Rayne opened its own store in Paris – said to be the first shoemaker to do so since Lobb. Rayne was also designing shoes for other French designers, including Nina Ricci and Lanvin, while in the UK it had recruited designers such as Bill Gibb.

In 1975, Rayne was sold to the department-store chain Debenhams. Edward Rayne joined the boards of Debenhams and Harvey Nichols. Debenhams was sold to Burton Group in 1985, and two years later Rayne was acquired by the businessman David Graham and his wife Rose. The company ceased trading in 2003.

The contribution of H. & M. Rayne – especially under Edward Rayne's leadership – was showcased in an exhibition held at the Fashion and Textile Museum in 2015. Rayne shoes are held in several archives, including the Metropolitan Museum in New York and the Victoria and Albert Museum in London.

== Relaunch effort ==
The company was relaunched in 2013 with designs created by Laurence Dacade although all shoe manufacturing was now done in Italy. Ducade was succeeded by Ernesto Esposito in 2016. In 2019 the company was granted a royal warrant by Queen Elizabeth II. The relaunch effort, however, could not be sustained and the Autumn/Winter 2022 collection was its last. The company applied for dissolution in August 2023 and was formally struck off the company registry in November.
