= Madge Garland =

- Garland, by Man Ray, c. 1927
- Born: Madge McHarg; 12 June 1898; Melbourne, Australia
- Died: 15 July 1990 (aged 92); London, England
- Other name: Lady Ashton
- Occupations: Fashion academic; fashion editor and advisor; author

Madge Garland (née McHarg; 12 June 1898 – 15 July 1990) was an influential figure in the British fashion scene, who made her name as a fashion journalist and editor working for, among others, Vogue and Women's Wear Daily.

From journalism, she moved into a business role during wartime, later advising the British fashion industry and helping to form the London Fashion Group – a forerunner to the British Fashion Council.

In 1948, she founded the first fashion course at the Royal College of Art, helping to develop a rigorous academic framework with a strong industry focus. Robert O'Byrne described Garland as among the female pioneers who: "battled to have fashion design taken more seriously, in particular fighting for academic acknowledgment".

Garland's obituary in The Times noted: "She was no society featherhead, but a key figure in the history of British fashion journalism, the British fashion industry and the training of fashion designers."

== Early life and career ==
Madge McHarg was born in Melbourne, Australia and was the third child of Andrew McHarg and Henrietta Maria Aitkin. Her father was an international shipper who exported to Australia and she had a peripatetic childhood, growing up in St John's Wood, London and attending the International School in Paris from 1912.

It was in Paris that her lifelong interest in fashion, art and literature was developed, however her parents prevented her from taking up a university place at Cambridge and she left home at 21, beginning her career as an errand girl on Fleet Street. This was considered very unusual for the times for a 'lady', especially as Garland was living independently in a boarding house in Earl's Court.

== Move to Vogue ==
In 1922, she began assisting at Vogue UK, just after the arrival of its second editor Dorothy Todd, who was shifting the magazine's focus away from society and towards the arts, featuring articles by Clive Bell, Aldous Huxley and Virginia Woolf. Initially, Garland was a receptionist and teagirl, also teaching herself to type. She was married briefly during this period to Captain Ewart Garland but retained the name McHarg until Gertrude Jekyll told her it was dreadful and asked if she had another. From then on, she adopted her former husband's name.

Describing how she got started, she said: "I don't want to sound snobbish, but I wore extremely good and fashionable clothes...I remember Aldous Huxley saying: 'Are you dressed like that because you are on Vogue or are you on Vogue because you are dressed like that?'". This same talent for looking the part gained Garland access straight into the drawing room of Elizabeth Bowes-Lyon – then about to announce her engagement to the Duke of York – to deliver some photographic proofs from Vogue; Garland had taken the precaution of arriving by taxi in a Bergdorf Goodman coat. Over time, she became the protégé of Todd and the two also developed a relationship and shared a flat. It appears their love affair was widely recognised in some circles as it inspired a parody of Thomas Edward Brown's poem The Garden, which ran: 'A Garland is a lovesome thing, Todd wot'.

During this time, Garland developed both her journalism skills and connections with leading writers and artists of the day, such as Rebecca West and Ivy Compton-Burnett – also advising Virginia Woolf on what to wear. Woolf recounted in her diary a dinner party at Todd and Garland's flat in Royal Hospital Road, Chelsea, also attended by West, in which Todd wore sponge bag trousers and Garland wore pearls and silk. Many years later (in response to Garland's obituary), the author Nesta Macdonald reported on another party co-hosted by Garland and held at her flat in Royal Hospital Road in 1927. A fan of the Diaghilev Ballet (Ballets Russes), which had just revived Les Matelots, this was a fancy dress party with guests required to dress in nautical costumes. Among those attending were Lytton Strachey and Tallulah Bankhead.

She introduced Cecil Beaton to Vogue and was photographed by him in 1927 – the photograph is now in the collection of the National Portrait Gallery. Man Ray – who also photographed Garland – and George Hoyningen-Huene were also among Garland's friends and she brought them into the magazine.

Todd's tenure as Vogue editor lasted four years, but the magazine was losing money and its owner Condé Nast disliked the literary approach. The publisher sacked Todd, who threatened to sue; Condé Nast in return threatened to expose her 'morals'. Garland left with her, becoming a successful freelance writer. She contributed to the influential US fashion trade title Womenswear Daily, as well as writing the women's section of Illustrated London News between 1928 and 1932 and contributing to Eve and Britannia magazines.

Garland returned to Vogue in 1932 as fashion editor, and remained involved with the magazine for the next nine years. She would travel to Paris to report on couture fashions by names such as Lucien Lelong and Jacques Fath, staying at the Ritz and taking advantage of the opportunity to buy sale-price items from Schiaparelli and Chanel – she had a mannequin's figure.

== Fashion industry role ==
During the war, Garland began working for the London department store Bourne & Hollingsworth and was regarded as an excellent businesswoman. She took charge of merchandising and also did some designing herself. She also commissioned Hardy Amies to produce garments when he was on leave from the Special Operations Executive.

She began advising the fashion industry, notably helping to form the London Fashion Group, comprising Norman Hartnell, Peter Russell, Victor Stiebel and Edward Molyneux – all of whom were members of the Incorporated Society of London Fashion Designers.

In this advisory capacity, she went on a government-backed trip to Paris in 1947 (working with the Council for Industrial Design) to buy New Look accessories (gloves, shoes, underwear) that could then be copied by the UK fashion industry. She was armed with £1,000 to make the purchases. She also visited the United States to explore the ready-to-wear industry and its marketing methods.

== Academic appointment ==
In 1947, Garland was invited to become the first professor of fashion at the Royal College of Art by Robin Darwin, taking up the role a year later. As her Times obituary notes, she had to effectively invent the course – creating an academic framework that would serve the industry. As most of the available art teachers didn't have the required background, Garland brought in teachers from industry, notably cutters from the fashion trade, also liaising with the Manchester textile industry to source materials and designs.

Interviewed in 1972, she recalled how much of a struggle it was to convince the powers that be that her decision was right: "there was an awful row with the Department of Education. But I wanted people from the trade – trade was a dreadful word to use in connection with art. So I formed a committee of very high powered people from industry and drew teachers from the trade...I got the trade to serve on the committee and to give bursaries and do competitions and to take students for a period in the vacations to work in their businesses. I tried so hard to marry art and industry – previously there had been no contact, the principals of the art colleges had never been inside a fashion house, they were grey haired and well meaning in those sort of Fairisle smocks."

In an interview for the Victoria and Albert Museum, one of her students Gerald McCann – later to have a long and successful career in the United States as well as Britain – recalled her strong links to industry. He would begin working for Marks & Spencer even before he graduated. Other influential designers trained by Garland included Gina Fratini and David Sassoon. She is also said to have inspired Hardy Amies to set up his first fashion enterprise.

Although Garland had created the framework that would train so many post-war designers, she has been, according to the Royal College of Art, somewhat neglected as a figure in the history of fashion. She left the RCA after its first full graduation show in 1956 and was succeeded by Janey Ironside. Her resignation was reported in the papers, with Garland expressing the view that, after eight years in academia it was time for a change. The Times noted: "one of her most important achievements has been to bring both to students and manufacturers the understanding that fashion design is not by any means restricted to haute couture and to the creation of ball gowns requiring a hundred yards of tulle and a box of sequins".

== Later life and career ==
Garland continued to act as an advisor to industry, working with Terylene and knitwear manufacturers. She was the author/co-author of several books, including The Changing Face of Beauty (1957), The Changing Face of Fashion (1970) and A History of Fashion (1975).

A founder member of the Contemporary Art Society, she was herself the subject of portraits by notable artists, including one by Marie Laurencin that she owned, and another by Edward Wolfe that now hangs in the Museum of the Home formerly the Geffrye Museum.

She was cared for in her later years in a convent but would use friends' houses to host parties. She remained close to Rebecca West and Ivy Compton-Burnett and friends continued to consult her about what to wear – she accompanied Rebecca West, then aged 87, in search of a mink coat. In an interview for The Observer in 1986, Garland recounted how Compton-Burnett had such implicit trust in her judgement that once sent her off to buy a diamond brooch to go with a new black dress, with Garland duly returning to the flat with three uninsured pieces on trial from a jeweller friend in Bond Street. She also had a friendship with Vita Sackville-West – who would lay on enormous teas at Sissinghurst followed by tours of the gardens.

== Personal life ==
Garland's private life was shrouded in secrecy during her lifetime and subject to some scandal. Lisa Cohen's 2012 book All We Know: Three Lives describes Garland and Todd as life partners. Their relationship is said to have inspired Frederick Ashton's first short ballet A Tragedy of Fashion.

Garland's earlier brief marriage – described as an escape – was to an admirer named Ewart Garland. Years later she would recount sending him a telegram from a hospital bed asking him to come and marry her immediately.

In 1953, she married Sir Leigh Ashton, an old friend and director of the Victoria and Albert Museum. This has been described as a marriage of convenience, as Ashton was also gay. The marriage was over after a year, but the couple did not divorce until 1962. The union was childless. Garland retained the name Lady Ashton for formal purposes.

Garland may have had multiple other relationships with women throughout her life. These included English novelist Ivy Compton-Burnett, photographer and model Lee Miller, and one of Britain's first female solicitors, Frances Blackett Gill.
