= Virginia Ironside =

British journalist (born 1944)

- Born: 3 February 1944 (age 82); London, England
- Occupations: Journalist, author
- Parents: Christopher Ironside; Janey Ironside
- Website: virginiaironside.org

Virginia Ironside (born 3 February 1944) is a British journalist, agony aunt and author. Born in London, she is the daughter of Christopher Ironside, painter and coin designer, and Janey Ironside who was the first professor of fashion design at the Royal College of Art. She is the niece of the painter and designer Robin Ironside.

== Education ==
Ironside attended Miss Ironside's School in Kensington, where her great-aunt was headmistress.

== Career ==
Ironside writes a column, "Dilemmas", for The Independent, an agony column for the Idler, and a monthly column for The Oldie. Her first book, Chelsea Bird, was published when she was 19. During the 1960s she wrote a rock music column for the Daily Mail newspaper. She is an Honorary Associate of the National Secular Society.

== Comments about abortion ==
Ironside received attention after her appearance on BBC One's religious discussion programme, Sunday Morning Live, in 2010. She stated "If a baby's going to be born severely disabled or totally unwanted, surely an abortion is the act of a loving mother" and added "If I were the mother of a suffering child – I mean a deeply suffering child – I would be the first to want to put a pillow over its face... If it was a child I really loved, who was in agony, I think any good mother would." Though some viewers supported Ironside, many complaints were registered on the programme's website message board.

== My Death My Decision ==
Ironside is a patron of the right-to-die organisation My Death, My Decision, a UK-based campaign group that advocates for changes to the law to allow medically assisted dying for people who meet specified criteria and request it.

== Works ==
- Chelsea Bird (1964)
- Distant Sunset (1982)
- Made for Each Other (1985)
- How to Have a Baby and Stay Sane (1989)
- Roseanne and the Magic Mirror (1993)
- The Subfertility Handbook (Overcoming Common Problems) (1995)
- You’ll Get Over It: The Rage of Bereavement (1997)
- Problems! Problems!: Confessions of an Agony Aunt (1998)
- Goodbye, Dear Friend: Coming to Terms with the Death of a Pet (1998)
- Janey and Me: Growing Up with My Mother (2003)
- The Huge Bag of Worries (1996)
- No! I Don’t Want to Join a Bookclub (2007)
- The Virginia Monologues – 20 Reasons Why Growing Old is Great (2009)
- No, I Don’t Need Reading Glasses (2013)
- Yes, I Can Manage, Thank You (2015)
- No Thanks, I’m Quite Happy Standing (2016)
- Flora McDonnell, ed., Threads of Hope: Learning to Live with Depression (Short Books, 2003, ISBN 978-1-904095-35-4), with contributions by Margaret Drabble, Wendy Cope, Andrew Solomon, Virginia Ironside, Lewis Wolpert, Alastair Campbell, and Kay Redfield Jamison.
