= Janey Ironside =

British professor of fashion

- Janey Ironside on the cover of Janey & Me by her daughter Virginia Ironside
- Born: Janey Acheson; 1919
- Died: 6 April 1979 (aged 59–60)
- Education: Central School of Arts & Crafts
- Occupation: Professor
- Spouse: Christopher Ironside (m. 1939; div. 1961)
- Children: 1, Virginia

Janey Ironside (1919 – 6 April 1979) was a British academic who was professor of fashion at London's Royal College of Art, a position she held from 1956 to 1968. She was a key figure in enabling fashion to be accepted as a valid academic subject in Britain. Described by her daughter Virginia as a "style icon", she died aged 60 after several suicide attempts and having suffered medical complications caused by alcoholism.

== Early life and career ==
Janey Ironside was born Janey Acheson. Her father was an important figure in the Indian Civil Service. She was sent to school in Winchester, England. This was followed by courses in dress making at the Central School of Arts & Crafts in London in the 1930s.

During World War Two, Ironside lived in Leamington Spa and would visit evacuees recovering in a nearby convalescent home. She produced over forty pencil and watercolour studies of the children in the home and a number of these works were presented to the Imperial War Museum in 1981. She advertised her services as a "designer dressmaker" in Vogue and her customers included debutants and fashion editors. Her work was mainly made-to-order evening wear and wedding dresses, but by 1952 she had designed a full collection for a large retailer.

In 1949, Ironside taught at the private Fashion School in Ennismore Gardens, Kensington, next to the Royal College of Art.

== Style ==
Ironside's personal style was based on Christian Dior's maxim that "to please a man, or to stop a show, use black, white and scarlet." She wore mainly dark colours with red lipstick, which set off her pale skin and dark hair. Her fashions were influenced by Paris and Dior's New Look but on the cheap using the materials she could find. Due to post World War II rationing she bought material intended for blackout curtains to make outfits.

== Royal College of Art ==
In 1956, at Robin Darwin's urging, Ironside was appointed as the Royal College of Art's professor of fashion, a post she was to hold until 1968. She replaced Madge Garland, whose assistant she had once been, in the post. The appointment came just as British fashion was about to enter its "youthquake" phase. According to Elizabeth Wilson, Ironside attributed this phenomenon to a combination of British eccentricity and the Welfare State and educational grants which allowed people with talent that would once have been wasted to go to college. Angela McRobbie described Ironside, along with Muriel Pemberton, as the key figures in enabling fashion to attain academic respectability in Britain.

Ironside's students included Bill Gibb, Ossie Clark, Zandra Rhodes, Moya Bowler, Janice Wainwright, Sally Tuffin and Marion Foale. She introduced a menswear course and was laughed at when she said she thought Mick Jagger stylish. Antony Price, a student on the menswear course, went on to create the suited look favoured by Bryan Ferry and others. When the College was given the power to award degrees, however, her School of Fashion was excluded. After Ironside lost her post in 1968, according to her daughter in her book Janey and Me, there followed a downward spiral of alcohol abuse and depression.

In 1968, Ironside produced A Fashion Alphabet which was notable for its pithy aphorisms, such as "necklines always make headlines." More seriously, the book expounded Ironside's view that "fashion in clothing is one of the great living arts of civilisation", listing 49 types of collars and 22 types of sleeves for instance.

== Personal life ==
In 1939, she married Christopher Ironside (1913–1992), the artist and coin designer. They had one daughter, the journalist and novelist Virginia Ironside (born 1944). The marriage was dissolved in 1961, and he remarried later that year. She wrote an autobiography Janey which The Times described as illuminating "a great deal more than the world of fashion".

== Death ==
Ironside made several suicide attempts and suffered serious medical complications from alcoholism including cirrhosis of the liver. When she eventually died on 6 April 1979, it was November before a short obituary appeared in The Times. It paid tribute to her eye for colour, her skills as an educator and her "green thumb" which allowed her students to flourish, but made no mention of the later, troubled, period of her life.

== Selected publications ==
- Fashion as a Career. Museum Press, London, 1962.
- Fashion from Ancient Egypt to the Present. Hamlyn, London, 1965. (Introduction)
- A Fashion Alphabet. Michael Joseph, London, 1968.
- Janey: An Autobiography. Michael Joseph, London, 1973.
