= Christopher Ironside =

English painter and coin designer

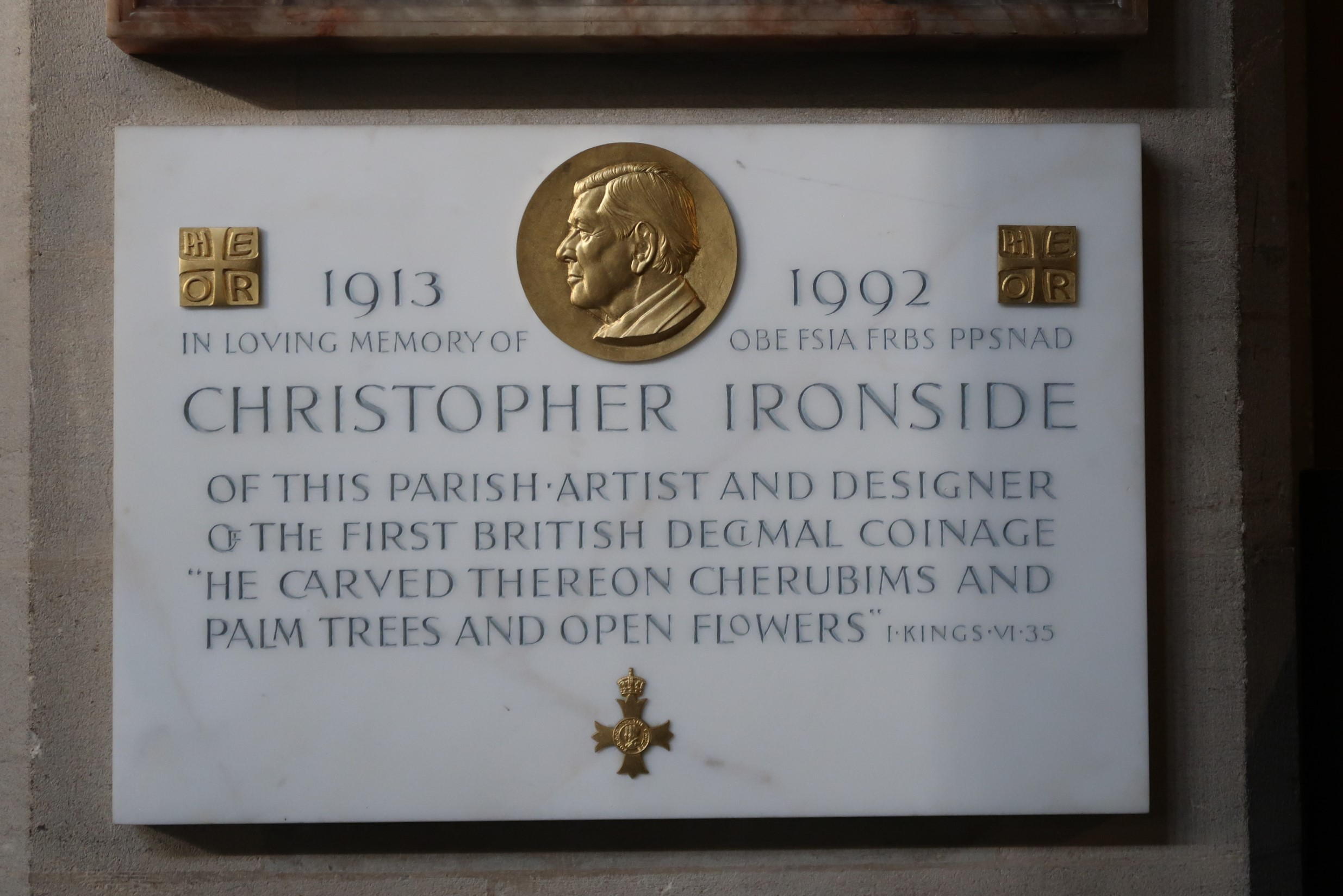
Christopher Ironside – memorial in St Mary Abbots Church, Kensington, London – photographed in February 2023

Christopher Ironside OBE, FRBS (11 July 1913 – 13 July 1992) was a British painter and coin designer, particularly known for the reverse sides of the new British coins issued on decimalisation in 1971.

== Life and career ==
Ironside began his career as a painter, studying at the Central School of Arts and Crafts. During World War II he served in the Directorate of Camouflage, working for the Air Ministry in Leamington Spa.

After the war he worked for the Ministry of Town and Country Planning, as Education Officer for the Council of Industrial Design, but gave up the post in 1948 due to increasing design commissions. His subsequent known work included: 1951 design contributions to the Festival of Britain, South Bank Exhibition; 1952 ballet stage and costume design with his brother for Sylvia, the revival production choreographed by Sir Frederick Ashton, first choreographed by Louis Merante to music by Leo Delibes in 1876; 1953 design for Pall Mall for the coronation of Elizabeth II; 1964 he collaborated with his brother Robin on the Shakespeare commemoration issue of stamps and first day covers. He taught part-time at the Royal College of Art from 1953 to 1963. His paintings were exhibited at two main shows, shared with his elder brother Robin, at the Redfern Gallery in 1944 and at Arthur Jeffress in 1960. He received an OBE in 1971.

Ironside designed various coins for the Royal Mint, including the reverse of the pre-2008 British 50 pence, ten pence, five pence, two pence, and one penny coins, as well as the former half penny coin. He designed coins for the Isle of Man, Singapore, Tanzania, Brunei, Qatar and Dubai. He designed commemorative medallions including: the Britannia Commemorative Society's Medallion No.7 "The Spanish Armada" and No.42 "The Royal Navy"; the medal for the 1974 Centenary of Sir Winston Churchill's birth "This was Their Finest Hour"; the brass relief memorial for the Earl and Countess Mountbatten in Westminster Abbey; and, the brass relief for the 16th Duke of Norfolk in Arundel Castle (Fitzalan Chapel).

In 2013 the Royal Mint issued a 50 pence coin with one of his designs on the reverse to commemorate the 100th anniversary of his birth.

His collection of earlier concept sketches, plaster moulds and submission entries for the decimalisation competition are now housed in the British Museum.

He was married twice: to Janey Acheson (one daughter, the journalist and novelist Virginia Ironside); and, after that marriage was dissolved in 1961, to Jean Marsden (two daughters and one son). His aunt was Irene Ironside, the founder and headmistress of Miss Ironside's School For Girls on Elvaston Place, Kensington, where his daughter Virginia attended for free.

== Coins ==
=== Bahrain (1965) ===
In the beginning of the 1960s, there was a proposal by the Royal Mint Advisory Committee for a joint currency for Bahrain, Qatar, Abu Dhabi and Dubai. The committee had at this stage appointed Christopher Ironside on a term contract and asked him to provide prototype designs for these coins. Three sets were prepared and presented, the first set depicted each denomination within its own geometric Arabic design which was favoured by the committee; the second set, which was a thematic set depicting a goitred gazelle (Arabian gazelle now extinct), a peregrine falcon, a local fish, a mosque, an Arab dhow, oil derricks, and a date palm; and, a third set of Arabic designs. A file note, dated 24 February 1966, says: "The project for a common Gulf currency looks like being shelved for the time being and instead Qatar and Dubai are aiming to issue a joint currency in the near future."

The designs that were presented in the three sets were labelled as "Designs for Arabian Gulf coins", but were never taken further.

=== Tanzania (1966) ===
After World War I, the territory of Tanganyika became a mandate territory of the United Kingdom and its monetary system was aligned to that of Kenya and Uganda, through the establishment of the East African Currency Board (EACB) in December 1919. Following independence, the decision to dissolve the EACB and to establish separate Central Banks in Tanzania, Kenya, and Uganda, the Bank of Tanzania Act, 1965, was passed by the National Assembly in December 1965, and the Bank was opened by the first President of Tanzania, Mwalimu Julius K. Nyerere, on 14 June 1966.

Tanzania's first set of coins was issued in 1966, with a portrait of J. K. Nyerere on the obverse and African wildlife animals on the reverse. This set included circulation and commemorative sets. The last circulation coins with this first portrait were dated 1984. All regular types with this portrait have the word "TANZANIA" and the date above the portrait and the Swahili words "RAIS WA KWANZA" (roughly meaning "First President") below. Both the obverse and reverse were designed by Christopher Ironside. (Note: The British Museum, The Christopher Ironside Collection; Objects: Pencil drawn sketches.)

Description

- 5, 10, 20 and 50 Senti; 1 and 5 Shilingi denominations (1966; circulation up to cir. 1984).

These coins were struck as:

- 5 senti in bronze, 4g, 22,5mm dia. 1966–1984 (170 Million coins minted), dodecagonal (12-sided). Design: Sailfish.
- 10 senti in nickel-brass, 5g, 25mm dia. 1977–1984 (48M), scalloped. Design: Running zebra.
- 20 senti in nickel-brass, 5g, 24mm dia. 1966–1984 (100M), round. Design: Running ostrich.
- 50 senti in copper-nickel, 4g, 21mm dia. 1966–1984 (56M); nickel-clad steel 1988–1990 (10M). Design: Bush rabbit.
- 1 Shilingi in copper-nickel, 8g, 27,5mm dia. 1966–1984 (118M); nickel-clad steel 1987–1992 (slight change to design) (15M). Design: Outstretched arm holding a flaming torch.
- 5 Shilingi in copper-nickel, 13g, 31mm dia. 1971– 1980 (19M), decagonal. Design: Value centre with four cell containing designs of crops and a resting bull.

=== Qatar and Dubai (1966) ===
In the beginning of the 1960s, there was a proposal by the Royal Mint Advisory Committee for a joint currency for Qatar and Dubai (the remaining Trucial States). The committee had at this stage appointed Christopher Ironside on a term contract and asked him to provide prototype designs for these coins. Three sets were prepared and presented, the first set depicted each denomination within its own geometric Arabic design which was favoured by the committee; the second set, which was a thematic set depicting a goitred gazelle (an Arabian gazelle now extinct), a peregrine falcon, a local fish, a mosque, an Arab dhow, oil derricks, and a date palm; and a third set of Arabic designs. (Note: A file note, dated 24 February 1966, says: "The project for a common Gulf currency looks like being shelved for the time being and instead Qatar and Dubai are aiming to issue a joint currency in the near future.")

In the mid-1960s Qatar and Dubai entered a currency union and organised the design and production of their own coin set. This joint currency was issued in 1966. The country names and denominations appear on the obverse, whilst a relatively simple design of a goitred gazelle adorns the reverse of all the coins (originally destined for the common currency to be used by Arab states of the Persian Gulf). The obverse and reverse of the coins were designed by Christopher Ironside. (Note: The British Museum: The Christopher Ironside Collection: Object: Block with mounted copies of suggested designs for Arabian Gulf currency, Series A. (obverse) block with twelve photographs of designs for the obverse of Arabian Gulf currency. Ornamental patterns at centre. Arabic script and numerals around the edges of the coins.; Object: Pencil drawn sketch of a design for a 25 Dirham coin, (obverse) the English inscription is around the edge with the central inscription in Arabic; (reverse) the inscription is around the edge with an image of a goitred gazelle in the centre seen side on facing right.; Object: Block with mounted copies of suggested designs for Arabian Gulf currency, Series B. (obverse) block with eleven photographs of designs for the reverse of Arabian Gulf currency. Pencil and pen annotations. Ornamental patterns with value at centre. Arabic script around the edges of the coins.; Object: Block with mounted copies of suggested designs for Arabian Gulf currency, Series C. (obverse) block with fifteen photographs of designs for the reverse of Arabian Gulf currency. Pencil annotations. Designs with oil refinery, eagle, gazelle, fish, palm tree, mosque or dhow at centre. Arabic script around the edges of the coins.)

Description

- 1, 5, 10, 25 and 50 Dirhams (A. 1386–1389/ AD.1966 – 1969); Qatar and Dubai.

These coins were struck as:

- 1 Dirham in bronze, 1,5g, 15mm dia. 1966–1969 Ahmad II period (1966, 1 Million coins minted). Design: Gazelle on the reverse, value on obverse.
- 2 Dirhams in bronze, 3,75g, 22mm dia. 1966–1969 (4M). Design: as above.
- 5 Dirhams in bronze, 3,75g, 22mm dia. 1966–1969 (4M). Design: as above.
- 10 Dirhams in bronze, 3,75g, 22mm dia. 1966–1971 (2M). Design: as above.
- 25 Dirhams in copper-nickel, 3,5g, 20mm dia. 1966–1969 (4M). Design: as above.
- 50 Dirhams in copper-nickel, 6,5g, 25mm dia. 1966–1969 (2M). Design: as above.

A total of 17 million coins were minted (individual mintage, in millions of coins, indicated in brackets above).

=== Brunei (1967) ===
The Brunei Currency Board was established in 1967 and introduced the Brunei dollar as the new currency of Brunei, replacing the Malaya and British Borneo dollar after the Currency Union Agreement between Malaysia, Singapore and Brunei was terminated and all three countries issued their own currencies. The Brunei dollar was divided into 100 cents (or sen in Malay), with a portrait of Sultan Omar Ali Saifuddien III on the obverse. The reverses of the coins were designed by Christopher Ironside. (Note: The British Museum, The Christopher Ironside Collection: object: pencil drawn sketches of designs for the obverse and the reverse of coins from Brunei.)

Description

- 1, 5, 10, 20, 50 sen and dollar denominations.

These coins were struck as:

- 1 sen in copper-plated zinc, 1g, 17mm dia. (18,5M). Reverse design: representation of flower or blossom.
- 5 sen in Aluminium, 2g, 16mm dia. (25,5M). Reverse design: representation of a bird in flight.
- 10 sen in cupro-nickel, 2g, 19mm dia. (45M). Reverse design: representation of a land animal.
- 20 sen in cupro-nickel, 4g, 23mm dia. (32M). Reverse design: representation of a tree.
- 50 sen in cupro-nickel, 7g, 27mm dia.(13M). Reverse design: coat of arms.
- A 10 dollar coin bearing a portrait of Sultan Omar Ali Saifuddin III on the obverse, and dollar signs on the reverse was prepared by Ironside but was never taken into production.

=== Jamaica (1969) ===
In 1968, the House of Representatives unanimously approved the report of the Select Committee of the House, which recommended that the currency of Jamaica should be decimalized in 1969. The introduction of a decimal currency provided the opportunity for the introduction of a complete Jamaican coinage as formerly, the coins (with the exception of the penny and halfpenny), were the same as those used in the United Kingdom. With regard to the design, it was decided that the portrait of the ruling British monarch, which had appeared on the obverse of all coins, would be replaced by the Jamaican coat of arms, with national symbols on the reverse depicting aspects of the island's flora and fauna, images that reflect the ideals of the newly independent country. The reverse of the decimal coinage was designed by Christopher Ironside. (Note: British Museum, The Christopher Ironside Collection: object: pencil drawn sketch of a design for the reverse of a 10-dollar coin from Jamaica (Item 143).)

Description

- 1, 5, 10, 20 and 25 penny/cent denominations

These coins were struck as:

- 1 cent in bronze, 4g, 21mm dia. 1969–1974 ( 65Million coins minted); Aluminium 1975–2002 (108M), only proofs cast after 1987. Design: Ackee fruit, the national fruit.
- 5 cent in copper-nickel, 2.8g, 20mm dia. 1969–1989 (82M); nickel-plated steel 1990–1993. Design: American crocodile.
- 10 cent in copper-nickel, 5.75g, 23,5mm dia. 1969–1989 (145M). Design: Butterfly within leafy sprigs of the lignum vitae, the national flower.
- 20 cents in copper-nickel, 11g, 29mm dia. 1969–1990 (18M). Design: the national tree, blue mahoe.
- 25 cent in copper-nickel, 14.5g, 32mm dia. 1969-1894 (20M). Design used for 25th Bank of Jamaica Anniversary. Design: National bird, the swallow-tailed humming bird retrieving nectar from a flower
- 50 cents (introduced 1976; ceased circulation 1989); 1, 5, 10 & 20 dollar coins (by other designers).
- ½ penny denomination used up to 1969; coat of arms on the reverse, designer Percy Metcalfe.

=== Food and Agriculture Organization of the United Nations (1970) ===
In the 1970s the Food and Agriculture Organization of the United Nations initiated a panel of coins to "draw attention to the most important challenge of our time, that of providing food, training and work for a rapidly expanding world population". These coins had two purposes, to serve as daily reminders, over the period of a generation, of the national and international efforts needed to meet the challenge of world food development, and to provide, through seigniorage as funds to help finance such development. People buying these FAO coin panels were thus making a personal contribution toward tackling the challenge set by the programme.

The 1970s FAO coin panel was the first international coin issue in monetary history. There were 23 contributing designers from around the world, amongst them Stuart Devlin, William Gardner and Christopher Ironside.

Description

The complete set of the Food and Agriculture Organization of the United Nations 1970 coin set was 45 coins, representing 33 countries. 10,000 numbered box sets were produced. The coins of the British Commonwealth had their reverse designed by Christopher Ironside. (Note: There are designs prepared by Ironside held in the National Archives in Kew that illustrate other themes relating to the idea of "food for all the world": a 5c deer, 5c ram, 5c fish and 5c chickens. However, it does not appear that these designs were ever used.)

These coins were struck as (Board 1):

- Jamaica: 1 cent in bronze, 2g, 21mm dia. 1975–2000; shaped 12-sided; (Mintage 15M). Struck by the Royal Mint London; Design: Ackee the national fruit of Jamaica; Inscription: The national fruit.
- Rwanda: 2 Francs in aluminium, 1,5g, 23mm dia. 1970; scalloped with 16 notches (Mintage 5M). Struck by the Royal Mint, London. Design: Boy filling coffee basket symbol of the Rwanda Savings Bank; Inscription: Augmentons La Production (Let us increase production).

=== Isle of Man (1970) ===
Under the provision of the Manx Decimal Currency Act of 1970, a decimal series of coins for the Isle of Man were prepared and released on 20 October 1971 (½, 1, 2, 5, 10 and 50 new pence coins). The reverse of most of these coins was designed by Christopher Ironside. This set had the same composition and size as the corresponding British coins. (Note: The British Museum, The Christopher Ironside Collection: object: pencil drawn sketch of a design for the reverse of a 50 New pence coin from Isle of Man (Item 79 & 80), dated from the 1960s: the inscription is around the edge with a central image of an eagle (seen side on) stood above a child in a basket. However this design was not used.)

These coins were struck as:

1971 first decimal set (issued from 1971 to 1974):

- ½ New penny, bronze; 2g, 17mm dia. (300,000 minted); reverse Cushag yellow field flower regarded as the national flower.
- 1 New penny, bronze; 4g, 20mm dia. (1M mintage); reverse design of a ring chain cross based on 10th- and 11th-century Norse decorations.
- 5 New pence, cupro-nickel; 5g, 24mm dia. (100,000 minted); reverse design showing the Tower of Refuge, which was erected in 1832 on the rock near the entrance to Douglas Harbour, notorious as a place of shipwreck.
- 10 New pence, cupro-nickel; 11g, 28mm dia. (1,6M); reverse design the Three Legs of Man (triskelion), the official arms of the Isle of Man. This is a traditional design that has appeared on a long line of IOM coins.
- 50 New pence, silver; 13g, 30mm dia. (Mintage 100,000); heptagonal; reverse design a Viking ship.
- 1 Crown; cupro-nickel; 38mm dia. Manx cat by C. Ironside. Commemorative Silver 1970. This is a very traditional design motif dating back to the 1700s.
- On all of the above: obverse of Queen Elizabeth II by Arnold Machin; reverse by Christopher Ironside.
- 2 New penny bronze; reverse design of two falcons by Kruger-Gray.

=== Gibraltar (1971) ===
As a territory under the sovereignty of the United Kingdom, Gibraltar decimalised its currency in the 1970s. In 1971 a 25 New Pence (1 Crown) coin was issued with a reverse design by Ironside of a Barbary macaque. (Note: The British Museum, The Christopher Ironside Collection: object: pencil drawn sketch of a design for the reverse of a 25 pence coin from Gibraltar (Item 112 & 176), namely, a first inscription around the edge of the coin with the coat of arms of Gibraltar in the centre – with a second inscription forming part of this.)

Description

- 25 New Pence (= 1 Crown), copper-nickel, 38mm dia.; round, 1971 (75,000 minted by the Royal Mint; silver proofs, 20,000 minted). Obverse design: Queen Elizabeth II by Arnold Machin; reverse design: Barbary ape by Christopher Ironside.

=== Mauritius (1971–88) ===
In 1971 a new set of coins and banknotes for Mauritius were introduced by the Royal Mint. This set has Queen Elizabeth II on the obverse and a range of heraldic motives on the reverse. Some of the reverse designs for this set were designed by Christopher Ironside. (Note: The British Museum, The Christopher Ironside Collection: Object: Pencil drawn sketch of a design for the reverse of a 10 rupee coin from Mauritius.; Object: Pencil drawn sketch of a design for the reverse of a 25 rupee coin from Mauritius (Item 108 & 166); The inscription is around the edge of the coin with a central image of a bird with a lizard like creature in its claws. The annotation is below the design on the left.; Object: Three identical mounted drawings of different sizes for a Mauritius 200 Rupee coin. (obverse) The inscription is around the edge of the coin with a central image of a man and woman lounging around outside surrounded by trees and foliage. The annotation is directly below the design. This is repeated for each of the three coins (Item 139).)

These coins were struck as:

1971 Mauritius Independence Proof Set: Set of 9 coins in fitted case, 750 issued, comprising:

- 200 rupees, gold, 27mm dia.; (2,500 minted); Obverse: Elizabeth II; reverse design courting couple by Christopher Ironside.
- 10 rupees, silver, 35mm dia.; Reverse design of a dodo by Christopher Ironside.

1974 to 1975 World Wildlife Fund Silver Proof Coin Collection. In the early 1970s the WWF organised for each of twenty-four different countries to issue two proof silver crowns, each depicting some form of endangered species from their particular region of the planet. Mauritius issues the following two coins:

- 50 rupees, silver, 42mm dia. Reverse Mauritius kestrel by C. Ironside (see below, originally this design was to be used on a 25 rupees coin).

1988, Mauritian Proof: 250 Rupees, gold. Obverse: The Rt. Hon. Jugnauth (designer unknown); reverse: Dodo design by C. Ironside.

=== Malta (1972) ===
As a country under the sovereignty of the United Kingdom, Malta decimalised its currency in the 1970s. In May 1972 a new set of Maltese coins was issued. The Malta pound, which was renamed Maltese lira (Lm) in 1983, was retained as the currency unit.

The design rationale for the new coins was both to proclaim the country's independence and to feature the distinguished personalities, historical monuments and edifices, flora, fauna and folklore articles of Malta. These coins were designed by Christopher Ironside. (Note: The British Museum, The Christopher Ironside Collection: object: pencil drawn sketches of designs for the obverse and the reverse of coins from Malta.)

Description Eight coins were issued in the following denominations: 2 mils, 3 mils, 5 mils, 1 cent, 2 cents, 5 cents, 10 cents, 50 cents. The mils were in aluminium, the 1 cent in bronze, and the rest in cupro-nickel.

These coins were struck as:

- 2 mils in aluminium, 1g, 20,3mm dia., scalloped, 1972–1986 (100,000). Obverse design: Maltese cross (reference to the Knights of St John and the occupation of Malta). The Maltese cross is the national symbol of Malta and is displayed as part of the Maltese civil ensign. The obverse perimeter design of four fishes and the reverse design of plant leaves around edges with denomination in the centre standard to all coins.
- 3 mils in aluminium, 1,5g, 23mm dia., scalloped, 1972–1986 (71,000). Obverse design: Maltese bee wings outspread over a honeycomb. Historically the bee has long been the symbol of industry and hard work, while the honeycomb represents the manifestation of divine harmony in nature.
- 5 mils in aluminium, 2,1g, 26mm dia., scalloped, 1972–1986 (4,5M). Obverse design: figure of a water carrier.
- 1 cent in bronze, 7g, 26mm dia., round, 1972–1986 (10M). Obverse design: George cross.
- 2 cent in copper-nickel, 17mm dia. 1972–1986 (13M). Obverse design: Knights Hospitaler wearing an elm.
- 5 cent in copper-nickel, 5,6g, 23mm dia., round, 1972–1981 (5M). Obverse design: temple altar found in the Mnajdra, a megalithic temple complex in Malta (UNESCO World Heritage Site).
- 10 cent in copper-nickel, 11g, 28,5mm dia., round, 1972–1981 (10M). Obverse design: Grand Master's barge.
- 50 cent in copper-nickel, 13g, 32,9mm dia. 1972–1981 (10M). Obverse design: man with sword and shield flanked by two women.

=== Kuwait (1976) ===
Ironside designed the obverse of a Kuwaiti coin commemorating the 15th anniversary of the National Day of the State of Kuwait, which remained uncirculated. It was struck as:

- 2 Dinars in 50% silver and 50% nickel (although some descriptions state 99% silver), 28g, 38mm dia. 1976 ( 70,00 minted; uncirculated). Obverse carrying the profiles of Sheikh Abdullah III Al-Salim Al-Sabah, who was the last Sheikh and first Emir of Kuwait and who witnessed the independence of Kuwait, and his half-brother Sabah III Al-Salim Al-Sabah who succeeded him and was Emir at the time the coin was struck; reverse depicting the gate of the old wall of Kuwait City; a dhows, a traditional sailing boat used throughout the region; and, an oil derrick, the main source of wealth for the country.
- Christopher Ironside designed the obverse, while the reverse is not documented. (Note: The British Museum, The Christopher Ironside Collection: object: pencil drawn sketch of a design for the obverse of a Kuwait commemorative coin; inscription around the edge with a central image of two male heads facing right.)

=== Singapore (1985) ===
Singapore's second series of coins, designed by Ironside in about 1981, and put into circulation in 1985, were known as the Floral Series. The design brief was to highlight the botanical diversity of Singapore as part of a government effort to foster national pride and identity. The Vanda 'Miss Joaquim' orchid was chosen as the country's national flower in 1981.

Description

- 1, 5, 10, 20 and 50 cent, 1 dollar denominations (design cir. 1980; circulation 1985 – current).
- The obverse design bears the Singapore Arms in the centre surrounded by the word "SINGAPORE" in the four official languages around the circumference of the coins. The year-date is below the Singapore Arms.

These coins were struck as:

- 1 cent in bronze, 2g, 18mm dia. 1985–1990; copper-plated zinc 1992– current (636M). Stopped minting in 2002. Shows Singapore's national flower, Vanda Miss Joaquim.
- 5 cent in aluminium-bronze, 1,6g, 16mm dia. 1985– current (520M). Shows the fruit salad plant (Monstera deliciosa).
- 10 cent in copper-nickel, 2,8g, 19mm dia. 1985– current (1,300M). Shows the star jasmine (Jasminum multiflorum).
- 20 cents in copper-nickel, 6g, 24mm dia. 1985– current (900M). Shows the powder-puff plant (Calliandra surinamensis).
- 50 cent in copper-nickel, 7g, 24mm dia. 2 Dec 1985– current (450M). Stopped minting 2007. Shows the yellow Allamanda (Allamanda cathartica).
- 1 dollar in aluminium-bronze, 6g, 22mm dia. 28 Sep 1987– current (660M). Stopped minting 2006. Shows periwinkle (Lochnera rosea).

There is a possibility that the original design work is stored in the National Archives, Kew.

== Medals, awards and general works ==
1. Camouflage Directorate (1940–1945)
2. Der Rosenkavalier Ballet – scenery and costumes (1947 onwards)
3. Festival of Britain, exhibitions: Shakespeare, Dome of Discovery and Crystal Palace (1951)
4. Exhibition stands (circa 1950)
5. Sylvia Ballet – scenery and costumes (1952)
6. Royal Yacht Britannia – Queen's Study mirror and Sitting Room fire-guard (1952)
7. Time and Life Building (London) clock (1952)
8. Coronation Procession – Whitehall heraldic shield (1953)
9. Alceste Ballet, Glyndebourne – Apollo statue (1953)
10. Mount Everest model figures of Edmund Hillary and Tenzing Norgay (1953 and 1954)
11. A Midsummer Night's Dream Ballet – scenery and costumes; London, New York and Canada (1954)
12. Daily Mail Idea Home Exhibition – Dawn of Civilisation grotto and flying chariots (1954)
13. Royal Academy Summer Exhibition – paintings (c.1954)
14. SS Iberia – ship's clock (1954)
15. The Bedford Corner Hotel, martins Bank Ltd – entrance crest (1955)
16. Les Troyens Ballet – scenery (1955)
17. RSA Benjamin Franklin Medal (1956)
18. British Academy, Kenyon Award (1957)
19. Bank of London and South America (London) – clock (1957)
20. Sir James Swinburne Award (1958)
21. Leathersellers' Livery Hall – clock (1960)
22. British Exhibition Medal, New York(1960)
23. Trustee Saving Bank (TSB) – saving tokens (1960)
24. La Sylphide Ballet – scenery and costumes (1960)
25. Ministry of Housing and Local Government' Award for Good Design (1960)
26. Royal Musical Association, The Edward J Dent Award (1961)
27. Bertrand Russell Peace Foundation Medal (1962)
28. Royal Anthropological Institute, Patron's Medal (1962)
29. The National Trust Donor token (1963)
30. Shakespeare Festival stamps (1964)
31. British Sub-Aqua Club Award (1965)
32. Battle of Hastings 900th Anniversary Medal (1966)
33. Britannia Commemorative Society Medals (1968)
34. The Sailing of the Pilgrim Fathers Medals (1970)
35. The Worshipful Company of Painter-Stainers/ RCA, Hugh Dunn Award (c. 1970)
36. Man in Space medal box set; Danbury Mint (c. 1970)
37. Northern Ireland Parliament Medal (1971)
38. The Life of Jesus medal box set; Danbury Mint (c. 1972)
39. Warders of the Tower of London Medal (1972)
40. London Stock Exchange Medal and tapestries (1972)
41. Peter Cazalet Memorial, Shipbourne, Kent (c. 1973)
42. American Revolution medal box set; Columbia Mint (1974)
43. Churchill Medal (1974)
44. The 16th Duke of Norfolk Memorial, Fitzalan Chapel, Arundel Castle (1975)
45. Tallow Chandlers Award (1977)
46. Tower of London Queen's Silver Jubilee Medal (1977)
47. 250th anniversary of the death of Sir Isaac Newton commemorative medal (1977)
48. Tower of London 900th Anniversary Medal (1978)
49. The Lumb Golden Bale Award (c. 1979)
50. The Earl Mountbatten of Burma Memorial, Westminster Abbey (1979)
51. The Earl of Perth Memorial
52. Mauritius Royal Wedding Commemorative 1,000 Rupees gold coin (1981)
53. Uranium Institute Award (1985)
54. Claridges interiors – restaurant and Ladies Lift (1985–1987)

== Sources ==
- Bruce, Colin R. (2008). Standard catalog of world coins: 1901–2000. ISBN 9780896895010.
