= Top Gear (retailer) =

Top Gear was a boutique established in the 1960s by James Wedge and Pat Booth on the Kings Road, London. It was an influential shop which Barbara Hulanicki was "most envious of", and acquired a reputation for selling Mod clothing to the "rich and influential". Customers included Marianne Faithfull, Mick Jagger and The Beatles.

The carrier bags had a distinctive bullseye design — which became a popular Mod icon used by The Who.
