= Fashion and Textile Museum =

Museum in the United Kingdom

- Museum logo

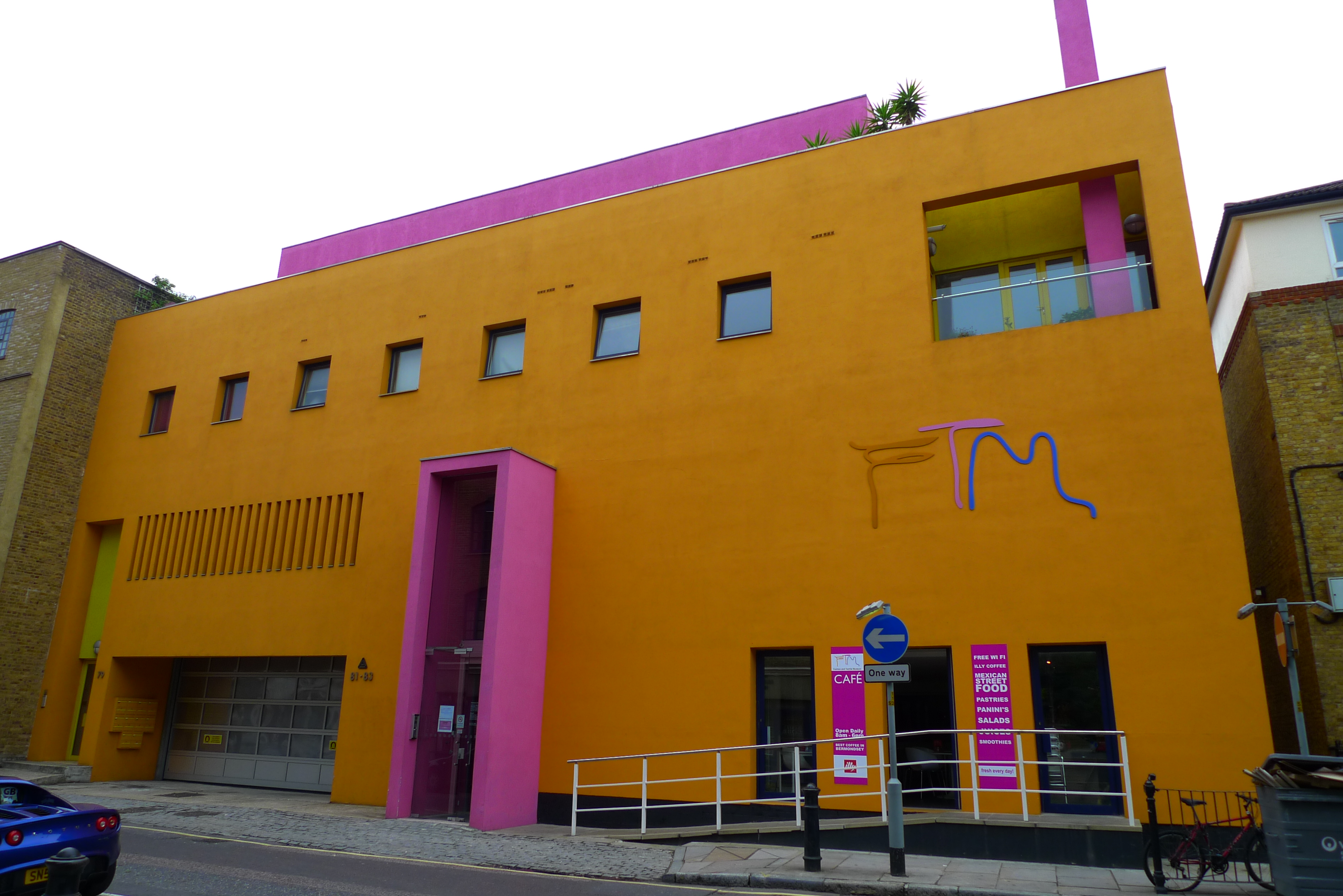
- Fashion and Textile Museum

- Location in London
- Established: 2003
- Location: Bermondsey, London Borough of Southwark
- Coordinates: 51°29′55″N 000°04′52″W
- Type: Fashion, textiles
- Founder: Zandra Rhodes
- Architect: Ricardo Legorreta
- Public transit access: London Bridge station
- Website: fashiontextilemuseum.org

The Fashion and Textile Museum is an English museum.

The Fashion and Textile Museum was founded in 2003 by Zandra Rhodes and is operated by the Newham College of Further Education. Located in Bermondsey, it is in a building designed by Mexican architect Ricardo Legorreta.

== Building ==
The museum is in a converted warehouse that was redesigned by Mexican architect Ricardo Legorreta in collaboration with Zandra Rhodes. It was Legorreta's first and only building in Europe. In addition to the exhibition space, the building has a textile studio, printing workshop, and private residential quarters. The building has become a tourist attraction due to its colour scheme of hot pink, burnt orange, yellow, and bright blue.

== Exhibitions ==
=== Current exhibition ===
Paint! Pattern! Print! The Textiles of Susan Collier and Sarah Campbell, at the museum, 27 March 2026 – 13 September 2026

=== Past exhibitions ===
- Costume Couture: Sixty Years of Cosprop is at the museum 26 September 2025 to 8 March 2026.
- Textiles: The Art of Mankind - 28 March - 7 September 2025
- Outlaws: Fashion Renegades of 80s London - 4 October 2024 - 9 March 2025
- The Biba Story, 1964-1975 - 22 March - 8 September 2024
- The Fabric of Democracy: Propaganda Textiles from the French Revolution to Brexit - 29 September 2023 - 3 March 2024
- Andy Warhol: The Textiles - 31 March - 10 September 2023
- Kaffe Fassett: The Power of Pattern - 23 September 2022 - 12 March 2023
- 150 Years of the Royal School of Needlework: Crown to Catwalk - 1 April – 4 September 2022
- Beautiful People: The Boutique in 1960s Counterculture - 3 September 2021 – January 2022
- Annie Phillips: Ancient Technique and Contemporary Art - 18 May – 12 September 2021
- Chintz: Cotton in Bloom - 18 May – 12 September 2021
- Out of the Blue: Fifty Years of Designers Guild - 14 February 2020 – 21 February 2021
- Zandra Rhodes: 50 Years of Fabulous - 27 September 2019 – 26 January 2020
- Norman Hartnell – A Tribute - 27 September 2019 – 26 January 2020
- Weavers of the Clouds: Textile Arts of Peru - 21 June – 8 September 2019
- Will You Be My Valentine? Works by Natalie Gibson - 8 February – 2 June 2019
- Swinging London: A Lifestyle Revolution | Terence Conran – Mary Quant - 8 February – 2 June 2019
- Elizabeth Suter: Sharp Lines and Swift Sketches - 8 February – 2 June 2019
- Night and Day: 1930s Fashion and Photographs - 12 October 2018 – 20 January 2019
- Cecil Beaton: Thirty from the 30s – Fashion, Film and Fantasy - 12 October 2018 – 20 January 2019
- Orla Kiely: A Life in Pattern - 25 May – 23 September 2018
- T-Shirt: Cult – Culture – Subversion – 9 February 2018 – 6 May 2018
- T: The Typology of The T-Shirt - 9 February – 6 May 2018
- The Secret Life of Scissors - 9 February – 6 May 2018
- Harper's Bazaar 150 Years – The Greatest Moments – 20 October 2017 – 21 January 2018
- Wallace Sewell: 25 Years of British Textile Design – 20 October 2017 – 21 January 2018
- Louise Dahl-Wolfe: A Style of Her Own – 20 October 2017 – 21 January 2018
- The World of Anna Sui – 26 May – 1 October 2017
- Festival of Textiles 2017 - 28 January – 7 May 2017
- Josef Frank Patterns–Furniture–Painting – 28 January – 7 May 2017
- Full Circle & Recycle: 21st Century Swedish Textiles - 28 January – 7 May 2017
- Gudrun Sjödén: Four Decades of Colour & Design - 25 April – 7 May 2017
- 1920s Jazz Age Fashion & Photographs – 23 September 2016 – 15 January 2017
- James Abbe: Photographer of the Jazz Age - 23 September 2016 – 15 January 2017
- London Design Festival: New Artist Textiles from Canada - 16–18 September 2016
- London Fashion Foundation Show - 16–18 September 2016
- Missoni Art Colour – 6 May – 4 September 2016
- Festival of Textiles 2016 - 11 March – 17 April 2016
- Art Textiles: Marian Clayden - 11 March – 17 April 2016
- Liberty in Fashion – 9 October 2015 – 28 February 2016
- The Art of Pattern - 9 October 2015 – 28 February 2016
- Rayne: Shoes for Stars - 22 May – 13 September 2015
- Riviera Style: Resort and Swimwear Style Since 1900 – 22 May 2015 – 30 August 2015 (in partnership with King and McGaw)
- A Journey to the Riviera - 22 May – 13 September 2015
- Nautical Chic by Amber Jane Butchart - 22 May – 27 August 2015
- Thea Porter: 70s Bohemian Chic - 6 February – 3 May 2015
- Mirror Man: Andrew Logan Portraits - 6 February – 3 May 2015
- Knitwear: From Chanel to Westwood – 19 September 2014 – 18 January 2015
- How to Draw Vintage Fashion - 19 September 2014 – 18 January 2015
- PATTERN: Watts’ Architect Wallpapers 1870 to today - 19 September 2014 – 18 January 2015
- Knitwear in Fashion Photography - 19 September 2014 – 18 January 2015
- Visionary Knitwear - 19 September 2014 – 18 January 2015
- El Intercambio Cultural/A Cultural Exchange - 6 June – 31 August 2014
- Made in Mexico: The Rebozo in Art, Culture & Fashion - 6 June – 31 August 2014
- Artist Textiles: Picasso to Warhol - 31 January – 18 May 2014
- Sarah Campbell ‘from start to finish’ - 31 January – 17 May 2014
- The Glamour of Bellville Sassoon - 20 September 2013 – 11 January 2014
- Zandra Rhodes: Unseen - 12 July – 31 August 2013
- Designing Women: Post-war British Textiles 16 March 2012 – 16 June 2012
- The Printed Square – Vintage Handkerchiefs – 22 March 2012 – 16 June 2012
- Kaffe Fassett: A Life in Colour - 22 March – 29 June 2013
- Hartnell to Amies: Couture By Royal Appointment - 16 November 2012 – 23 February 2013
- POP! Culture and Fashion 1955–1976 – 6 July 2012 – 27 October 2012
- Designing Women: Post-War British Textiles - 16 March – 16 June 2012
- Catwalk to Cover – A Front Row Seat - 18 November 2011 – 25 February 2012
- Tommy Nutter: Rebel on the Row – 20 May 2011 – 22 October 2011
- Sue Timney and the design of Timney-Fowler – 16 November 2010 – 25 April 2011
- Horrockses Fashions: Off the Peg Style in the '40s and '50s – 9 July 2010 – 24 October 2010
- 30 years of Pineapple by Debbie Moore – 18 January 2010 – 24 February 2010
- Very Sanderson – 150 Years of English Decoration - 19 March – 13 June 2010
- Foale and Tuffin – Made in England – 23 October 2009 – 24 February 2010
- Undercover: The Evolution of Underwear – 12 June 2009 – 27 September 2009
- Swedish Fashion: Exploring A New Identity – 6 February 2009 – 17 May 2009
- Billy: Bill Gibb's Moment in Time – 24 October 2008 – 18 January 2009
- Little Black Dress – 20 June 2008 – 25 August 2008
- Peacocks and Pinstripes – 8 February 2008 – 31 May 2008

== See also ==
- Fashion museum
- Textile museum
