= Sue Clowes =

English textile and fashion designer

Sue Clowes (born 31 October 1957) is an English textile and fashion designer known for the collection that launched Boy George and Culture Club in 1981.

== Career ==
=== Textiles and fashion ===
Throughout Clowes's career, music and musicians have influenced her work: Culture Club approached her to design a collection for the group to sell in the shop The Foundry in Ganton Street where George O'Dowd (later widely known as Boy George) worked as a window dresser. Clowes created a cultural cocktail of offbeat imagery with religious undertones.

The Flesh and Steel collection of winter 1983 of printed silver crosses was worn by Jonny Slut of Specimen. Susanne Bartsch, an event producer provided early exposure for British designers with a series of shows in New York and then Tokyo. Clowes took part alongside other 1980s designers, including Leigh Bowery. Kylie Minogue wore a Sue Clowes vintage t-shirt for the Anti Tour.

=== Research and development ===
Clowes moved to Italy in 1987, and became involved in wearable technology or "smart clothing". Clowes worked in an academic team called Grado Zero Espace, with Italian engineers and scientists, to pioneer clothing that incorporated technology. These garments won awards from Time and Popular Science. She also worked on the project of shape-memory alloy named Nitinol to obtain the first woven fabric. Clowes worked on the team that researched and developed a jacket padded with Aerogel. The jacket called Absolute Zero was taken on an Antarctic expedition. For Corpo Nove, Clowes researched Stinging Nettle fibres which were woven to produce jeans. She gave a conference at the Eden Project.

=== Journalism ===
Clowes wrote articles for an Italian magazine called N9VE.

== Recent work ==
Clowes re-launched the Sue Clowes brand in 2012 with her daughter Marta Melani and collaborated on an edition of five pairs of sneakers for Italian cult shoe company Fornarina Srl. The sneakers along with their winter Night Sky Junkie collection was modelled by dancers on skates during Milan Menswear Fashion Week, 2014 at the Milan Alphabet nightclub.

In July 2013 the Victoria and Albert Museum showcased looks from young designers of London Fashion in the 80s in an exhibition called Club to Catwalk. The museum requisitioned two of Clowes’outfits which are permanently held in their archives. The exhibition ran from July 2013 until February 2014.

In 2019 Clowes collaborated with London-based John Moore Reimagined and four of her designs were printed onto shirts. Reported in the Financial Times in February 2019.

April 2023 Clowes collaborated with Supreme New York American clothing and skateboarding lifestyle brand to create a collection featuring Sue Clowes's original artwork from the early 1980s. The SS23 collection consists of a Jacket, Shirt, Ringer Tee, Chino Pant and cap.

12 December 2023. Kerry Taylor, an auction house, sold ensembles from Sue Clowes's personal 1980s collections in the "Passion for Fashion" auction.

January 2024. Clowes designed and screen printed a collection of images for Italian fashion company Simon Cracker. The garments were shown at a fashion show at ARCA, Milan on 14 January 2024. Simon Cracker (stylists Simone Botte and Filippo Biraghi) called their collection ‘La Nanna’ to capture the moment before sleep. Clowes printed surreal collages on upcycled denim jackets and jeans that harmonized with the sleep theme. The show was reported in Corriere Della Sera.

October 2024. The Fashion and Textile Museum, London, opened the exhibition OUTLAWS. The exhibition centers around the nightclub Taboo, opened by performance artist Leigh Bowery in 1985. The exhibition displays garments from over thirty designers, including John Galliano John Flett, Stephen Linard and Dean Bright. Two of Sue Clowes's outfits from the Culture Club 80s era are on show. The exhibition is curated by Martin Green, Duovision Arts, and NJ Stevenson. Artistic Director David Cabaret. Creative Consultant James Lawler, Duovision Arts. Exhibition dates: 4 October 2024 – 9 March 2025. November 2024. The Winchester Gallery , part of Winchester School of Art and Southampton University, opened the exhibition Collecting Sue Clowes. Associate Professor Dr Shaun Cole curated the exhibition and it includes many pieces from Clowes worn by 80s pop icons such as Boy George Culture Club Jonny Slut Jennie BelleStar Spandau Ballet Kim Wilde Eurythmics Southampton-based collector, Mikey Bean loaned his archive of Sue Clowes clothing and related ephemera for this show Exhibition dates: 15 November – 18 January.
