= Marit Allen =

English fashion journalist and costume designer

- Born: 17 September 1941; Cheshire, England
- Died: 26 November 2007 (aged 66); Sydney, Australia
- Education: University of Grenoble
- Occupations: fashion journalist costume designer
- Spouse: Sanford Lieberson (m. 1966; div. 1983)
- Children: 3

Marit Allen (17 September 1941 – 26 November 2007) was an English fashion journalist and costume designer. She has received various accolades, including a BAFTA Award and a César Award, in addition to nominations for an Academy Award and two Emmy Awards. Her film credits include Dirty Rotten Scoundrels (1988), The Witches (1990), Mrs. Doubtfire (1993), Eyes Wide Shut (1999), Brokeback Mountain (2005), and La Vie en Rose (2007).

== Early life ==
Allen was born on September 17, 1941, in Cheshire, England, to a Norwegian mother and an English father. She was a pupil at Adcote School, an independent girls' boarding school in Shropshire between 1951 and 1959. She then graduated from the University of Grenoble in France.

== Fashion career ==
Allen's career in fashion began in 1961 when she took a job as a trainee at Queen Magazine. She quickly became editor and writer for the 'About 20' young fashion section of the magazine, which she used to showcase young design talent and innovative photography. In 1964, when the editor of Queen, Beatrix Miller, went to edit British Vogue, she took Allen with her. For Vogue, Allen founded the 'Young Idea' pages which continued to champion up-and-coming innovative young designers such as John Bates and Foale and Tuffin. Allen's layouts were also original, including a spread based on the Batman comic strip in June 1966. She occasionally modeled for her own articles, and wore the designs she featured. For her 1966 wedding to the film producer Sandy Lieberson, Allen wore an ultra-modern mini-dress and coat trimmed with silver vinyl designed by John Bates. Allen remained at Vogue until 1973. She also helped to establish the bachelor's degree program in journalism at Central St. Martin's Art College in 1973.

== Film career ==
Allen was persuaded to enter the costume-designing business for film by director Nicolas Roeg after her successful career in fashion journalism. Following her entry into costume design, Allen worked on the costumes for a number of Roeg's movies, including Don't Look Now, The Witches and Eureka.

Allen also developed a working relationship with Taiwanese film director, Ang Lee. The two collaborated to create the costumes for a number of Ang's major films, including Hulk, Brokeback Mountain and Ride with the Devil.

Allen's other noted films included La Vie En Rose (2007), for which she received her sole Oscar nomination, Love in the Time of Cholera (2007), Dirty Rotten Scoundrels (1988), Dead Man (1995), and Little Shop of Horrors (1986).

In addition to her Oscar nomination, Allen was honoured for her work with two Emmy nominations, as well as a Costume Designers Guild award and a BAFTA for her work on La Vie En Rose.

== Death ==
Allen died of a brain aneurysm in Sydney, Australia, on 26 November 2007, at the age of 66. She had three children: Lucy, Ben, and Holly.

At the time of her death, she worked with Australian filmmaker George Miller on pre-production of his never-made film Justice League: Mortal.
