= Margaret Green =

British painter

- Born: 7 March 1925; West Hartlepool
- Died: 4 December 2003 (aged 78); Saxtead, Suffolk
- Education: West Hartlepool School of Art; Royal College of Art
- Spouse: Lionel Bulmer

Margaret Green (7 March 1925 – 4 December 2003) was a British figurative painter.

== Biography ==
Green was born in West Hartlepool; her father worked at a steel plant, and was also a member of the local art club. From 1944 she studied at West Hartlepool School of Art and then won a scholarship to the Royal College of Art where she studied until 1947. She won several prizes at the RCA, including a Silver Medal and Painting Prize. In 1947 Green started teaching at Walthamstow College of Art, then in the 1960s at the Royal Academy Schools.

Green's husband was the artist Lionel Bulmer. They lived in Sussex from the 1950s, and restored their mediaeval house and its garden at Onehouse. Green also kept a studio in Chelsea, London. In 1972 Green had a solo exhibition at the New Grafton Gallery and in 2002 Messum's held a joint exhibition of her and her husband's work.

Green was a member of the New English Art Club, and also exhibited with the London Group and at the Royal Academy. Her work is included in the UK Government Art Collection, the Hartlepool Art Gallery and the Herbert Art Gallery and Museum.
