= Sally Tuffin =

English fashion designer and ceramicist

Sally Tuffin (born 1938 in Essex) is an English fashion designer and ceramicist who, with Marion Foale, was half of Foale and Tuffin, the groundbreaking fashion label that was part of the "youthquake" movement in 1960s London.

== Early life and education ==
Tuffin is the daughter of a dressmaker mother and a printer and draughtsman father. She was educated at Friends' School, a progressive Quaker school in Saffron Walden.

Tuffin studied at Walthamstow College of Art, where she became friends with Marion Foale, who was in the year below her. On graduating, they enrolled in 1959 on a fashion design diploma course at the Royal College of Art headed by Janey Ironside.

== Fashion designs ==
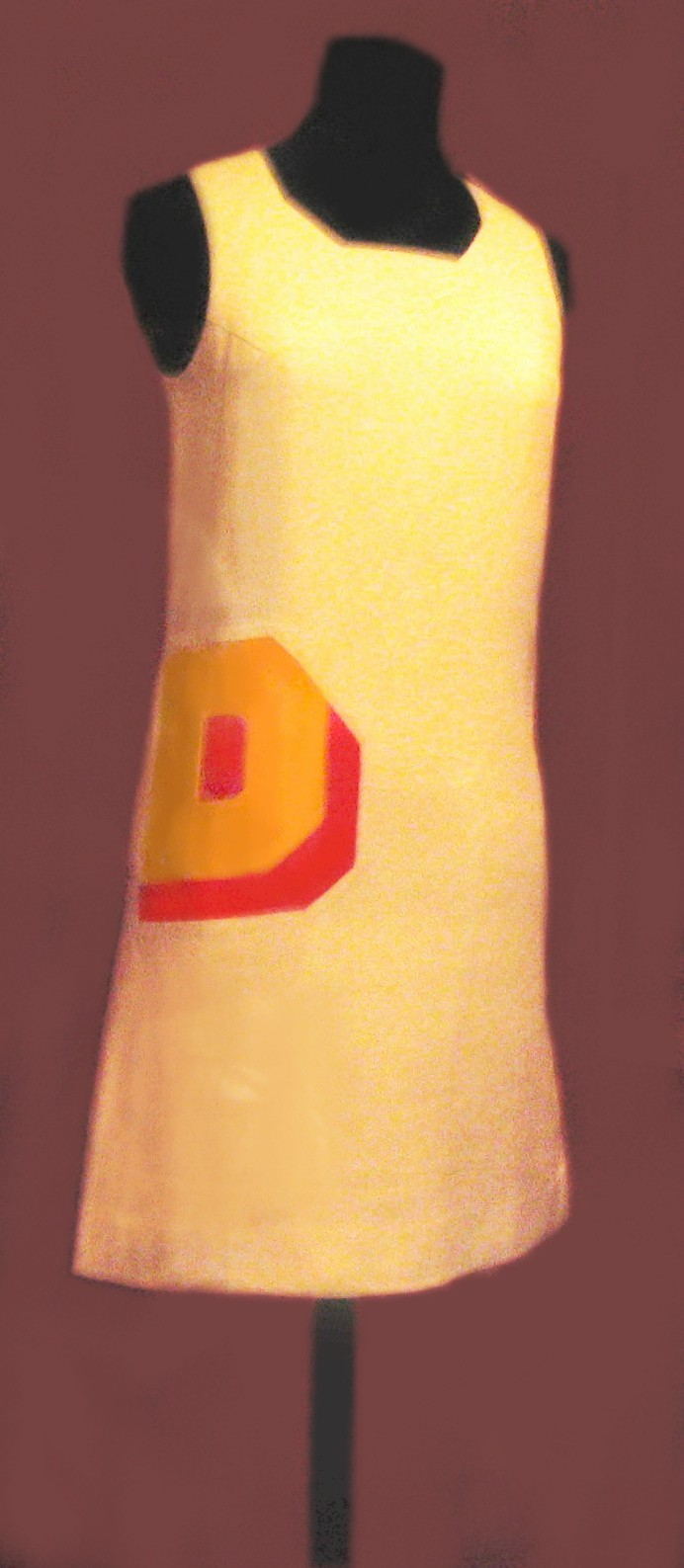
Foale & Tuffin dress, 1966

Having both been given sewing machines by their parents for their 21st birthdays and having spent £5 on a steam iron, they founded the Foale and Tuffin label, for which they created a range of colourful and fun dresses, skirts and tops. These were sold through their own shop in Carnaby Street, and later through department stores. Foale and Tuffin were among the first designers to experiment with creating trousers for women that were "flattering, sexy garments".

Their friend James Wedge helped them become established as designers and retailers. According to Tuffin, to make their clothes, they "worked on the billiards table in Jimmy Wedge's flat". According to Foale, Wedge had his offices in Ganton Street and told them about a place round the corner in Marlborough Court with a low rent. Soon, they needed more space, so Wedge found space for them above him, and when he moved out, they took over 4 Ganton Street in its entirety.

== Ceramicist ==
Tuffin is now a ceramicist.

In 1986 Moorcroft, a UK art pottery, was rescued by Maureen and Hugh Edwards together with Tuffin and her husband Richard Dennis, a former art dealer. Tuffin became Art Director of the firm and designed ceramics for them from 1987 to 1997. Her numerous designs include: Carp, Bramble, Peacock and Rain Forest. Sally Tuffin and Richard Denis left the firm in 1992, since when Maureen and Hugh Edwards have been the sole owners.

Sally Tuffin and Richard Dennis now run the independent pottery Dennis Chinaworks.

== See also ==
- Mary Quant
