= Gerald McCann (fashion designer) =

British fashion designer (1931–2019)

- Born: 11 November 1931; England, UK
- Died: 26 June 2019 (aged 87); Lancashire, England, UK
- Occupation: Fashion designer

Gerald McCann (5 November 1931 – 26 June 2019) was a British fashion designer who was considered among the leading lights of the Swinging London fashion scene, alongside names such as Mary Quant, subsequently moving to the United States to continue his career with Larry Levine.

After early commercial success designing for other brands, McCann established his own label in 1963. He attracted the attention of influential US fashion buyers in the mid-1960s and soon began designing for the American market, as well as for key British fashion retailers targeting the youth market. He moved to the US to work on New York's Seventh Avenue in 1974, returning to Britain some two decades later, where he continued supplying UK fashion retailers.

In a profile piece in The Times in 1991, Liz Smith described him as: "a master of high style at low prices". The Victoria and Albert Museum (V&A) described him as playing: "an influential role in the development of the UK fashion industry". He died in June 2019 at the age of 87.

== Background and early career ==
McCann trained at the Royal College of Art under Madge Garland during the early 1950s, also getting involved in designing dresses for debutantes in the run up to the coronation of the Queen.

After graduating in 1953, McCann's first job was designing with Marks & Spencer – he began creating designs for them while he was still a student. In a 2006 interview with the V&A, he recalled that this was a very smart job, involving trips to the Paris fashion shows to view haute-couture work by Balmain and Dior. Although notable successes included a dress design for Marks & Spencer that sold a million copies – for which he received a cheque from Lord Marks – McCann decided this wasn't his long-term future and left to join the upmarket ready-to-wear house of Harry B. Popper. There, he was involved with designing and selling to private clients, including Princess Marina, and to high-end stores such as Harrods. Harry B. Popper also supplied clothes to the Queen and Princess Alexandra

Mary Quant's husband Alexander Plunket Greene asked McCann to help stock their first Bazaar boutique on the King's Road in 1955, and he took charge of the clothes while Quant handled the accessories.

== Establishment of own fashion house ==
In 1963, Gerald McCann started his own business operation with a £600 bank loan. Although by this stage he had designed for a decade – everything from high-end to high-street – he was among the "brash new breed of British designers" photographed by Norman Parkinson for a Life magazine feature on how to get the Chelsea look. Others featured in the article included Mary Quant, Jean Muir, David Sassoon, Kiki Byrne, Marion Foale and Sally Tuffin. He opened a boutique on Upper Grosvenor Street, Mayfair (downstairs from Raphael and Leonard's House of Beauty), and his black crepe and organza dress was featured in The Observer just before Christmas, with author Janey Ironside noting that the design had: "the added advantage that you do not look as if you had gone to the party in your slip and it is just as suitable for dancing the Birdie or the Hitchhike as for standing jammed clutching a glass".

He became a key supplier to the hip boutique Woollands' 21, as well as Harrods and Peter Robinson's Top Shop The buyer at Woollands' 21 Vanessa Denza noted that his dresses were always top sellers. McCann was the only one of the young designers stocked by Woollands' 21 to have his own manufacturing base – he had a number of factories in Brewer Street and Poland Street, Soho – so could supply the larger orders (for instance, 350 of one item) with lead times of a week.

McCann's designs frequently appeared in Vogue's 'Young Ideas' section, then supervised by Lady Rendlesham. His bra-cut dresses in denim and gingham, gymslips with low pockets and men's shirt buttons, and trapeze dresses with Peter pan collars were popular among stars such as Julie Christie, Jean Shrimpton and Susannah York. He was also a preferred designer of The Colony Room proprietor Muriel Belcher. In 1965, he dressed Rita Tushingham in the British Palme d'Or-winning comedy The Knack. He was also among the 'young design quartet' – alongside Jean Muir, Roger Nelson and Moya Bowler – to produce shoes for Rayne. By 1966, the year in which Time published its 'Swinging London' issue, McCann was a well-established name.

McCann also made his name as a pattern designer for the growing home-sewing market, creating designs for Butterick and appearing on the BBC sewing show Clothes That Count. By 1970, he was also designing for the men's market.

=== Designs for the United States ===
McCann had early appeal for the American market – indeed, in time this would eclipse his reputation in the UK. A 1964 feature in The Observer entitled 'The Importance of Being British', singled him out, alongside Burberry and Aquascutum, as a name with cachet for foreign buyers, quoting the fashion director of Helen Whiting in New York who had said: "Everything Gerald had looked new for our market". His work was also spotted by Bloomingdales buyer Ida Sciolino, who asked him to make something for her. This subsequently appeared on the cover of Glamour in the US and created a stir. McCann took his clothes designs on "whistlestop tours" of America and attracted enough attention to be invited to appear on breakfast TV shows. Bloomingdales opened a Gerald McCann department, with the buyer reporting eight buyers for every coat on the rack.

McCann commuted between London and New York between 1965 and 1973 before settling full-time as a designer in New York's Garment District. His designs had mass-market sales – one coat design for Larry Levine earned him a five-figure royalty. Alongside Bloomingdales, his clothes were stocked by Saks Fifth Avenue and Bergdorf Goodman. McCann recalled in a V&A interview that the numbers produced were on a different scale entirely: "there's no room for error because the amounts at stake are enormous, 140,000 of one style".

== Return to the UK ==
McCann returned to the UK at the start of the 1990s and began designing clothes for department stores such as Fenwick, Harrods and House of Fraser. Speaking to The Times about his return to British fashion after two decades away, he described his exasperation with the industry's focus on young designers. "What they need is a good designer to do young clothes...the trouble is that the industry forces them too early. They are never given the chance to make their mistakes in the backroom."
