= Marian Clayden =

Fashion designer and textile artist (1937–2015)

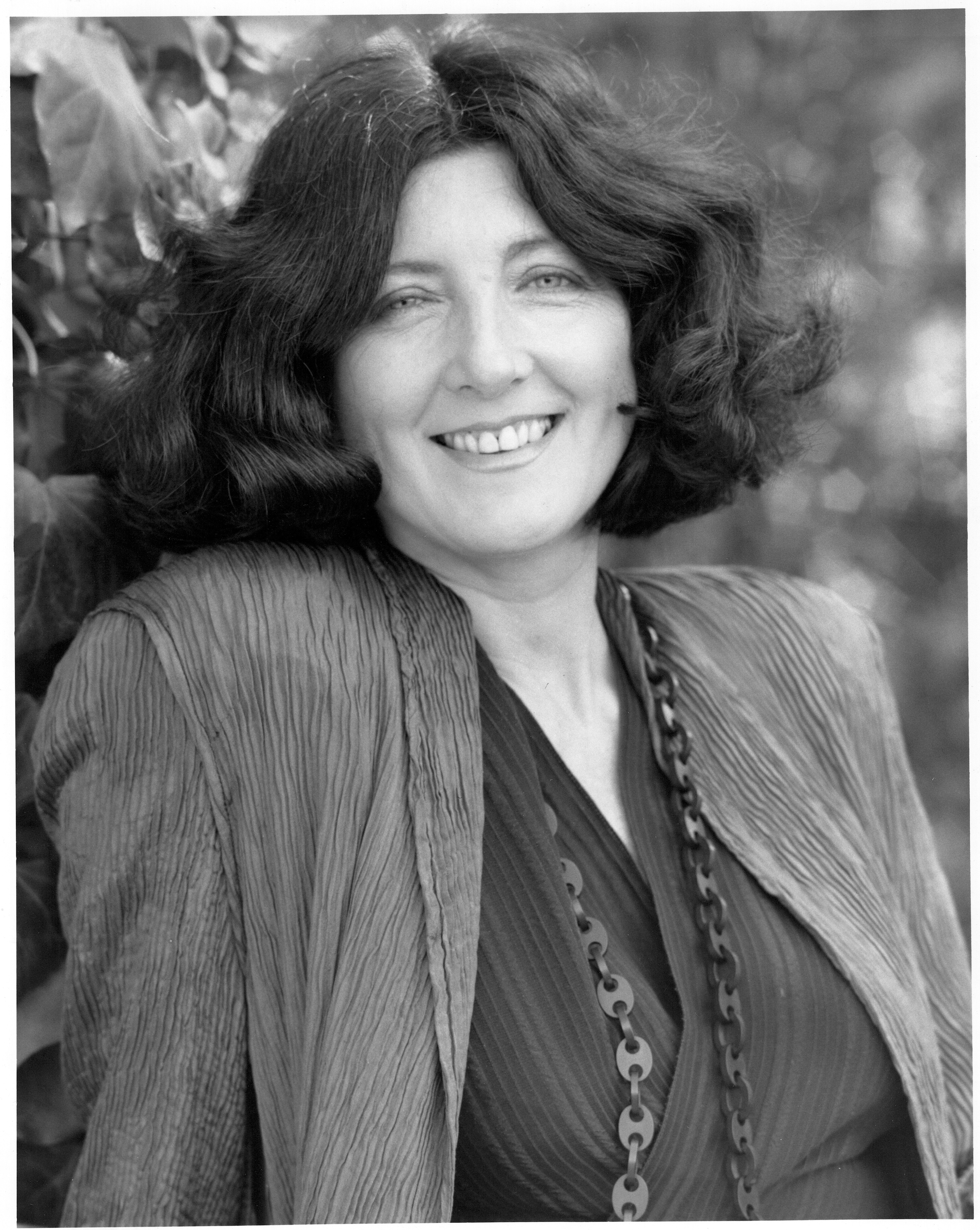
- Born: 1937; Preston, Lancashire, England
- Died: 15 September 2015 (aged 77–78); Los Gatos, California
- Education: Nottingham School of Art
- Occupation: Fashion designer

Marian Clayden (1937-2015) was an artist and fashion designer from Preston, Lancashire. She attended Nottingham School of Art and trained to be a teacher before moving to Australia with her husband Roger and their two children. She began to experiment with textiles in her kitchen and was soon exhibiting and selling her work. In 1967 she moved her family to Los Gatos, California where she collaborated with costumier Bob Mackie. Before starting her own company, Clayden, inc., she worked with two of Cecil Beaton's designers and the McBerman's Costume Company in London. Later she worked with New York based fashion designers Georgio di Sant’Angelo and Mary McFadden.

Clayden's hand dyed fabrics and clothes have been shown in the Smithsonian, the Metropolitan Museum of Art and the Fine Arts Museums of San Francisco. Her clients included Hollywood stars such as Lisa Marie Presley, Meryl Streep, Sigourney Weaver and Catherine Zeta-Jones.

== Professional life ==
Clayden was born into a family of artists and craftspeople near Preston in the North of England and trained to be an oil painter. Both her grandfathers were silversmiths who died young due to respiratory issues associated with silver work.

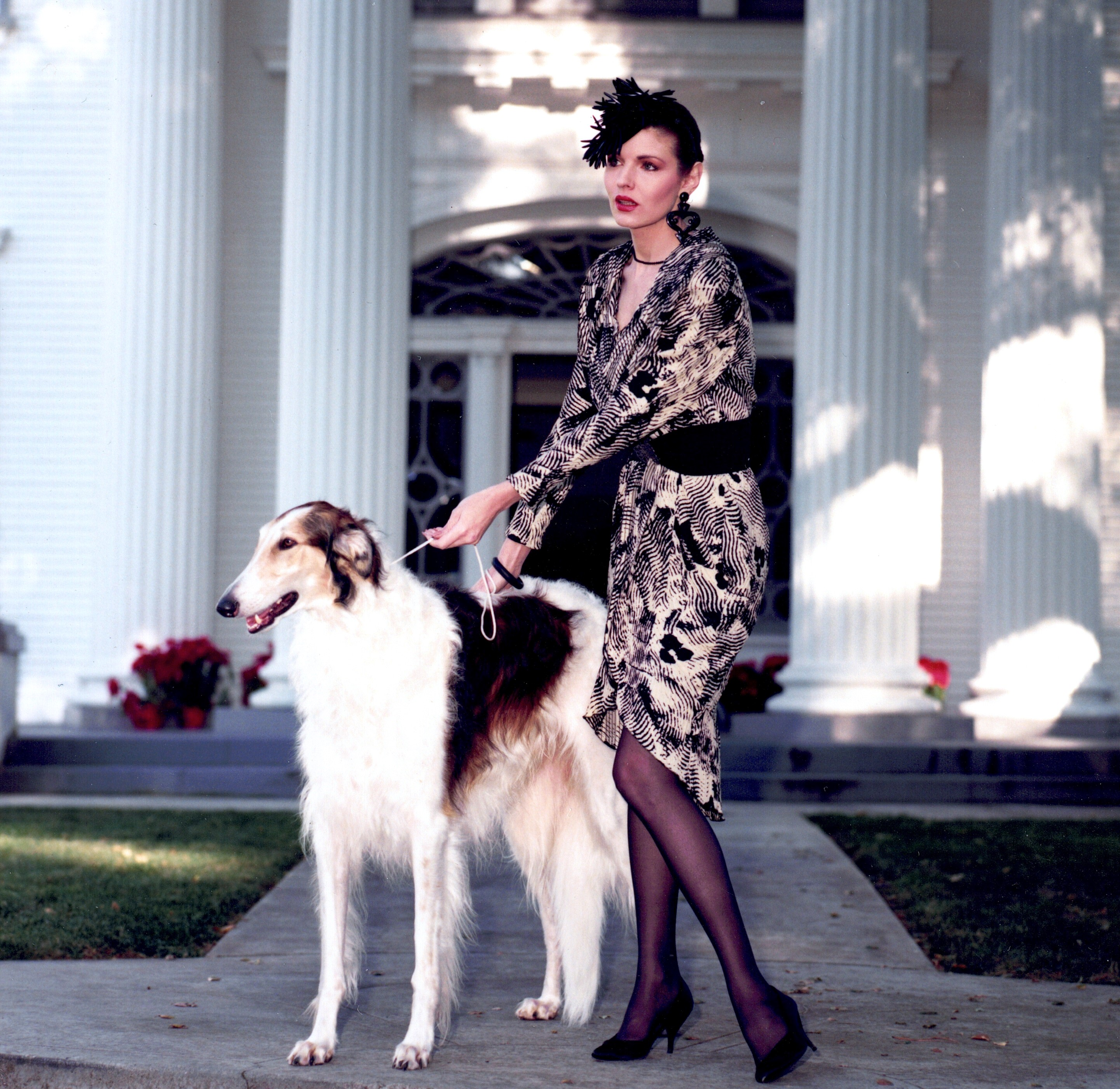
Example of Marian Clayden's innovative 'toaster print' created with a sandwich toaster

She worked as a primary teacher in the UK before moving to Australia with her young family. She was always interested in fashion and began experimenting with dyes and cloth in 1964. She made wall hangings in Australia before moving again to the USA in 1967 and founding her fashion house Clayden, inc. in Los Gatos, California. where she experienced a "spiritual freedom" that enabled her to "create work that combines the present and the past into a continuum". Her first fashion collection was in 1981 though her work was shown internationally since 1970. She said later that there was no specific moment when she became a fashion designer. Her innovative 'toaster prints' introduced in the mid 1980s were created using a sandwich toaster.

In 1987, with her clothing carried by luxury boutiques including Obiko in San Francisco and Bergdorf Goodman in New York, Clayden, inc. surpassed $1 million in sales. A year later, in 1988, that had doubled with the company projecting sales of $2 million.

With a long term interest in Japanese textiles her work was included in an exhibition about the American interpretation of the Shibori technique which she also employed designing costumes for the Broadway musical Hair after she was contacted by the set designer Nancy Potts. Most of her clothes design used some form of simplified shibori. Clayden used the South East Asian word “plangi” to describe her tie-dying and dipping technique.

In 1995, a year after suffering a brain aneurysm, Clayden won the Golden Shears Award for Fashion.

Clayden, inc. closed in 2005. Clayden died on 15 September 2015 after a period of illness at the age of 78.
