= Walthamstow College of Art =

Art school in Walthamstow, England

Coordinates: 51.591°N 0.010°W

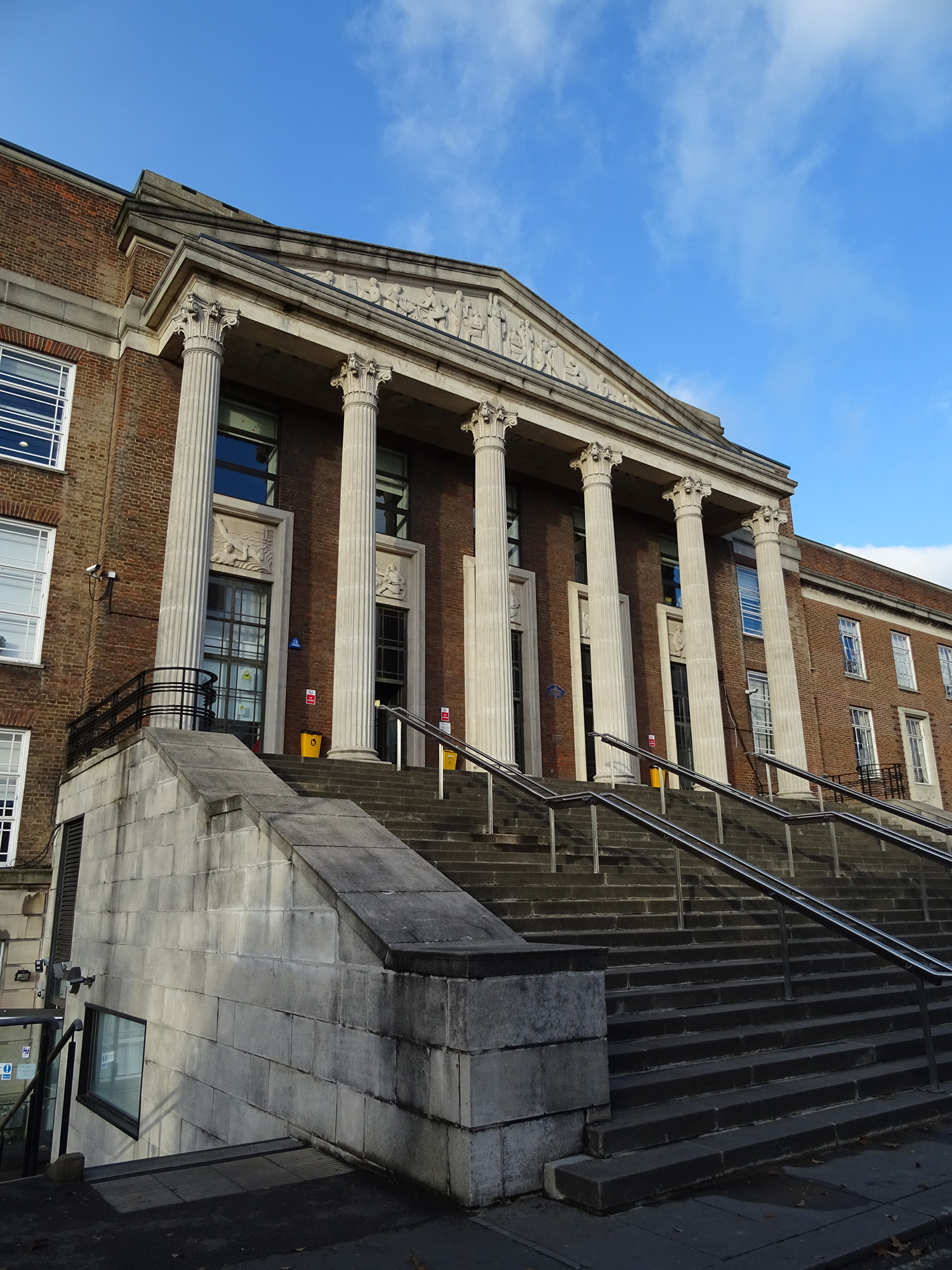
The college building, now Waltham Forest College

Walthamstow College of Art was an art school based in Walthamstow, north-east London. In the 1970s, it was merged into North East London Polytechnic and is now part of the University of East London (UEL). UEL's School of Architecture and the Visual Arts, is based at its Docklands Campus.

In 2017, The William Morris Gallery hosted an exhibition, 'Be Magnificent', documenting some of its most famous alumni.

== Notable alumni ==
- Audrey Barker, artist
- Ian Dury, musician
- Marion Foale, fashion designer
- Peter Greenaway, film director, studied 1962-65
- John Lloyd (graphic designer)
- Ken Russell, film director
- Vivian Stanshall, musician
- Sally Tuffin, fashion designer and ceramicist
- Valerie Wiffen, painter

== Notable staff ==
- Peter Blake, artist
- Daphne Brooker
- Margaret Green, painter
