= Foale and Tuffin =

English fashion design business

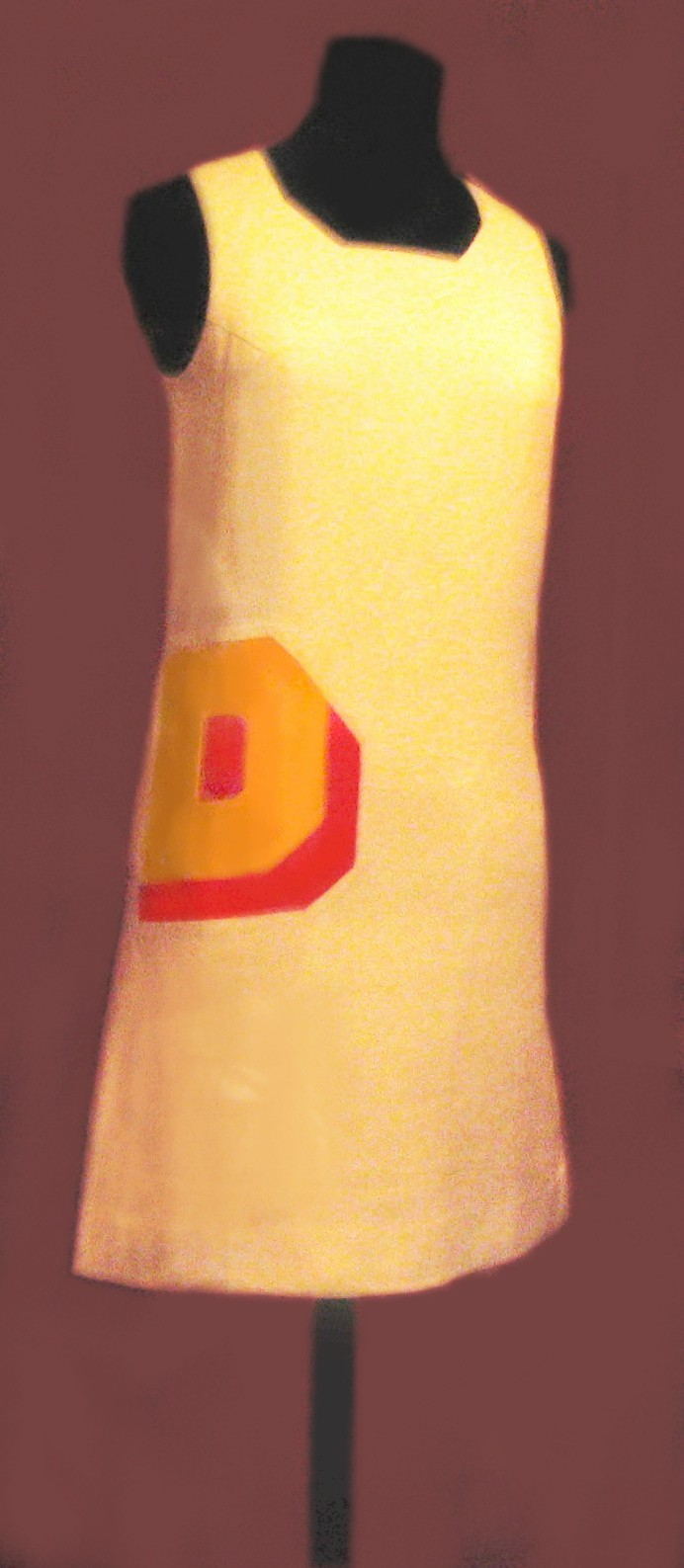
'Double D' Foale & Tuffin dress, 1966.

Foale and Tuffin was an English fashion design business established in London in 1961 by Marion Foale and Sally Tuffin. The label became a part of the 1960s Swinging London scene.

== Company history ==
The designers had both studied at the Royal College of Art, graduating in 1961. Foale and Tuffin was born after they made an appointment to show two dresses to a buyer at Woollands 21 shop, next door to Harvey Nichols, after hearing they were looking for merchandise from young designers. Foale and Tuffin took three floors of a narrow house and shopfront in Carnaby Street. Shunning Paris fashion, they turned their design focus towards ‘fun’ clothes. They became known for their tailoring, creating long lean suits and coats, such as those worn by Susannah York in Kaleidoscope. By 1963, Foale and Tuffin had fulfilled their ambition of running a successful business without the help of a man.

In 1962 Vogue magazine found their work, and chose a dress to be photographed. David Bailey took the shot, resulting in Foale and Tuffin's Vogue debut. Foale and Tuffin became a regular fixture of Marit Allen's groundbreaking 'Young Ideas' section in British Vogue, along with many other young designers such as John Bates, Bill Gibb, Gerald McCann, and Jean Muir. In addition to publishing their work and promoting it, Allen showed her support by wearing the clothes herself. Her Foale and Tuffin wardrobe was sold at auction in 2010.

In 1963, Foale and Tuffin set up their first real premises in a little walkway called Marlborough Court, off Carnaby Street. Originally workrooms, this became their first shop.

As well as designing for the British market, along with Mary Quant, Foale and Tuffin designed for the large American retail chain J C Penney. They also designed for the Puritan Fashion Corporation under a label called Paraphernalia, for which Betsey Johnson was already a designer. They embarked on whistle stop publicity tours around America, including Breakfast TV.

The last Foale and Tuffin collection, Coco Frills, came out in 1972.

A book was published in October 2009, Foale and Tuffin: The Sixties. A Decade in Fashion by Iain R. Webb, published by ACC Publishing Group.
