= Ronald Paterson =

Scottish fashion designer

Ronald Paterson (1917 – 1993) was a Paris-trained Scottish fashion designer.

In 1936, he left Scotland to study at the Piccadilly Institute of Design in London. In 1947, he opened his own couture house and had a lot of success in the following 20 years; his fashion house closed in 1968. He had many important clients, including the family of Castle Howard. In 1966 he won a fashion award from The Sunday Times. He also worked as a fashion consultant to a number of films, including The Spy Who Loved Me (1977) and The Adventurers.

His archives are at the Victoria and Albert Museum.
