= Bill Gibb =

Scottish fashion designer (1943–1988)

- Gibb in 1976 wearing knitwear of his own design
- Born: 23 January 1943; New Pitsligo, Aberdeenshire, Scotland
- Died: 3 January 1988 (aged 44); London, England
- Education: Saint Martin's School of Art & Royal College of Art
- Known for: Fashion design

William Elphinstone Gibb (23 January 1943 – 3 January 1988) was a Scottish fashion designer who became renowned in the 1960s and 70s for his unusual and flattering designs.

== Early life and education ==
Gibb was born near New Pitsligo, a small village in Aberdeenshire in Scotland to George and Jessie (née Reid) Gibb, the eldest of their seven children. Gibb, known affectionately as "Billy", was brought up by his maternal grandparents on their farm, Lochpots, near Fraserburgh. In 1960, Gibb's family bought the dairy farm at Smiddyhill in Fraserburgh, before finally settling in Netherton, in New Pitsligo.

Gibb's parents retired from farmwork in 1976, and latterly ran a bed and breakfast in the village of New Pitsligo. They celebrated their sixty-fifth wedding anniversary on 27 December 2009, shortly before George Gibb's death in 2010.

He was educated at Fraserburgh Academy. His teachers encouraged him to apply for art school in London, and so, in 1962, Gibb went to Saint Martin's School of Art. After graduating top of his class, Gibb was awarded a scholarship to the Royal College of Art, but before completing his degree, he left to start up in business.

== Fashion design ==
In 1967 Gibb was one of six young designers invited to present their designs in New York, which led to a three-month research tour of the United States with his then boyfriend, the artist and textile designer Kaffe Fassett, who would remain a very close friend and design collaborator. On his return to London, Gibb and a group of friends had co-founded the Alice Paul boutique, for which Gibb designed typically late 1960s outfits of miniskirts and long coats, whilst his friends handled the marketing and manufacture. Between 1969 and 1972, as a freelance designer, Gibb designed for the London fashion house Baccarat. In 1972 Gibb launched his own company, Bill Gibb Fashion Group, which ran until 1988, and in 1975 he opened his first shop in London, on Bond Street.

Beatrix Miller of Vogue selected one of Gibb's designs for Baccarat, a pleated tartan skirt and printed blouse worn with a Kaffe Fassett knitted waistcoat, as the 1970 Dress of the Year. Gibb's design was described as the epitome of the new emerging trend for romantic eclecticism in British fashion design, as well as demonstrating how traditional handicrafts, such as hand-knits, were becoming acceptable for mainstream fashion. That same year, Harrods opened a dedicated area for Gibb's designs, calling it the "Bill Gibb Room", and the model Twiggy approached Gibb to create several historically-inspired dresses for her. She wore a "Renaissance" evening dress featuring printed textiles based on 1520s Hans Holbein drawings to the Daily Mirror's Fashion Celebrity Dinner in 1970. Another gown made from various patterned textiles that Twiggy wore to the 1971 film première of The Boy Friend drew a great deal of media attention.

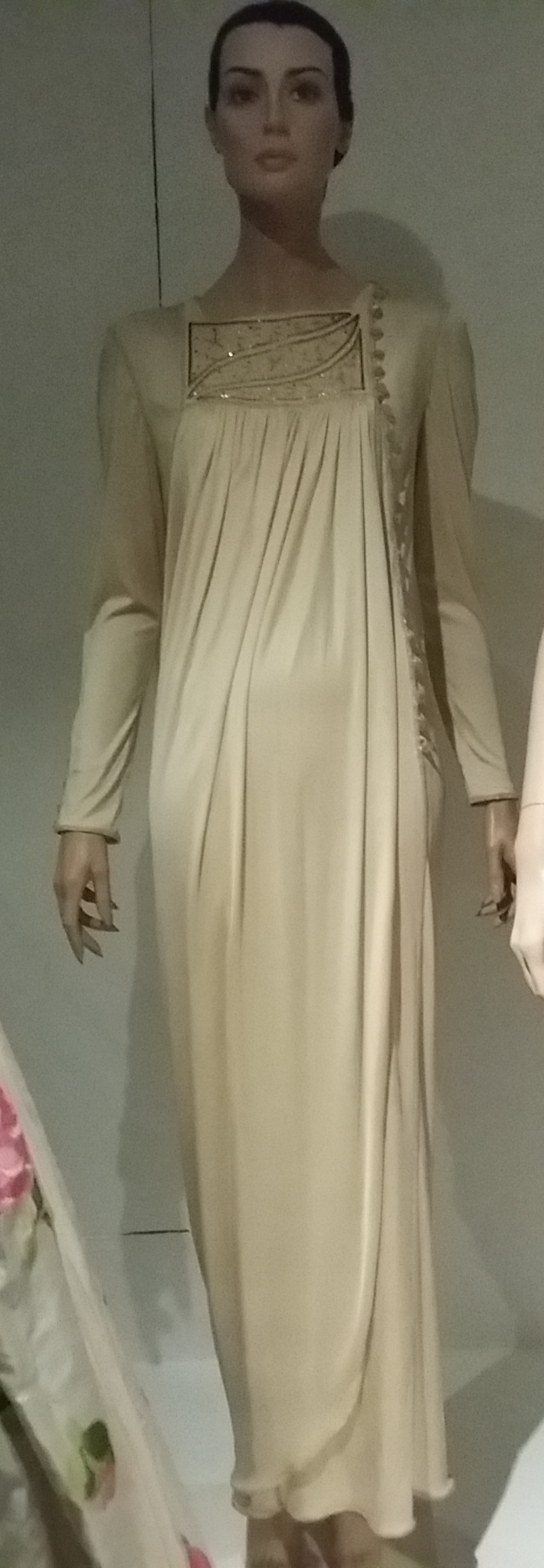
Late 1970s gown by Bill Gibb

Gibb presented his first collection under his own name in 1972. His fantastical creations were based on nature, with unexpected combinations of fur, feathers, printed leather, and brightly coloured clinging fabrics. However, his most important work was in knitwear, co-designed with Kaffe Fassett and hand-knitted by Mildred Boulton. Due to massive demand, Gibb found a manufacturer in Leicestershire who was willing to take on the challenge of machine-knitting Fassett's extraordinarily complicated, multi-coloured woollen designs, although Boulton continued to hand-knit one-off designs. During the 1970s, Gibb did take on other design commissions, including creating a range of shoe designs for the high-end shoe manufacturer Rayne. Later, in the 1980s, Gibb collaborated with another Leicestershire manufacturer, Annette Carol, to produce acrylic knitwear using a jacquard technique.

Gibb was not a good businessperson, and his business was not financially successful, and collapsed in 1977, 1979 and 1980.

By the 1980s, he was producing small capsule collections as well as designing for individual private clients, and licensing his name to manufacturers and promotions, including a mail-order ensemble for readers of the UK magazine Women's Journal. In 1985, he made a comeback with his "Bronze Age" collection, co-designed with Kaffe Fassett and featuring hats by Stephen Jones, however it did not attract buyers.

== Personal life and death ==
Gibb was described as "one of the most gentle, kindly and considerate human beings I have ever met" and a "man without malice" by the journalist Jack Webster. Twiggy described him as her "knight in shining armour", and as a "sweet, sunny farm boy in baggy corduroys whom I absolutely adored".

For a while in the late 1960s, Gibb was in a relationship with Kaffe Fassett, who remained a close friend and colleague to the end.

At the time of Gibb's death of bowel cancer in 1988, the Daily Mail reported that he died of AIDS, which was strongly denied by his friends and family. Webster, writing for the Glasgow Herald also strongly refuted these claims, pointing out that the hospital had confirmed it was bowel cancer. Despite this, Bill Gibb is still sometimes listed as an AIDS death.

== Legacy ==
In 2008, the designer Giles Deacon cited Bill Gibb's designs as a significant influence on his work. Alongside Deacon, John Galliano has also spoken out in praise of Bill Gibb's work for reflecting the "romantic essence of British style".

In 2024, the last remaining section of the old Fraserburgh Academy building was renovated into an apartment complex, which was named after him.

In 2026, Bloomsbury published a book titled Refashioning Bill Gibb for the 21st Century. Edited by Shane Strachan and Josephine Steed, the book chronicled the work of the designer through a series of interviews and essays by authors such as Iain R. Webb, Jeena Sharma, and Christine Rew.

It also featured over 100 illustrations and reexamined his creative decisions through the lens of cultural appropriation, sustainability and other contemporary concerns.

== Exhibitions ==
- Retrospective exhibition at Aberdeen Art Gallery, 1990.
- Bill Gibb: A Personal Journey at the Fashion Museum, Bath (17 October 2008 – 2009)
- Billy: Bill Gibb's Moment in Time at the Fashion and Textile Museum (November 2008 – January 2009)
- Permanent gallery at Fraserburgh Heritage Centre, Aberdeenshire.

Bill Gibb's work is represented in the permanent collection of many museums, including the Victoria and Albert Museum in London, Manchester City Galleries, the Walker Art Gallery in Liverpool, the Metropolitan Museum of Art in New York, as well as those listed above.
