= Marion Foale =

British fashion designer

Marion Foale

Marion A Foale (born 13 March 1939 in Edmonton, London) is an English artist and fashion designer. With Sally Tuffin, she formed one half of the design team behind the 1960s fashion label Foale and Tuffin.

Born in London, Foale attended Ilford County High School for Girls, where she entered (and won) several painting contests. After school, she attended Walthamstow College of Art. Two years later, she realized that her love of art would never translate into a career that would sustain her, and decided to attend fashion school.

== Early years ==
In 1959, she began studying fashion at Royal College of Art under Professor Janey Ironside. Foale studied the three-dimensional construction of garments and how differing fabrics behave by working freely on the tailor’s dummy, making a toile (mock up in calico).

In 1960, during her second year at the RCA, Foale was asked to submit designs for the Queen’s mantle, worn for the Order of the British Empire dedication ceremony; previously a man had always performed this ceremony but, as the Queen did not wear trousers, a feminine ensemble was required. Foale’s design was chosen. It is still worn to this day.

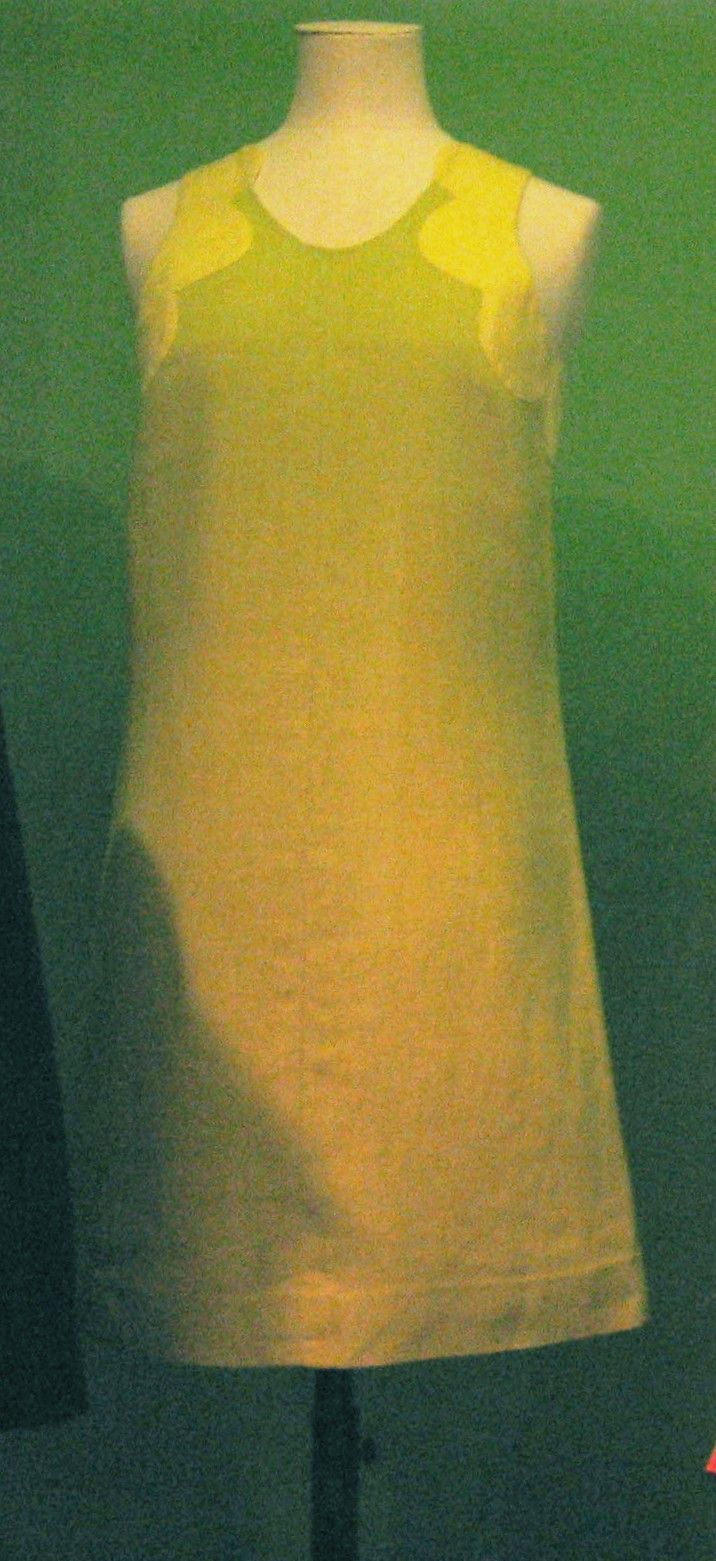
Foale & Tuffin dress, 1966

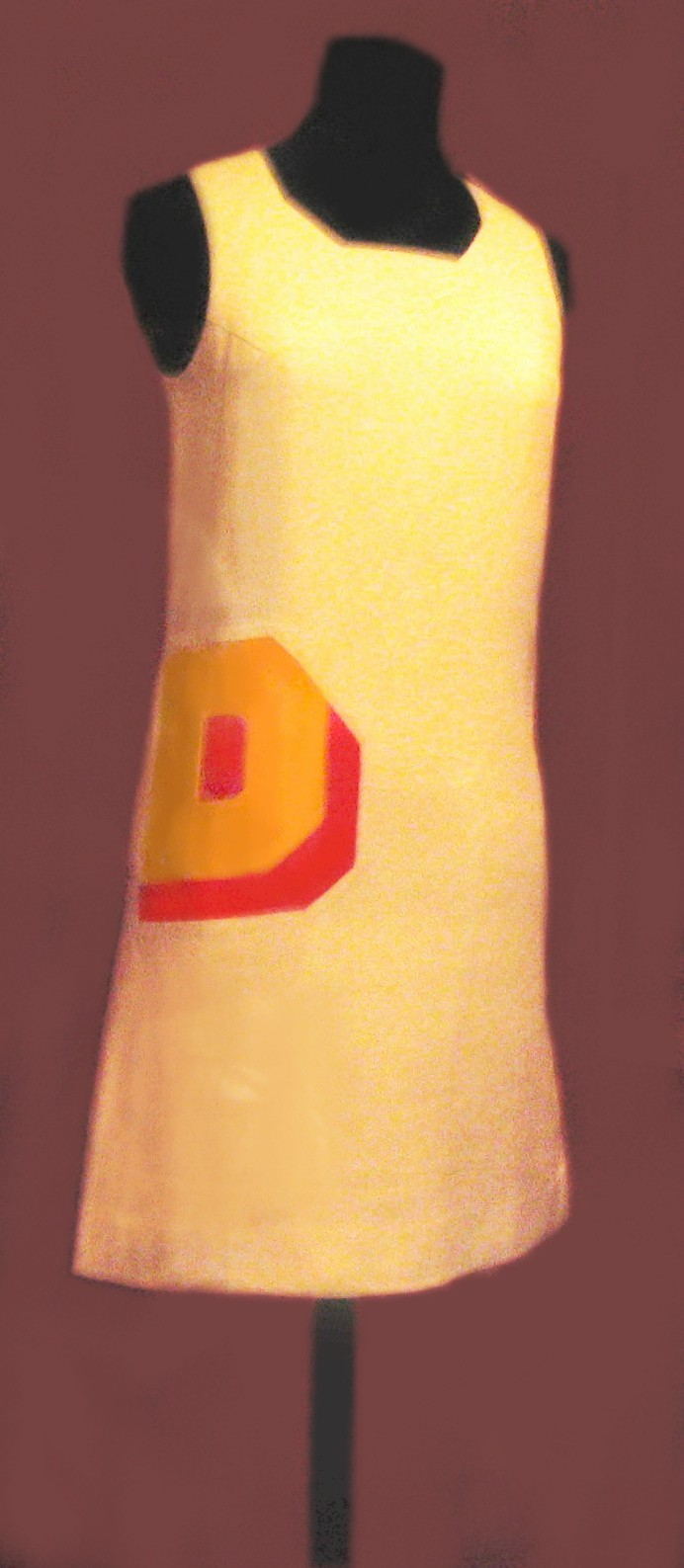
Foale & Tuffin dress, 1966

== Foale and Tuffin ==
In 1961 Foale and her friend, Sally Tuffin, launched the Foale and Tuffin fashion label. They became known for their tailoring, creating long lean suits and coats, such as those worn by Susannah York in Kaleidoscope. The label ran very successfully until 1972, when Foale and Tuffin decided to part company.

== Foale Ltd. ==
Some time after Foale and Tuffin dissolved, Foale decided to move into knitwear. Hand knit was important at this time and everybody was knitting sweaters with pictures on them, or Aran and Fair Isle styles. These garments were two-dimensional, flat shapes, more or less like a "T" shape, and Foale wanted to create timeless designs with the emphasis on perfect detail. She soon realised that there was a market for the designs she was creating and so was launched Foale Ltd. In 1985 Foale produced a knitting pattern book which was designed to be simple, with the most desirable, easy patterns for people to knit at home, using four ply and double knitting. She then moved into knitting three-dimensionally, making garments that were tailored and shaped like a jacket. In 1987, Foale opened a shop in Hinde Street, near Marylebone High Street.
