= Franco Rosso filmography =

This article is a list of films directed, produced or written by Franco Rosso.

== Filmography ==
=== Film ===
Year	Title	Role	Notes	Ref(s)
1967	Rainbows Are Insured against Old Age	Director	Produced by the Royal College of Art	
1968	Dream Weaver	Director	Co-directed with David Thomson, produced by the Royal College of Art	
1970	Kes	Consultant		
1970	Reggae	Editor	Directed by Horace Ové	
1972	Right to Work March	Consultant		
1973	English As a Second Language (First and Second Phase Teaching)	Editor	Directed by Alan Murgatroyd, produced by Manchester Polytechnic	
1973	The Mangrove Nine	Director, co-producer	Co-produced with John La Rose	
1975	This Is 'the Place'	Editor	Directed by Peter Selby	
1977	Truth and Logic	Editor	DIrected by Charles Crichton	
1978	The Bond of Breastfeeding	Editor	Directed by Julian Aston	
1978	Dinosaurs in the Playground	Editor	Directed by Clare Calder-Marshall, produced by the National Film School	
1978	News from Nowhere	Editor	Co-directed by Bren Simson and Pasco Macfarlane, produced by the National Film School	
1979	Dread Beat and Blood	Director, producer, screenwriter	Documentary about Linton Kwesi Johnson, co-written with Linton Kwesi Johnson	
1980	The Templeton Prize	Editor	Directed by Mischa Scorer	
1980	Runaway Summer	Editor	Directed by Bren Simson	
1980	Babylon	Director, screenwriter		
1981	How Does a Computer Work?	Editor	Produced by Video Arts	
1981	Braithwaite's Battle with the Banks	Editor	Directed by Charles Crichton	
1985	Sixty-four Day Hero: A Boxer's Tale	Director, producer	Documentary about Randolph Turpin, co-produced with Joanna Smith	
1988	The Nature of the Beast	Director		

=== Television ===
Year	Title	Role	Notes	Ref(s)
1973	The World About Us	Editor	"King Carnival"	
1978	Black and Blue	Screenwriter	Co-writer with Martin Stellman	
1979	Television World	Editor	"The Ratings Business"	
1981	Playhouse	Editor	"Only a Game", directed by Les Blair	
1983	Ian Dury	Director, producer	Documentary about Ian Dury	
1983	Salt on the Snake's Tail	Director	Series of plays by Farrukh Dhondy	
1984	The Caribbean in Crisis: The West Indies One Year after the Grenada Invasion	Producer	Directed by Greg Lanning	
1987	The Media Show	Director	4 episodes	
1987	40 Minutes	Producer	"Struggle for Stonebridge", documentary on the Harlesden People's Community Council	
1989	Omnibus	Producer	"The Art of Survival Tim Rollins and Kos", documentary about Tim Rollins and K.O.S.	
1989	The Artist's Eye	Producer	"John Kiki, Painter", documentary about John Kiki	
1990	Centrepoint	Producer	Directed by Piers Haggard	
1991	True Stories	Director	"Lucha Libre"	
1995	The Black Bag	Director	"Money Drugs Lock-up"	
