= List of works by Arthur Bowen Davies =

The following is an incomplete list of the works by American artist Arthur Bowen Davies.

== Works ==
Image	Title	Date	Technique	Dimensions	Current location
	Untitled (Seated Woman)	1880	watercolor and gouache on paper	11 mm x 7.88 mm	The Phillips Collection
	Two Women Reading in a Field	1888	watercolor and gouache over graphite	267 mm x 482 mm	Cleveland Museum of Art
	Along the Erie Canal	1890	oil on canvas	18.30 mm x 40.30 mm	The Phillips Collection
	Rose to Rose	1890-1900	oil on canvas	667 × 1019 mm	Yale University Art Gallery
	Flora	early 1890s	oil on canvas	267 mm x 159 mm	Barnes Foundation
	Music in the Fields	1890s	oil on canvas	206 mm x 514 mm	Barnes Foundation
	Viola Obligato	1895	oil on wood panel	14 mm x 11 mm	The Phillips Collection
	Every Saturday	1895-1896	oil on canvas	457 mm x 760 mm	Brooklyn Museum
	Visions of Glory	1896	oil on canvas	10.75 mm x 15.88 mm	The Phillips Collection
	Children of Yesteryear	1897	oil on canvas	634 mm x 510 mm	Brooklyn Museum
	On the Cliffs	1898	oil on canvas	565 mm x 433 mm	Smithsonian American Art Museum
	Evensong	1898	oil on canvas	560 mm x 432 mm	Smithsonian American Art Museum
	Shy as a Rabbit	1900	oil on canvas	565 mm x 438 mm	Private Collection
	Cherubian Children	1900	pastel over black watercolor with touches of crayon or colored pencil	305 mm x 230 mm	Brooklyn Museum
	A Greater Morning	1900-1905	oil on canvas	59 mm x 71.5 mm	Smithsonian American Art Museum
	Hermes and the Infant Dionysus	1900-1915	oil on canvas	610 mm x 1400 mm	Cleveland Museum of Art
	Full-Orbed Moon	1903	oil on canvas	586 mm x 400 mm	Art Institute of Chicago
	The Flood	1903	oil on canvas	18.30 mm x 30 mm	The Phillips Collection
	Children, Dogs and Pony	1905	oil on canvas	22.13 mm x 17.38 mm	The Phillips Collection
	Many Waters	1905	Oil on paper adhered to canvas	17 mm x 22 mm	The Phillips Collection
	Lake and Island, Sierra Nevada	1905	Oil on canvas	457 mm x 1016 mm	Private Collection
	Leda and the Dioscuri	1905	Oil on canvas	660 mm x 1016 mm	Private Collection
	Pacific Parnassus, Mount Tamalpais	1905	Oil on canvas		de Young Museum
	The Lure of the Chase	1905	Oil on canvas	457 mm x 1016 mm	The Huntington Library, Art Museum, and Botanical Gardens
	Unicorns (Legend-Sea Calm)	1906	oil on canvas	464 mm x 1022 mm	Metropolitan Museum of Art
	Springtime of Delight	1906	oil on canvas	18.13 mm x 40.13 mm	The Phillips Collection
	Semele or Fireflies	1907	oil on canvas	191 × 375 mm	Art Institute of Chicago
	A Measure of Dreams	1908	oil on canvas	457 × 762 mm	Metropolitan Museum of Art
	Homage to the Ocean	1908	oil on canvas	713 mm x 588 mm	Brooklyn Museum
	Across the Harbor	1908	oil on canvas	431.8 mm x 558.8 mm	Indianapolis Museum of Art
	Artemis	by 1909	oil on canvas	410 mm x 333 mm	Metropolitan Museum of Art
	Corridor of Summer	1910	oil on canvas	460.4 mm x 762 mm	Dallas Museum of Art
	Tiptoeing Youth	1910	oil on canvas	459 mm x 1011 mm	Whitney Museum of American Art
	Sybil Returning to Cumae	1910	oil on canvas	584 mm x 711 mm	Whitney Museum of American Art
	Crescendo	1910	oil on canvas	457 mm x 1016 mm	Whitney Museum of American Art
	Maya, Mirror of Illusions	1910	oil on canvas	664 mm x 1019 mm	Art Institute of Chicago
	Twilight Travelling	1910	oil on canvas	281 mm x 557 mm	Whitney Museum of American Art
	Horses of Attica	after 1910	oil on canvas	203.2 mm x 381 mm	The Phillips Collection
	Four Figures	1911	oil on canvas	406 mm x 508 mm	Flint Institute of Arts
	Clothed in Dominion	1912	oil on canvas	619 mm x 1537 mm	Rhode Island School of Design Museum
	Day of Good Fortune	1914	oil on canvas	451 mm x 749 mm	The Whitney Museum of American Art
	The Hesitation of Orestes	1915	oil on canvas	26 mm x 40.13 mm	The Phillips Collection
	Synchromy with Figures	1916	oil on canvas	406.4 mm x 258.82 mm	
	Earths Throat Edge	1920	oil on canvas	456 mm x 761 mm	Private Collection
	The Dancer	1925	pastel on paper	749 mm x 362 mm	Private Collection
	Italian Hill Town	1925	oil on canvas	65.7 mm x 101.3 mm	Metropolitan Museum of Art
	Elihu Vedder	undated	charcoal heightened with white on gray paper	270 mm x 220 mm	Private Collection
	Gondolas	undated	Watercolor and gouache on paper	184.15 x 273.05 mm	The Phillips Collection
	Louvre	undated	Watercolor, gouache, and charcoal on blue wove paper	283 mm x 448 mm	Metropolitan Museum of Art
	The Dancers	undated	oil on canvas	561.98 mm x 438.15 mm	The Phillips Collection
	Midsummer Evening	undated	oil on canvas	660 mm x 1067 mm	Private Collection
	Portrait of the Artist's Son	undated	oil on canvas	279 mm x 406 mm	Private Collection
	The Golden Stream	undated	oil on canvas	431.8 mm x 565.15 mm	
	Standing Nude	undated	Pastel on buff paper	285.75 mm x 209.55 mm	Private Collection
	Elysian Fields	undated	oil on canvas	457.2 mm x 762 mm	The Phillips Collection
	The Birth of the Green	undated	oil on canvas	152.4 x 384.18 mm	The Phillips Collection
	Dew Drops	undated	oil on canvas	330.2 x 396.88 mm	The Phillips Collection
	Dionysos	undated	oil on canvas	760 mm x 455 mm	Princeton University Art Museum
	Nude by a Waterfall	undated	oil on canvas	431.8 mm x 558.8 mm	Herbert F. Johnson Museum of Art
	Sacrifice	undated	oil on canvas	229 mm x 457 mm	Private Collection
	Source	undated	oil on canvas	1018 mm x 665 mm	Princeton University Art Museum
	Silence, Waterfall and Forest	undated	oil on canvas	756 mm x 445 mm	Dayton Art Institute
	Nymphs in a Landscape	undated	oil on canvas	508 mm x 635 mm	
	The Voyage	undated	oil on canvas	13.25 mm x 16.25 mm	The Phillips Collection
