= Barbara Sorensen =

- Born: February 7, 1945 (age 81); Racine, Wisconsin
- Education: University of Wisconsin-Madison
- Occupations: Sculptor, artist
- Style: Mixed Media, Installation art
- Website: www.barbarasorensen.com

Barbara Sorensen (born February 7, 1945) is an American artist. Her sculptures and multimedia installations mimic geological formations and natural landscapes, and are made from clay, metal, and resin. Sorensen works from art studios in Snowmass Village, Colorado and Winter Park, Florida.

Past exhibitions of Sorensen's artwork include a traveling retrospective called Topographies that was exhibited at the Orlando Museum of Art in January 2012, and a solo exhibition called Barbara Sorensen: Elemental at the Racine Art Museum in Racine, Wisconsin in 2013.

== Background ==
Sorensen grew up in Racine, Wisconsin. She studied as an undergraduate at the University of Wisconsin, Madison, where her adviser was ceramic artist, Don Reitz. In 1969, Sorensen received her Bachelor of Science degree in Art education. Sorensen worked as an art teacher from 1968 – 1971.

Starting in 1972, Sorensen worked alongside mentors and renowned ceramic artists Rudy Autio, Paul Soldner, Peter Voulkos, as well as former college adviser, Don Reitz.

== Artwork ==
Sorensen makes sculptures and multimedia installations from clay, resin, and metal. Sorensen draws artistic inspiration from the natural world and classical elements. Sorensen is known for going on hiking adventures in New Zealand, Australia, and the Pyrenees, and from these explorations, Sorensen cultivates her artistic vision. Sorensen often uses the clay slab method in her clay-based sculptural works. In keeping with her interest in the natural environment, the clay slab method closely mimics geological phenomena, including plate tectonics. As Sorensen's work mimics geological phenomena, art critics, including Eleanor Heartney of Art in America, noted an inherent energy in Sorensen's sculptures and installations.

Sorensen began her art career working in clay, and as time has gone on, she has moved towards creating sculptures and large scale sculptural installations with metal and resin, an example being her Dwellings series. The Dwellings sculptures are large, brightly colored aluminum wire vessels.

=== Installation Art ===
In addition to her singular sculptural works, Sorensen creates multimedia installations. Her Foothills installation includes music, video, and sixteen large clay sculptures. The music for the installation was composed by Stella Sung, and the video was created by David Hiser. The Speleothems installation made its premier at the Topographies retrospective at the Orlando Museum of Art. The sculptures that make up the Speleothems installation take their form from stalactite and stalagmite formations found in caves.

=== Artist Statement ===
Sorensen's artist statement describes her inspiration for creating artwork, and is as follows:

“I instinctively respond to the form, surface and texture of the Earth, echoing them in my work. I look at the landscape, interpret and reinterpret it, processing it within, and give it back, transformed.”

== Exhibits ==
In 2012, the Orlando Museum of Art mounted a retrospective of Sorensen's work called Topographies. The solo exhibition highlighted a twenty-year period of Sorensen's artwork, and focused on her resin and metal installations. A traveling exhibition, Topographies was also shown at the Manchester Craftsmen's Guild in Pittsburgh, the Leepa-Rattner Museum of Art in Tarpon Springs, Florida, the Museum of Florida Art, and the Orlando Museum of Art. Past exhibitions include a solo show at the Wichita Center for the Arts in Wichita, Kansas in 2012 called Barbara Sorensen, and at the Racine Art Museum in Racine, Wisconsin in 2013 called Barbara Sorensen: Elemental. Past group exhibitions include the XX-XY/Gender Representation in Art at the Orlando Museum of Art in 2010, and Finding Balance at the Houston Center for Contemporary Craft in Houston, Texas in 2006.

== Private Collections ==
Sorensen's artwork has been collected by museums and organizations, including the Everson Museum of Art, Cornell Fine Arts Museum, San Angelo Museum of Fine Arts, American Museum of Ceramic Art, Flint Institute of Arts, Newark Museum, Racine Art Museum, Orlando Art Museum, Museum of Florida Art, Florida State Capitol Art Collection, Town of Snowmass Village, Orlando Public Art Collection, Shakespeare Theater in Orlando, Florida, Neiman Marcus Corporation, The White House Collection, Washington, D.C., Stetson University, and the University of Central Florida.
