= James Gill (artist) =

American painter (born 1934)

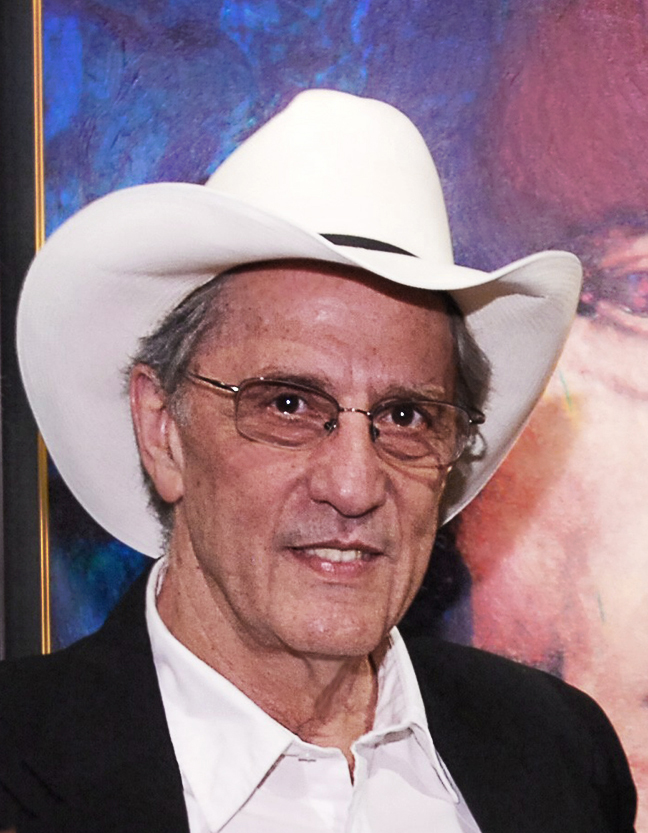
- Gill in 2008
- Born: James Francis Gill; 1934 (age 91–92); Tahoka, Texas, U.S.
- Known for: Painting
- Movement: Pop art
- Spouse: Antoinette Bower

James Francis Gill (born 1934) is an American artist and a proponent of the pop art movement.

In 1962, the Museum of Modern Art included his Marilyn Tryptych into its permanent collection. At the peak of his career, Gill retired. He returned to the art scene around 30 years later.

== Life ==
=== Early works ===
In 1934, Gill was born in Tahoka, Texas, and grew up in San Angelo. His mother, an interior decorator and entrepreneur, encouraged him to have an artistic interest. In high school, Gill and some friends started a rodeo club to pursue their first dream of being cowboys. During his military service, he worked as a draftsman and designed posters. Afterward, back in Texas, he continued his education at the San Angelo College and worked for an architectural firm. In 1959, Gill studied at the University of Texas at Austin, in order to work in architecture design in Odessa afterwards. Then he concentrated on his artistic career.

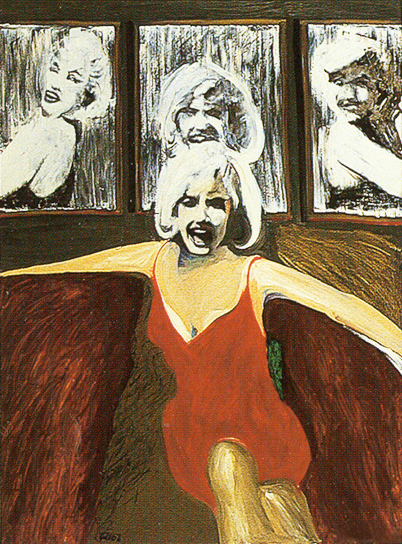
Marilyn Triptych (1962) (left side panel)

In 1962, Gill moved to Los Angeles, carrying in his luggage numerous works of art including Women in Cars which he presented to the Felix Landau Gallery. In November 1962, the Museum of Modern Art in New York – as a gift of John and Dominique de Ménil – added his three-part painting of Marilyn Monroe, titled Marilyn Triptych, to its collection. His drawing Laughing Women in Car and Close-up was shown between drawings by Picasso and Odilon Redon.

In 1965, Gill taught painting at the University of Idaho. His work in these years was often depressing and bleak in tone and mood. Main themes were social and political affairs, such as the Vietnam War. Gill created a series of anti-war paintings which dealt with civil and military leaders. The playwright William Inge described the men in these paintings as "figures of high public reputation, momentarily caught in some nefarious act that will probably destroy their political or professional reputations".

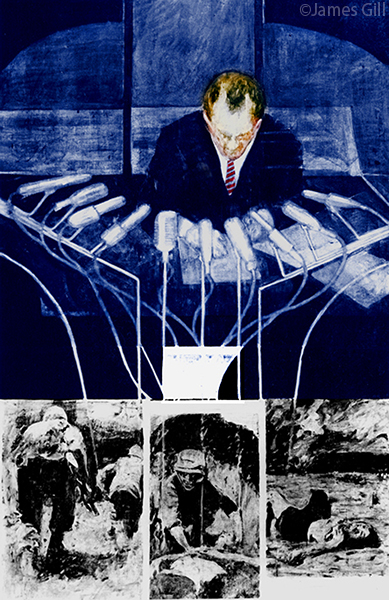
The Machines (1965)

Arising out of a series of anti-war images is the work The Machines. The composition formally joins the media coverage of the United States with the combat conditions in Vietnam. As a draftsman, Gill earned a reputation for handling contemporary issues through photographic images. The combination of his expressionist art and his graphite pencil went against the trend of this time. William Inge described the dark graphite pencil compositions as follows: "His paintings hold a moment of truth, which is of unfortunate beauty and makes memorable". In this way, Gill goes even further than the often apolitical intent of the early movements of pop art. By addressing his paintings for example with the Vietnam War, his works gain an additional socio-critical dimension which provides a much wider range than the mere and superficially not intended criticism of pop art in consumer society.

In 1967, the São Paulo 9 - Environment United States: 1957-1967 in Brazil showed Gill's works with artists such as Andy Warhol and Edward Hopper. This exhibition led to Gill's breakthrough in the international art world. His works were included in the collections of major museums.

In the same year, Gill was asked by Time magazine to portray the Russian Alexander Solzhenitsyn, who had just escaped from a Russian labor camp. Gill produced the image as a four-panel quadriptych. The figure transforms from a faceless into a smiling man who has regained his freedom. Gill: "All the people are political prisoners in the way that they are prisoners of the system in which they are born".

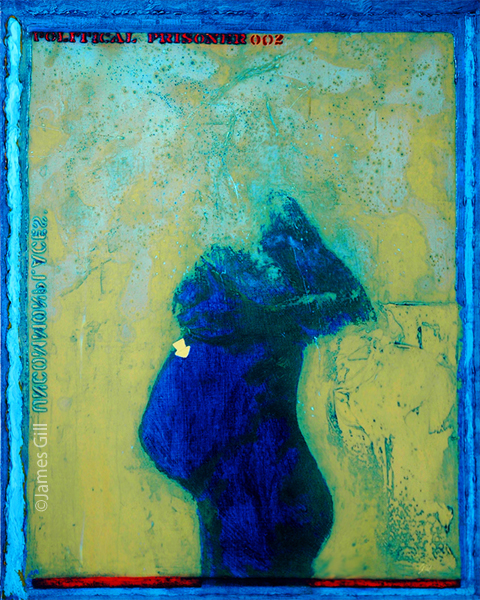
Political Prisoner (1968)

The work hung in the lobby of the Time-Life building for around five years. Gill’s sources have always come from the present. His recognition as an artist has not only been based on the portraits of famous personalities such as John F. Kennedy, Marilyn Monroe and the Beatles, but to a large extent on his works which turned the political power structure and the war itself into question. An important work from this period is Political Prisoner. The series shows the silhouette of a pregnant woman. Her body is the symbol for the longevity of the people and for the possibility of a new beginning of each generation, freed from the mistakes of their parents' generation. But simultaneously, Gill seems to suggest that even the unborn child is caught: Born in the cauldron of a nuclear family, the younger generation could be the unfortunate heir of the world, which they did not even form themselves, but by which it was itself formed.

In 1969, Gill taught at the University of California, Irvine.

In 1970, he was offered a visiting professorship at the University of Oregon. Gill was at the peak of his career, and very popular in the Pop art scene. But many contemporaries saw a profound and complex sense in his works, expressing more than Pop art originally intended: “Gill is a prominent artist of Pop art, although he is too much a painter and treats its subjects in a very emotionally charged way, than only being regarded as a Pop artist".

=== Withdrawal from the art scene ===
In 1972, Gill went surprisingly into a self-imposed exile, in the expectation of being able to maintain a kind of long-distance relationship with the art scene. He wanted to develop his artistic expression, without being delivered to the constraints of the material world. He stated, "at the time I was pretty well strung out on a lot of stuff, strung out on fame and art and the Political Prisoner dilemma (…). So, when I drove up through the California redwoods and up along the coast, the beauty of the place blew my mind and I realized that I didn’t have to live in Los Angeles."

After the professorship in Oregon, Gill sold his house, numerous pictures and drawings, so he could buy land and a house in Whale Gulch in the southern portion of the King Range Wilderness.

=== Rediscovery ===
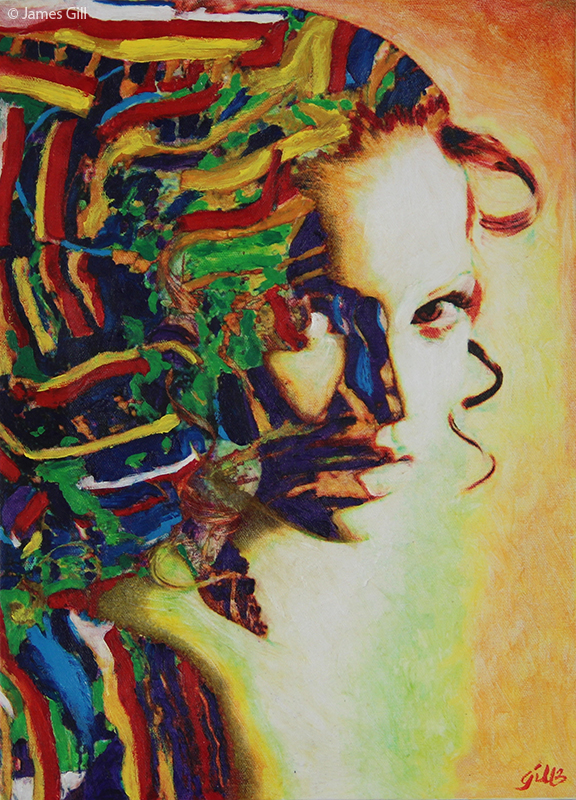
Behind the shadow, restudy (2003)

Parallel to his work as an architectural designer in Northern California, Gill began again with painting in the mid 1980s. He returned to Texas and developed his art, but without going to the public.

However, his life changed dramatically when about ten years later, the art magazine American Way of the Smithsonian American Art Museum called him and asked for an interview. This marked the beginning of his rediscovery, and numerous galleries and museums became aware of him again. Around 1987, Gill started to work with the tools of computer design, using "the computer and the printer as a drawing tool".

For the first time in 2005, a retrospective was held in his hometown San Angelo at the Museum of Fine Arts.

=== Late works ===
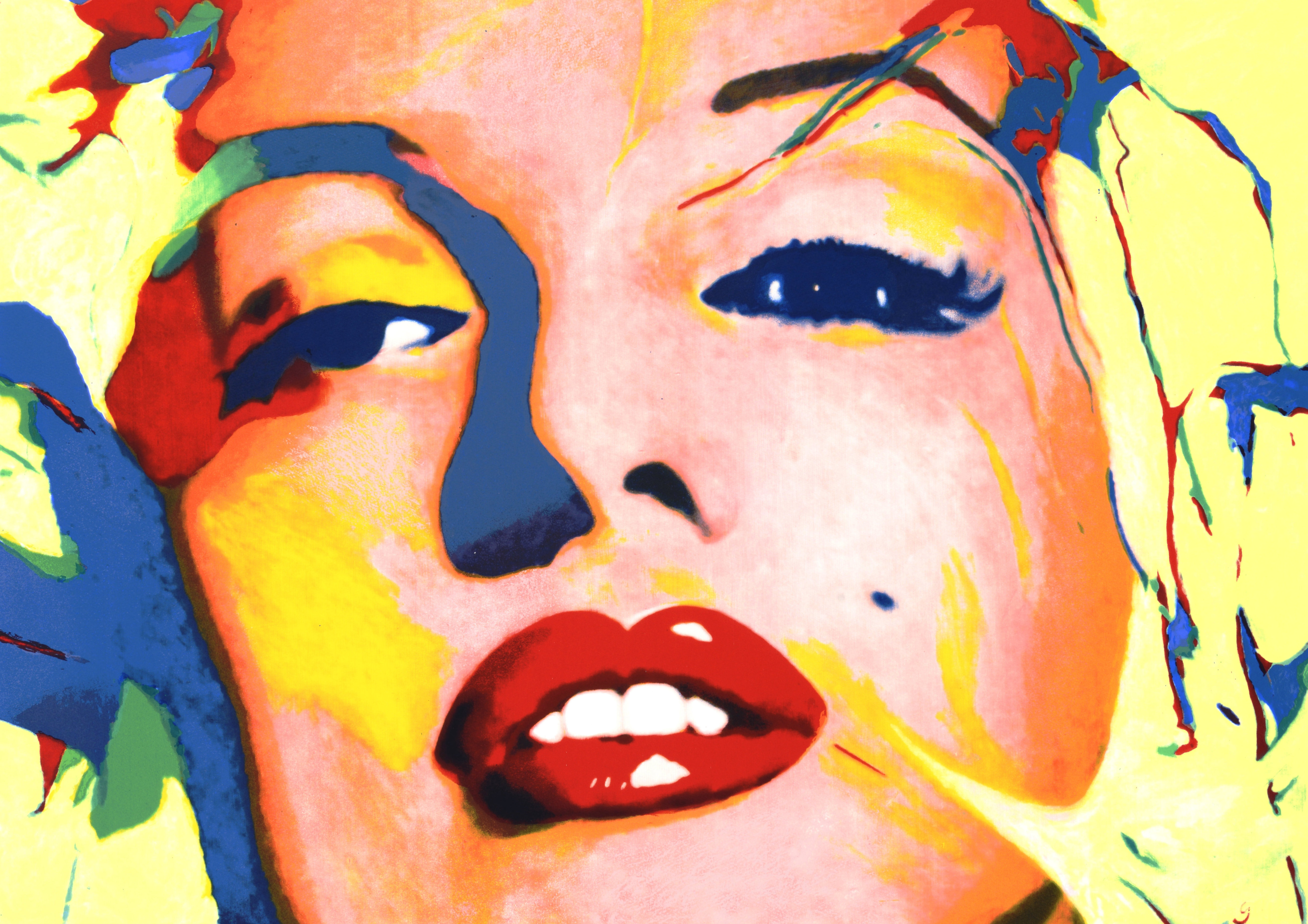
MM a Critique of Mass Iconology - Serigraphy (2013)

Around 2010, Gill's late creative phase began, in which – in contrast to the dominance of political motives in the early works – the artist increased the focus on the presentation of classic Pop art icons such as John Wayne, Paul Newman or Marilyn Monroe. Gill created numerous works of the American film actress who, since his early success with the Marilyn Triptych (which was included in the collection of the Museum of Modern Art even before the works of Andy Warhol) has exerted an unbroken fascination on him.

Gill has described personal acquaintances with Tony Curtis, Kirk Douglas, John Wayne, Jim Morrison, Martin Luther King Jr. and Marlon Brando, as an influence on his work, with these public figures recurring as subjects across his output. His recent work combines realism and abstraction, typically based on photographic source material. He composes his paintings digitally before painting, using a layered technique he calls Metamage or Mixed Media.

== Personal life ==
Gill married Antoinette Bower whom he met in Los Angeles in 1962.

== Exhibitions (selection) ==
- 1962/1964/1966 Alan Gallery, New York City
- 1963/1965/1967 Felix Landau Gallery, Los Angeles
- 1964 Galeria George Lester, Rome
- 1966 Crocker Gallery, Sacramento, California
- 1970 Civic Center, Topanga, California
- 2005 San Angelo Museum of Fine Arts, San Angelo, Texas
- 2012 “L.A. Raw“, Pasadena Art Museum, Pasadena, California
- 2013 art Karlsruhe
- 2014 ART Innsbruck
- 2015 Art Southampton, New York
- 2016 Busan Biennale, South Korea
- 2017 Museum of the Southwest, Midland, Texas

== Works in public collections ==
- Berkeley Art Museum, University of California, Berkeley
- Museum Moderner Kunst Stiftung Ludwig, Vienna
- Museum of Modern Art, New York
- National Museum of the U.S. Navy, Washington, D.C.
- National Portrait Gallery, Washington, D.C.
- Neue Galerie, Kassel
- San Angelo Museum of Fine Arts, San Angelo, Texas
- Santa Barbara Museum of Art, Santa Barbara, California
- Smithsonian American Art Museum, Washington, D.C.
- Stanford University Center for Visual Arts, Stanford, California
- Art Institute of Chicago, Chicago, Illinois
- Whitney Museum of American Art, New York

== Honors and awards ==
- Art fellowship, University of Texas, 1959
- Awarded Purchase Prize, Sixty-seventh Annual American Exhibition, The Art Institute of Chicago, 1964

== Bibliography ==
- Alfred H. Barr: Painting and Sculpture in the Museum of Modern Art. Museum of Modern Art, 1977.
- John I. H. Baur: Dictionary of Contemporary American Artists. 5. Auflage. Whitney Museum of American Art Catalogue of the Collection. Cummings, Paul (1987), 1974.
- Kimberly S. Bushby: The power of pop-icons in the age of celebrity. In: James Francis Gill: Catalogue Raisonné of Original Prints (Vol. 1). 2017.
- van Deren Coke: The Painter and the Photograph: From Delacroix to Warhol. University of New Mexico Press, Albuquerque 1964.
- Lonnie Pierson Dunbier (Ed.): The Artists Bluebook 34,000 North American Artists to March 2005. 2005.
- Michael Duncan: Gill. L.A. RAW. Pasadena Museum of California Art. 2005.
- Jim Edwards, William Emboden, David McCarthy: Uncommonplaces: The Art of James Francis Gill. 2005.
- Peter Hastings Falk (Ed.): Who Was Who in American Art. 1564–1975. 1999.
- Jaques Cattell Harris: Who's Who in American Art. 1976.
- Neil Harris, Martina R Norelli: Art, Design and the Modern Corporation. 1985.
- Eberhard and Phyllis Kronhausen: Erotic Art. Carroll & Graf Publishers. 1993.
- David McCarthy: Movements in Modern Art: Pop Art. 2000.
- David McCarthy: Sincerely Disturbed: James Gill and Vietnam. 2005.
- Premium Modern Art (Ed.): James Francis Gill – The Absence of Color. 2018.
- Henrey J. Seldis: James Gill. In: Los Angeles Times. November 8, 1965.
- Peter Selz: Art Across America. 1965.
- Smithsonian Institution: National Portrait Gallery Collection Illustrated Checklist. 1985.
- Tampa Bay Art Center: 40 Now California Painters. 1968.
- University of Oklahoma: East Coast-West Coast Paintings. 1968.
