= Eccrine sweat gland =

Sweat gland distributed almost all over the human body

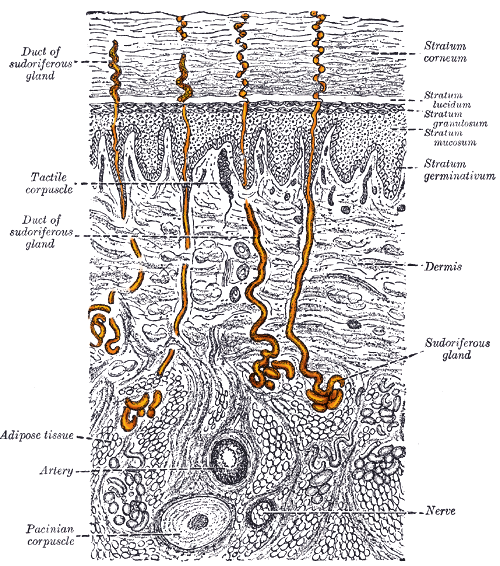
- A sectional view of the skin (magnified), with eccrine glands highlighted.

Details
- Precursor: Ectoderm
- System: Integumentary
- Nerve: Cholinergic sympathetic nerves

Identifiers
- Latin: glandula sudorifera merocrina; glandula sudorifera eccrina
- MeSH: D004439
- TH: H3.12.00.3.03009
- FMA: 59154

Eccrine sweat glands (/ˈɛkrən, -ˌkraɪn, -ˌkriːn/; from Greek ek(s)+krinein 'out(wards)/external+secrete') are the major sweat glands of the human body. Eccrine sweat glands are found in virtually all skin, with the highest density in the palms of the hands, and soles of the feet, and on the head, but much less on the torso and the extremities. In other mammals, they are relatively sparse, being found mainly on hairless areas such as foot pads. They reach their peak of development in humans, where they may number 200–400/cm^{2} of skin surface. They produce sweat, a merocrine secretion which is clear, odorless substance, consisting primarily of water. These are present from birth. Their secretory part is present deep inside the dermis.

Eccrine glands are composed of an intraepidermal spiral duct, the "acrosyringium"; a dermal duct, consisting of a straight and coiled portion; and a secretory tubule, coiled deep in the dermis or hypodermis. The eccrine gland opens out through the sweat pore. The coiled portion is formed by two concentric layers of columnar or cuboidal epithelial cells. The epithelial cells are interposed by the myoepithelial cells. Myoepithelial cells support the secretory epithelial cells. The duct of eccrine gland is formed by two layers of cuboidal epithelial cells.

Eccrine glands are active in thermoregulation by providing cooling from water evaporation of sweat secreted by the glands on the body surface and emotionally induced sweating (anxiety, fear, stress, and pain). The white sediment in otherwise colorless eccrine secretions is caused by evaporation that increases the concentration of salts.

The odor from sweat is due to bacterial activity on the secretions of the apocrine sweat glands, a distinctly different type of sweat gland found in human skin.

Eccrine glands are innervated only by the sympathetic nervous system. Postganglionic sympathetic fibers innervating the cutaneous district can produce either noradrenaline or acetylcholine as neurotransmitters depending on the target structure. The sympathetic cholinergic fibers connecting with the sweat glands discharge primarily by changes in deep body temperature (core temperature). The glands on palms and soles do not respond only to temperature stimuli but secrete at times of emotional stress.

== Secretion ==
The secretion of eccrine glands is a sterile, dilute electrolyte solution with primary components of bicarbonate, potassium, and sodium chloride (NaCl), and other minor components that may include glucose, pyruvate, lactate, cytokines, immunoglobulins, antimicrobial peptides such as dermcidin, and many others.

Relative to the plasma and extracellular fluid, the concentration of Na^{+} ions is much lower in sweat (~40 mmol/L in sweat versus ~140 mmol/L in plasma and extracellular fluid). Initially, within the eccrine glands, sweat has a high concentration of Na^{+} ions. The Na^{+} ions are re-absorbed into the tissue via the epithelial sodium channels (ENaCs) that are located on the apical membrane of the cells that form the eccrine gland ducts (see Fig. 9 and Fig. 10 of the reference). This re-uptake of Na^{+} ions reduces the loss of Na^{+} during the process of perspiration. People with the systemic pseudohypoaldosteronism syndrome who carry mutations in the ENaC subunit genes have salty sweat as they cannot reabsorb the salt in sweat. Sometimes these Na^{+} ion concentrations can greatly increase (up to 180 mmol/L).

In people who have hyperhidrosis, the sweat glands (eccrine glands in particular) overreact to stimuli and are just generally overactive, producing more sweat than normal. Similarly, people with cystic fibrosis also produce salty sweat. But in these cases, the problem is in the CFTR chloride transporter that is also located on the apical membrane of eccrine gland ducts.

Alice Potts's art largely utilizes isolated eccrine sweat to form crystals.

== See also ==
List of distinct cell types in the adult human body
