= Alan Brough (studio potter) =

British studio potter (1924–2012)

Alan Brough (20 April 1924 – 2012) was a studio potter, the son of sculptor Alan Brough.

Brough was born in 1924 in Wilmslow, Cheshire, he studied at the Camberwell School of Art in London from 1946 to 1950. In 1953 his three legged bowl won first prize at the International Handicraft Exhibition in Earls Court.

In 1956 along with art school friend Tony Deacon he started Deacon Pottery in Central London. In 1968 he was invited by Bill Marshall to join Bernard Leach at the Leach Pottery in St Ives Cornwall. He featured along with Shoji Hamada in a 1971 film The Art of the Potter by American filmmakers David Outerbridge and Sidney Reichman.

He established his own pottery in Newlyn, Cornwall in 1972, working mainly in porcelain and stoneware. His wife Sheila was a textile artist, designer and dressmaker and his son Adrian is also a potter in Lelant Cornwall.

His work is held by Leicester Museum, and Penlee House. A selection of his pots featured in an exhibition The Royal Academy at Wolfson and are held in a collection at Cambridge University.
