= Jeffrey Isaac =

American painter

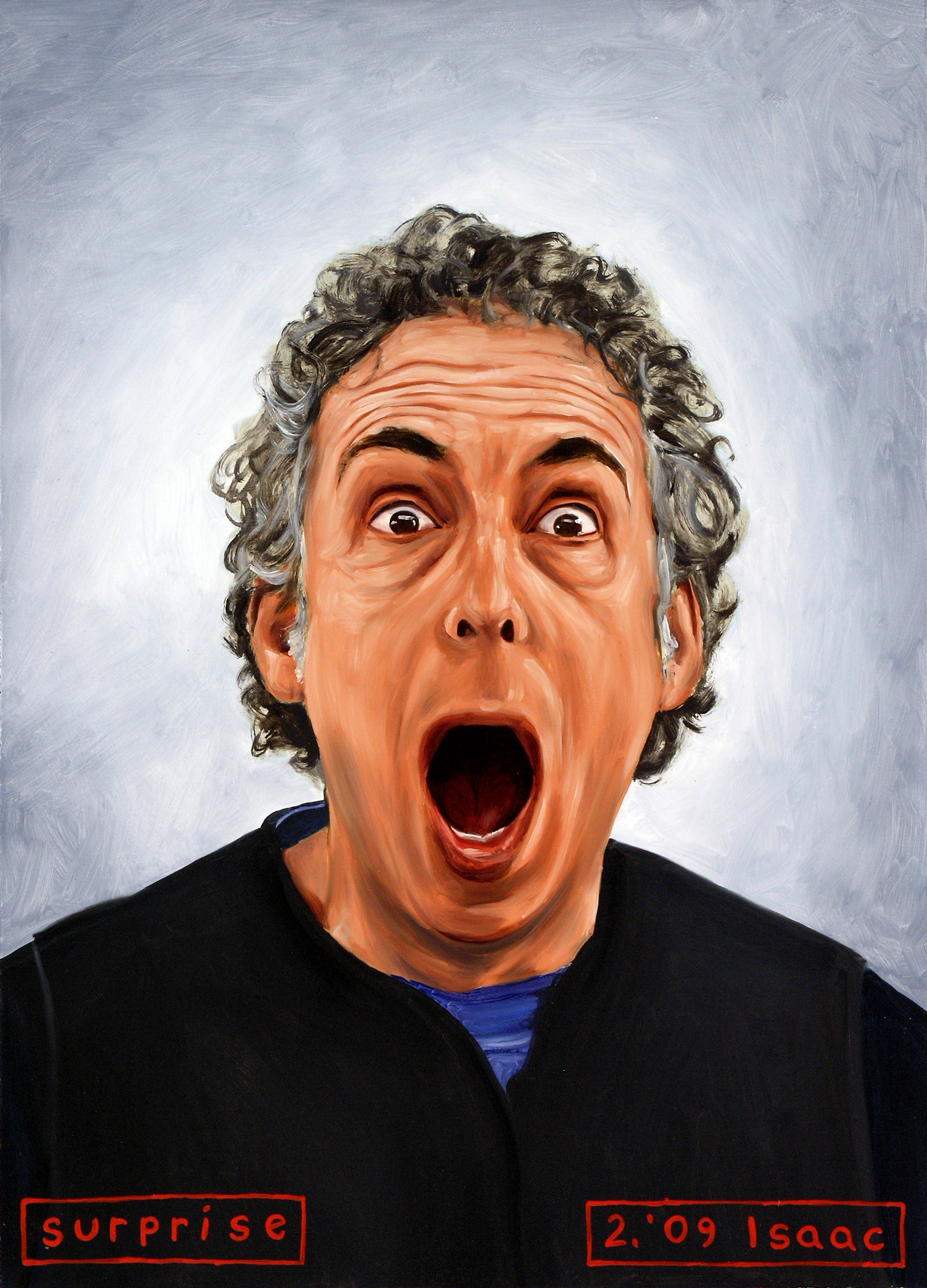
- from Emotional Self-Portraits - Surprise, 2009
- Born: October 25, 1956

Jeffrey Isaac (born 1956 in New York) is a painter and video artist. His style often uses photorealism as a means to a conceptual inquiry of fantastical content with an absurdist approach.

He also uses several pseudonyms including Prof. Dr. Dr. Zagreus Bowery, publisher of the so-called "world's smallest magazine of its kind" Public Illumination Magazine.

== Art ==
Isaac has exhibited widely across the US and Europe. His work incorporates a range of media, from digital art to oil on canvas; he is particularly known for his installations, often incorporating sound and performance as well as panoramas and dioramic cabinets.

In 2016 he created a major installation, titled 'Earthly Delights' of large-scale cut-out paintings, suspended in a re-purposed church, with a concurrent performance by Nyla van Ingen, Myriam Laplante, Daniela Malusardi and Dan Kinzelman.

His exhibition 'Manifest Destinies' (2009) at Cà Zanardi, Venice, was part of an ambitious series of multi-site collateral shows of the 53rd Venice Biennale "Detournement Venise 2009", in a 2-story former cookie factory. It included monumental history paintings such as "Flotilla of Fools" depicting all 196 heads of state, wearing fool's hats, posing on shipwrecks.

He created the animation for the 2007 performance of ‘Il Corvo’ by the La Mama Experimental Theater Company at the 38th Biennale Teatro in Venice.

In 1993 he had a solo exhibition at Galleria Marilena Bonomo in Bari, titled '93 Olives' and in 1994 a solo show at Salvatore Ala Gallery in Soho, NYC titled ‘Subway to Italy’.

At the 1990 Spoleto Festival in Italy, he presented a 350° walk-in panorama of the Umbrian village Bazzano Superiore (later shown in Rome and Bari and currently held in the LeWitt Collection, Chester, CT, USA). It was installed in the geodesic dome in Spoleto known as the Spoletosfera, designed by Buckminster Fuller.

With public funding from NYSCA, Isaac curated a series of exhibitions in a storefront gallery in Lower Manhattan named Public Illumination Picture Gallery. The two-year program (1982–1983) included work by David Wojnarowicz, Mimi Gross, Christian Marclay, Barbara Ess and Rudy Burckhardt amongst others. For the final exhibition he created an interactive multi-media installation titled 'Exhibition in a maze'.

== Publishing ==
In 1984 his book "Twelve Picturesque Passions" was sponsored by Printed Matter, Inc, partially funded by a LINE grant. It was at this time that he met the American artist Sol LeWitt, one of the co-founders of Printed Matter, who later became a friend and neighbor. In 2017 an exhibition about Isaac's relationship with LeWitt was staged at the Chelsea College of Arts Library titled "Exchanges between Sol LeWitt and Jeffrey Isaac in Spoleto, Italy, and New York and Chester, Connecticut USA". It was curated by Jo Melvin, Reader in Fine Art, Archives and Special Collections at Chelsea College of Art.

Since 1979 Isaac has published an artists' periodical, notable for its tiny size, called Public Illumination Magazine. Each issue has a unique theme with contributions by numerous artists using pseudonyms. Through 2017, sixty issues have been published. It is included in the collections of the New York Public Library, Museum of Modern Art, New York, Pompidou Center, Paris, and others.

== Life ==
Born in the US, he spent his childhood in Switzerland before moving back to the United States where he studied painting at Rhode Island School of Design (B.F.A 1977) and at Camberwell School of Art in London (under the recommendation of Frank Bowling). In 1977 he moved to NYC where his activities expanded to publishing, performance art and curating. In 1979 he developed the format for and co-managed the performance series Avant-Garde-Arama at the venue Performance Space 122. Under the alias Eddie Grand he performed in the art-rock band “Listen to the Animal” with Barbara Ess, Judith Wong and Al Arthur, at venues such as CBGB, the Mudd Club and The Public Theater.

In 1986 he moved to Umbria near the town of Spoleto, befriending artists Sol LeWitt, Carol and Michael Venezia, Afranio Metelli, Robin Heidi Kennedy, Marco Tirelli, Myriam Laplante, Franco Troiani, Emanuele de Donno and Nyla van Ingen.

During the period from 1999 to 2006, he produced a series of video animations featuring skeletons, saints and devils.

In 2004, a minor scandal surrounded a banner he had painted at the invitation of the town of Foligno for a historical pageant depicting the patron saint San Feliciano naked on horseback.

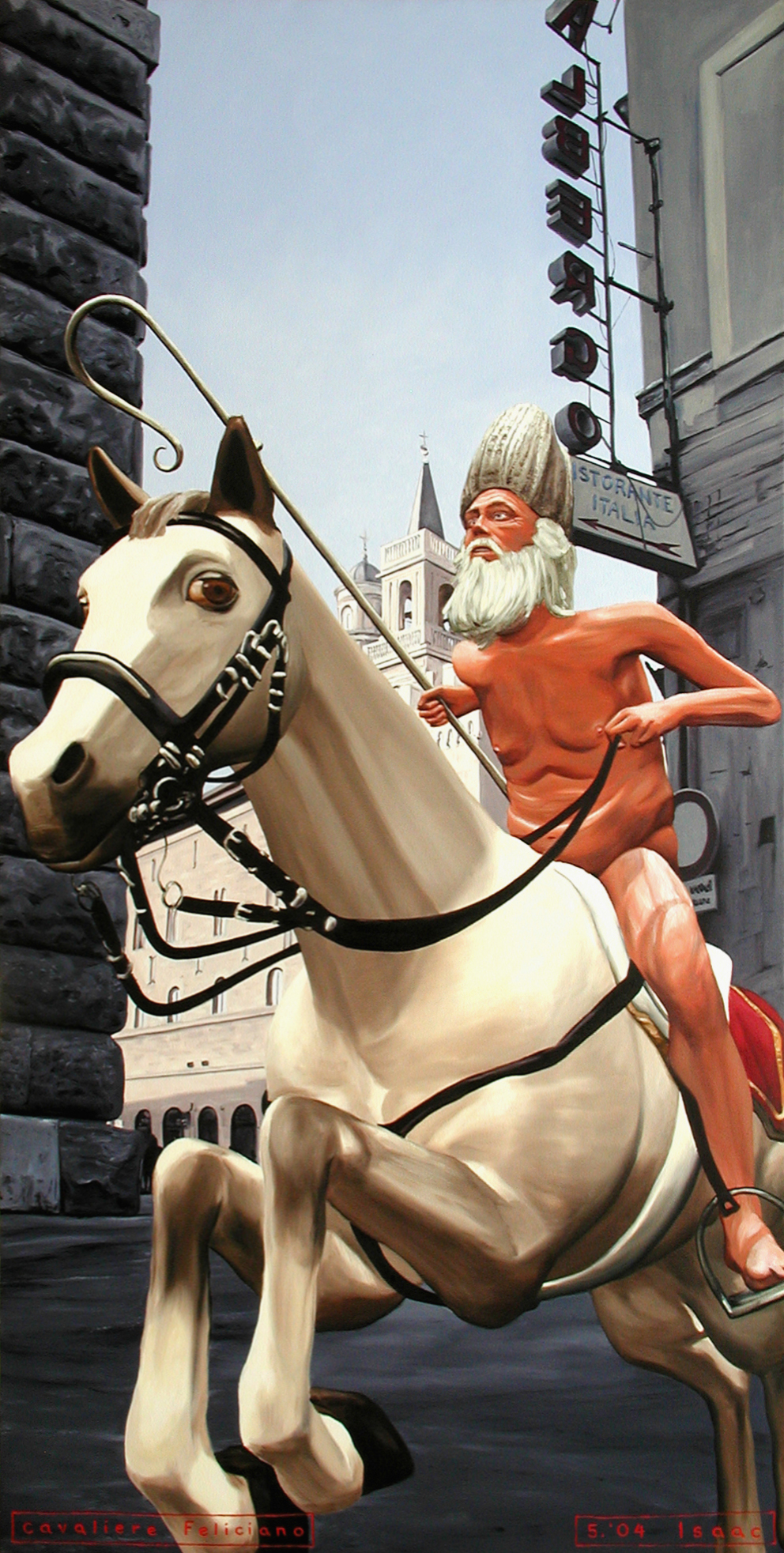
Jeffrey Isaac, Cavaliere Feliciano

== Selected exhibitions ==
- 102 Hands, Museo della Chirurgia, Preci, Italy; Museo Archeologico, Spoleto, Italy, 2016, 2017
- Earthly Delights, Performing Santa Caterina, Foligno, Italy, 2016
- Spoleto Contemporanea, Museo Carandente, Spoleto, Italy, 2015
- Ovest, Palazzo Leonetti-Luparini, Spoleto, Italy, 2015
- CLOSE UP, Museo Carandente, Spoleto, Italy, 2015
- Baculus, Museo Carandente etc., Spoleto, Italy, 2014
- Ricognizione 2014 – Arte Contemporanea in Umbria, CIAC, Foligno, Italy, 2014
- IL TEATRINO DELLE BELLE FIGURE, Biblioteca comunale – Rocca Albornoziana, Spoleto, Italy, 2011–12
- +50, Museo Carandente, Spoleto, Italy, 2012
- Porträt, Kunstraum T27, Berlin, Germany, 2010
- Walking the Dog, Kunsthalle Dominikanerkirche, Osnabrueck, Germany, 2010
- Mediamorfosi 2.0, Sublab, Portici, Italy, 2010
- OSTRALE´010, Zentrum für zeitgenössische Kunst, Dresden, Germany, 2010
- Natur – Mensch 2010, Nationalpark Harz, Sankt Andreasberg, Germany, 2010
- Horizonte, Altes Museum Neukölln, Berlin, Germany, 2010
- Nord Art 2010, Kunst in der Carlshütte, Büddelsdorf, Germany, 2010
- LUST, 1. Bazonnale, Weimar, Germany, 2010
- Druckfigur, Galerie Südliches Friesland, Zetel, Germany, 2009
- MANIFEST DESTINIES, 53. Biennale d´Arte, Venice, Italy, 2009
- MAnATURE, 48 Stunden Neukölln, Berlin, Germany 2009
- ...Where Angels Fear to Tread, Galleria Civica d'Arte Moderna, Spoleto, Italy, 2009
- I diavoli di Jeffrey Isaac, Villa Fabri o Boemi, Trevi, Italy, 2008
- Dogs, Devils & Disasters, Kunstverein Schwetzingen, Germany, 2007
- Videosanti, c.a.l.m.a., Perugia, Italy, 2007
- Profane & Sacred, Auditorium della Stella, Spoleto, Italy, 2006
- 10 Dog’s Tales, Festival dei Presidi, Orbetello, Italy, 1999
- Umbrian Walk, Castello di Poreta, Spoleto, Italy, 1998
- Magic Show, Galerie Commercio, Zürich, Switzerland, 1998
- Passage of Birds, Monti Associazione Culturale, Rome, Italy, 1997
- Subway to Caserta, Mediarte, Caserta, Italy, 1996
- Animal Portraits, Planita, Rome; Palazzo Comunale, Spoleto, Italy,1995
- Per mari e monti, Macerata, Italy, 1995
- Bestiario" Studio Cristofori, Bologna, Italy, 1994
- Kleine Retrospektive, Galerie Commercio, Zürich, Switzerland, 1994
- Subway to Italy, Salvatore Ala, NYC, USA, 1994
- Panorama di Bazzano Superiore, Planita, Rome, Italy, 1994
- Dina Carola, Naples, Italy 1993
- 93 Olives, Galleria Marilena Bonomo, Bari, Italy, 1993
- Madonna del Pozzo, Galleria Marilena Bonomo, Bari, Italy, 1991
- Galerie Feusisberg, Feusisberg, Switzerland, 1990
- Panorama di Bazzano Superiore, Spoletosfera, Festival of Two Worlds, Spoleto, Italy, 1990
- Neue Galerie a16, Zürich, Switzerland, 1990
- Galerie Nada Relic, Zürich, Switzerland, 1990
- Palazzo Rosari Spada, Spoleto, Italy, 1989
- Galerie Nada Relic, Zürich, Switzerland, 1988
- Galerie Murbach, Horgen, Switzerland, 1987
- Edison Hall Gallery, Edison, NJ, USA, 1985
- Phenix City Art Gallery, NYC, USA, 1985
- Centre d'Art Contemporain, Geneva, Switzerland, 1984
- ZONA, Florence, Italy, 1982
- Galerie 38, Zürich, Switzerland, 1979, 1977, 1976

== Books ==
- 640 drawings done at the speed of a Xerox 4500 photocopier, 1978, Jeffrey Isaac
- Twelve Picturesque Passions, Public Illumination Editions, 1984, Jeffrey Isaac
- 91 Animal Portraits, Public Illumination Editions, Planita-Roma, 1996, Jeffrey Isaac
- 477 Paintings, 2005, Jeffrey Isaac
