= Roy Turner Durrant =

English painter

- Artist at work March 1954
- Born: 4 October 1925; Lavenham, Suffolk, England
- Died: July 3, 1998 (aged 72); Cambridge, England
- Occupation: Artist
- Style: Abstract Art
- Website: https://royturnerdurrant.com

Roy Turner Durrant (4 October 1925 – 4 July 1998) was a 20th-century English abstract artist. He was born in Lavenham, Suffolk, England on 4 October 1925. He had a love of drawing from an early age which continued as a driving force throughout his life. His lifelong motto (which he inscribed on the fly leaf of many a volume of his childhood library) was "ars longa, vita brevis" ("art is never ending, life is short") which he may have first seen in the bell tower of Lavenham Church, and following his wish was also carved on his tombstone in Lavenham cemetery.

He had a picture exhibited at Bury St Edmunds while still at school and his drawings were currency for him at school when he swapped them with classmates for cigarette cards and other items. He had his first One Man Exhibition in 1948 at the Guildhall, Lavenham.

He left school at 14 years of age but continued to spend his spare time drawing and painting. During this time, he worked in a local electrical shop. During the Second World War, Durrant joined the Suffolk Regiment from 1944 to 1947. After the war, he secured a place at the Camberwell College of Arts, where he was taught by Edward Ardizzone, Michael Rothenstein, Keith Vaughan, and John Buckland Wright, and was a contemporary of Theodore Mendez. Whilst at Camberwell he was already exhibiting his paintings in London galleries. He was represented at the Archer Gallery, Kensington in August 1952. In the same month, at an open-air art exhibition at Battersea Pleasure Gardens. His work moved from early landscape and architectural interest to abstraction but with a great variety of style and technique.

In 1963, Durrant moved to Cambridge to take up the post of Art Gallery Manager at Heffers at the time a well known local artists' materials and book sellers. He continued his vocation of painting in his days off, spending his evenings reading (mainly 19th- and 20th-century literature, theological works and poetry) or listening to the radio (especially classical music, radio plays and religious programmes on Radio 3 or 4).

Durrant published a book of poetry A Rag Book of Love in 1960 A self-portrait of the artist is included in the Tate Gallery Archive Collection TGA 8214.26 (1953 poster paint on paper, exhibited at Artists' International Association Gallery in 1950s)

He exhibited frequently throughout his life, holding numerous one man exhibitions not only in London but also nationally. He frequently had works included in the annual Royal Academy London Summer Exhibitions. Durrant died in his home of Cambridge on 3 July 1998.

== Legacy ==
Durrant's works have been collected by public galleries, universities and colleges worldwide and interest in his work both in Britain and overseas has continued since his death in 1998. There have been several retrospective exhibitions of Durrant's work since his death, including a one-man show at the Fine Art Society in New Bond Street London in May 2008. Roy Turner Durrant (1925–1998), a book about Durrant, was published in September 2011.

The first in a series of major survey catalogues looking at the artists oeuvre and featuring works from the artists' estate was published by Mark Barrow Fine Art in January 2015 and is available at http://www.modernbritishartists.co.uk/catalogues/Durrant1950-55/.
