= Gloria Ojulari Sule =

British artist and educator (1950–2024)

- Born: Gloria Folerin Yeside Ojulari; 6 November 1950; London, England, UK
- Died: June 2024 (aged 73); Colombia
- Education: Norwich School of Art and Design, BA, 1996
- Occupations: Artist; educator
- Children: 1
- Website: gloria-ojulari-sule.weebly.com

Gloria Folerin Yeside Ojulari Sule (née Ojulari; 6 November 1950 – June 2024) was a British artist and educator based in Bristol. Sule's work explored cultural identity, in particular the identities of mixed race people in the United Kingdom.

== Early life and education ==
Sule was born Gloria Folerin Yeside Ojulari on 6 November 1950 in London to a British mother and a Yoruba Nigerian father. The racism faced by her parents as a mixed race couple evidently led to their separation, after which Sule and her brother where placed in a children’s home in Suffolk.

In 1996, Sule graduated for the from the Norwich School of Art and Design with a BA in Fine Art Painting. Sule also held a City and Guilds Certificate in Further Adult Education Teaching.

== Career ==
Following graduation, Sule moved to Bristol. To promote art in her local community, Sule has participated in community arts, adult education and early years education. As part of the renewal scheme of St Paul's, Bristol, she painted a well-known mural, covering seven metres on the side of a building in St Paul's. She has also painted shop signs for the Renewal Scheme, murals in Brighton Street and fascia in St Agnes, Bristol. In 2002 she worked as artist researcher advising the planning and development of St Paul's Learning and Family Centre, a community centre in St Pauls, Bristol.

A textile artwork What's our Story (2010) was commissioned by Brent Museum in response to the British Museum's touring exhibition Fabric of a Nation. An interactive costume designed for two children to wear at the same time, it was inspired by Egungun masquerade costumes worn at Yoruba festivals, Ghanaian kente and adinkra cloth, and contemporary African artwork.

In 2018, Ojulari Sule relocated to Buenaventura, Colombia to live with her daughter. Sule later settled in Cali.

In June 2024, Sule died in Colombia aged 73.
