= Dimitri Launder =

UK-based artist and garden designer

Dimitri Launder is a UK-based artist and garden designer. After graduating from Camberwell College of Arts he developed a unique participatory photographic practice that involved the design, creation and construction of pinhole cameras. He has worked in a variety of pedagogic contexts. He is an alumnus of Camberwell College of Arts and Central Saint Martins College of Art and Design. Launder is engaged in the dialogue about Artist Led Culture Launder was co-founder of artist led space AREA 10 in Peckham, London.

Launder is now known for his socially engaged practice as Artist Gardener and his role as co-director of Arbonauts. Dimitri Launder’s practice as Artist Gardener offers a gentle provocation to an apocalyptic view of urban ecological sustainability. His work often explores the liminal issues between public and private use of space, aspiring towards transformative urban propagation such as his work Apothecary Arboretum in the Arte Útil Archive . “Dimitri Launder is an ‘Artist Gardener’ who knows the political power of plants and isn’t afraid to use it” The Times 2011. He was research artist with Arts Catalyst initiating his Remedy for a City project.

Amongst others Launder's work has been commissioned by CCA Gallery Glasgow, South London Gallery, Geoffreys Museum, Tate Britain & Tate Modern, Glasgow Lighthouse and Southwark Council.
