= Theodore Mendez =

English painter (1934–1997)

Theo Mendez
- Theodore Mendez
- Born: 3 April 1934; Finsbury, London, England
- Died: 27 February 1997 (aged 62); London, England
- Known for: Painting
- Movement: abstract art

Theodore R P Mendez (1934–1997) was an English abstract artist who taught at Camberwell College of Arts in London for over thirty years. After attending Strand School, he entered Camberwell College of Arts in 1950 as a student, where his contemporaries included Terry Frost, Howard Hodgkin, Euan Uglow, Roy Turner Durrant, Bernard Dunstan and Gillian Ayres. He returned as a teacher; and from 1976 to 1984 was head of the Textile Department.

Writing about his work in 1990, he confided, " My recent work is no way representational or literal...The works are sometimes symbolic of a moment in time – an event or place witnessed, felt or experienced.. The work I do is made up – invented – stimulated by life-enhancing experience... Each work has ultimately to stand by itself without necessarily being part of a series or having a title or clue as to its origin... I love the variety of the medium, the spreading of colour and the interrelation of colour and colour areas... sometimes the work comes almost directly via music, which I listen to constantly – several hours every day – like food and drink, it is essential... if I achieve anything at all, it has, for me, to satisfy [a need for] lasting contemplation – mystical, intangible.."

His first exhibition was at the Redfern Gallery in London in 1954; he would later show his textile designs at the Victoria & Albert Museum in 1956 and in the same year won the Design Award at the Manchester Colour, Design & Style Centre. Mendez returned to the Camberwell College of Arts in 1958, which was the year when Frank Auerbach began his time on the staff. Mendez continued to teach full-time, and was Head of the Textile Department from 1976 until his retirement in 1984, which was precipitated by his feeling that the re-organization of London art colleges at that moment would erode the intimate values upon which he believed artistic creation was predicated.

He exhibited less in his later years, preferring to concentrate on teaching, and in retirement, intensive painting. His creative output did not diminish, and his paintings were hung alongside such acknowledged modernists as David Hockney, Patrick Caulfield, Patrick Heron & Roger Hilton, especially at two exhibitions at the Walker Art Gallery in Liverpool in 1972 & 1978.

Since his death there have been six London exhibitions, and his works are in The Museum of London and private collections in France, Australia, New Zealand, America and Great Britain. His work is mainly abstract and often based on urban landscapes, cosmopolitan emblems such as Parisian cafes or Argentinian tangos, and is suffused with a sense of music, especially jazz. There are countless highly literate references to the history of art, and in this sense he was arguably one of the earliest post-moderninsts, perhaps without fully being aware of it. He worked with oil, acrylic and collage on canvas, wood and cardboard. He also made constructions in wood and metal, and even painted a few touching, almost expressionistic landscape canvases on rare occasions of lyrical outburst.
