= Alan Brough (sculptor) =

British sculptor 1890–1986

Alan Brough (17 January 1890 – 1986) was a sculptor, born at Morley, near Wilmslow, Cheshire, active from 1926 until 1951. Brough studied at Manchester School of Art. A coal sculpture by Brough called Pit Brow Lassie made in 1926 is on display in the Science Museum, London. His sculpture Primavera, from 1927 is on display in Manchester City Art Gallery. Brough lived in Prestbury and worked from his studio in Wilmslow he was also known for his busts of George V and George VI.

In April 1934 he carved a figure called Black Hercules from a 1.25 ton piece of coal from a mine belonging to Manchester Collieries.

Brough was a member of the Manchester Academy of Fine Arts.

A composition bird-bath sculpted in 1924 sold at a Bonhams auction for £1,147.50 in 2019. He died in 1986 at his daughter’s house in Marchamley.

His son also called Alan Brough was a studio potter.
