= Norwich University of the Arts =

Public university in Norwich, England

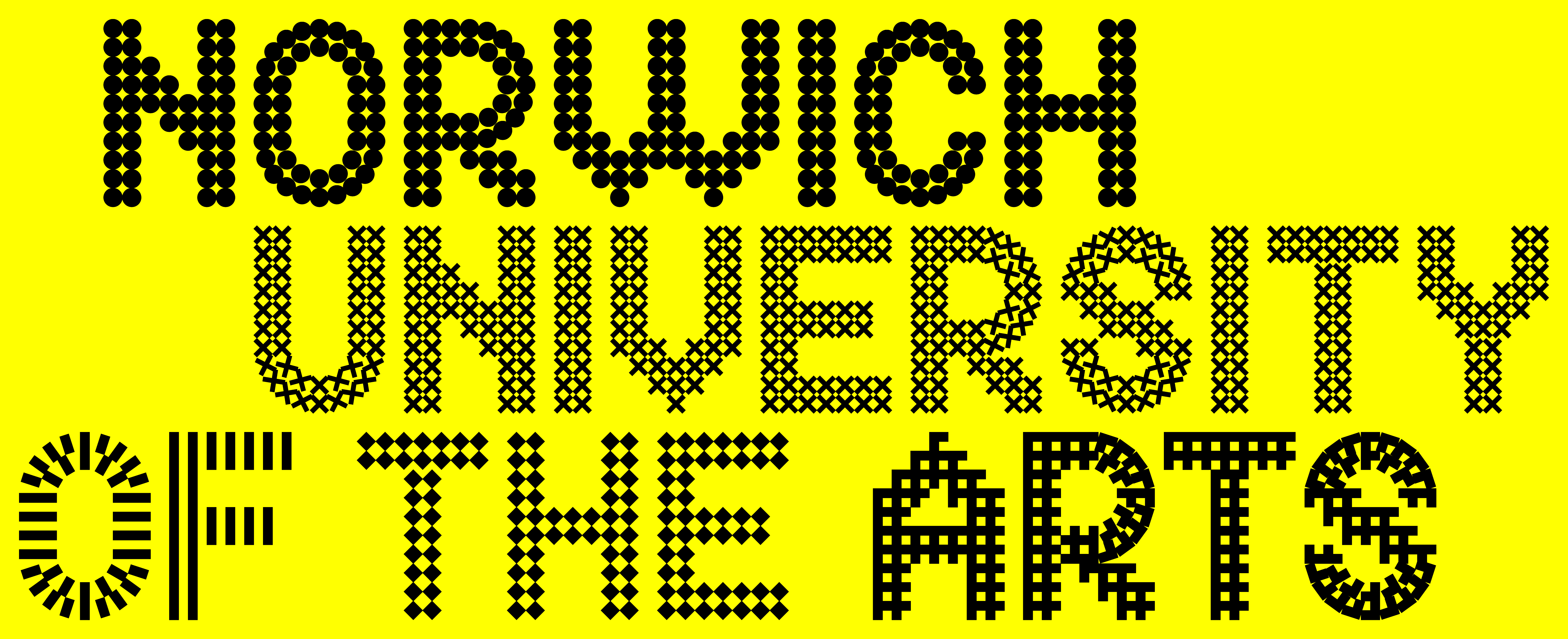
- Former names: Norwich School of Design; Norfolk Institute of Art and Design; Norwich School of Art and Design; Norwich University College of the Arts
- Type: Public
- Established: 1845 (Norwich School of Design); 2013 University status
- Chancellor: Amma Asante
- Vice-Chancellor: Ben Stopher
- Students: 2,765 (2024/25)
- Undergraduates: 2,645 (2024/25)
- Postgraduates: 120 (2024/25)
- Location: Norwich, Norfolk, England, UK; 52.6303°N 1.2966°E
- Campus: Urban
- Nickname: Norwich Arts
- Website: norwichuni.ac.uk

The Norwich University of the Arts (NUA) is a public university in Norwich, Norfolk, United Kingdom that specialises in art, design, media, architecture and performance. It was founded as Norwich School of Design in 1845 and has a long history of arts education. It gained full university status in 2013. The NUA is the smaller of two universities in Norwich, the other being the University of East Anglia (UEA).

== History ==
The history of the University dates back to 1845 when the Norwich School of Design was established to provide designers for local industries. Its founders were the artists and followers of the 'Norwich School of Painters', the only provincial British group to establish an international reputation for landscape painting.

Degree-level provision has been offered since 1965, when it was approved to offer the Diploma in Art and Design, validated by the National Council for Diplomas in Art and Design (NCDAD). After 1965 the School of Art made its own mark on the national art and design scene when twin strengths in Painting and Graphic Design emerged under a group of exceptional practitioners and teachers. From 1975, after NCDAD's merger with the Council for National Academic Awards (CNAA), the School offered its first BA Honours degree courses in Fine Art and Graphic Design, validated by CNAA.

In 1989 the School merged with Great Yarmouth College of Art to form the Norfolk Institute of Art and Design (NIAD). In 1991 Norfolk Institute of Art and Design become an Associate College of the new Anglia Polytechnic with the polytechnic assuming validation responsibilities from CNAA from September 1992. This agreement extended to postgraduate provision, with the first MA course being introduced in 1993 (MA Fine Art) and the first research degree student being registered in 1995.

In 1994, NIAD was incorporated as a Higher Education Institution (HEI), renamed as Norwich School of Art and Design and re-launched with a new corporate identity.

In November 2007, the School was granted the power to award its own degrees up to Master's level and was renamed Norwich University College of the Arts.

In 2012, a reduction in the threshold of number of students required for a university (from 4000 to 1000) made the college eligible for university status. Its university status was recognized in 2013, and its name changed to Norwich University of the Arts; the first chancellor was John Hurt.

== Buildings ==
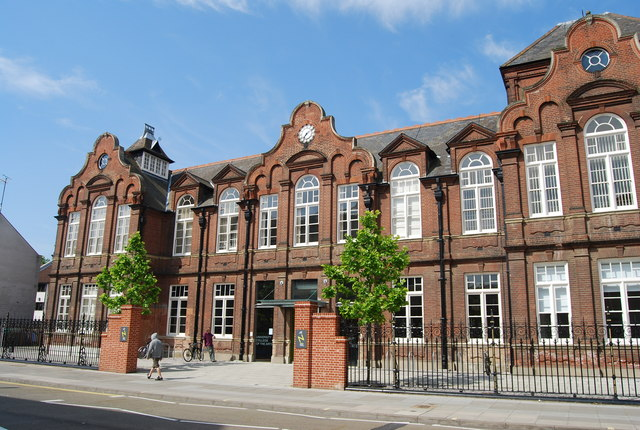
Duke Street building which houses the library and students' union.

The University campus comprises twelve buildings located in Norwich city centre. Francis House which is located on Redwell Street is the main reception for Norwich University of the Arts, while the majority of academic facilities are a two-minute walk away, along the pedestrianised St Georges Street, with additional sites on the neighbouring Duke Street and St Andrews Street.

Teaching facilities include a large Apple Mac and Windows suite, A1 style printing rooms, wood and metal workshops with a functioning forge, stop-motion animation studios, professional sound booths, open-plan design and illustration studios, constructed textiles and fashion workshops, lecture theatre and comprehensive library.

There are five areas of accommodation for year one students: All Saint's Green, Beechcroft, Crown Place, Duke Street Riverside, and Rochester Court.

== Organisation and structure ==
The Vice-Chancellor is Professor Ben Stopher and the Chancellor is the British filmmaker Amma Asante.

== Academic profile ==
Rankings
National rankings
- Complete (2027): 57
- Guardian (2027): 42
- Times / Sunday Times (2027): 74

Undergraduate courses are offered in a range of art and design fields, including Animation, Architecture, Design for Publishing, Fashion, Fashion Communication and Promotion, Film and Moving Image Publishing, Fine Art, Games Art and Design, Games Development, Graphic Communication, Graphic Design, Illustration, Photography, Textile Design and VFX.

Postgraduate courses include MAs in Communication Design, Curation, Fashion, Fine Art, Games, Moving Image and Sound, Photography, and Textile Design.

MPhil and PhD research degrees are also offered in many arts, design, and media areas.

== Research ==
Norwich University of the Arts entered the national Research Excellence Framework in 2014 with funding awarded to develop capability. In the 2014 REF submission, 55% of Norwich University of the Arts submitted research was confirmed to be "world leading" or "internationally excellent".

Norwich University of the Arts research has been judged to be particularly successful in terms of its impact on the broader cultural and economic landscape: 40% of Norwich University of the Arts research has been classified as "world leading" and 50% as "internationally excellent".

Norwich University of the Arts is a founding member of CREST, the Consortium for Research Excellence Support and Training, a group of higher education institutes that does interdisciplinary work related to research excellence and research focused staff and student training.

== Students' Union ==
The students' union represents all students and focuses on student experience, support, and activities. The union also has student offers and discount bus passes. It is affiliated with the National Union of Students (United Kingdom).

== Notable people ==
Alumni include:

- Michael Andrews, artist
- Marjorie May Bacon, painter and printmaker
- Brian Bolland, comic artist on Batman: The Killing Joke
- Glenn Brown, Turner Prize nominee
- Keith Chapman, television writer and producer, creator of Bob the Builder
- Elsie Vera Cole, painter
- Stuart Craig, production designer
- Leslie Davenport, artist and teacher
- Oona Grimes, artist
- Susan Gunn, painter and Sovereign European Art Prize winner
- Neil Innes, musician, writer for Monty Python and member of The Bonzo Dog Doo-Dah Band
- Leafcutter John, jazz musician for Mercury Prize nominees Polar Bear
- Paul Johnson, paper engineer and book artist
- Zebedee Jones, painter with works in the Tate Collection
- Robert Kennedy, publisher, painter, author and founder of MuscleMag International
- Bernard Meadows, modernist sculptor
- Alfred Munnings, artist and president of the Royal Academy
- Catherine Maude Nichols, painter
- Alice Potts, biotech researcher, artist, and fashion designer
- Colin Self, pop artist
- George Skipper, (attended for one year) architect
- Tim Stoner, winner of Beck's Futures Prize
- Gloria Ojulari Sule (1950–2024), artist and educator
- Horace Tuck, landscape artist
- Charles Mayes Wigg, landscape artist
- Gemma Correll, cartoonist

== See also ==
- Armorial of UK universities
- List of art universities and colleges in Europe
- List of universities in the UK
- Visual arts education
