= Zebedee Jones =

British abstract painter

- Born: 1970 (age 55–56)
- Known for: Painting

Zebedee Jones (born 12 March 1970) is a British abstract painter.

== Life and work ==
Zebedee Jones was born in London. He attended Camberwell College of Arts, Norwich University of the Arts and Chelsea School of Art and Design graduating in 1993. The following year Jones's paintings appeared in Unbound: possibilities in painting at the Hayward Gallery. His work is in several public collections including Tate, National Galleries of Scotland and the Arts Council of Great Britain Collection.

Untitled, 1998, Oil on linen mounted on board, 12 x 24 inches

Jones's work consists of monochrome abstracts, which have been described as adjacent to Neo-conceptual art or belonging to the Process Art tradition. However, above Jones is called one of a generation of artists who spearheaded a move away from conceptual, installation and video art in favour of a ‘return to painting’. His canvases are stretched over deep frames. The paint appears scraped on in layers, usually horizontal. The dragged surface of the canvas rather than being smooth has varying degrees of surface incident.

Zebedee Jones lives and works in London.

== Collection ==
Jones' work is held in the following public collection:

- Tate Gallery, London

== Exhibitions ==
=== Solo exhibitions ===
- Slewe Gallery, Amsterdam, NL, 2013
- Agnew’s Gallery, London, UK, 2011
- Mummery + Schnelle, London, UK, 2008
- Slewe Gallery, Amsterdam, NL, 2007
- Danese, New York, NY, 2005
- Slewe Gallery, Amsterdam, NL, 2004
- New Arts Centre, Salisbury, UK, 2003
- Danese, New York, NY, 2002
- Slewe Gallery, Amsterdam, NL, 2001
- Danese, New York, NY, 1999
- Waddington Galleries, London (cat.), 1998
- Green on Red Gallery, Dublin, IR, 1998
- Patrick de Brock, Knokke, BE, 1997
- Waddington Galleries, London, UK, 1997
- Karsten Schubert, London, UK, 1995

=== Selected group exhibitions ===
- Group Exhibition, Slewe Gallery, Amsterdam, NL, 2007
- 10 Years Slewe, Slewe Gallery, Amsterdam, NL (cat.), 2004
- Galerie Lelong, Zurich, SW, 2003
- Group Show, Pippy Houldsworth, London, UK, 2002
- Visione Britannica III, Valentina Moncada, Rome, IT, 1999
- Passion, Gasworks, London, UK
- Elegant Austerity, Waddington Galleries, London, UK, 1998
- Foundations for Fame, The London Institute Gallery, London, UK, 1997
- Ace! Arts Council Collection new Purchases, touring exhibition to Hatton Gallery, Newcastle / Hayward Gallery, London / Ikon Gallery, Birmingham, UK
- Mostly Monochrome, Green on Red Gallery, Dublin, IR, 1996
- Real Art, Southampton City Art Gallery / Leeds City Art Gallery / Stedelijk Museum, Aalst, BE (cat.), 1996
