= Bernadette Ash =

British artist

Bernadette Ash (born 1934) is a British painter.

== Biography ==
Ash worked full-time as a professional radiographer until 1973 when she decided to become an artist and enrolled on a year-long foundation course at the Byam Shaw School of Art. Upon leaving the Byam Shaw, Ash then studied at the Camberwell School of Arts and Crafts until 1977. Ash lives within the boundaries of the Exmoor National Park and the British countryside is the main subject of her paintings. In 1982 she had a solo show at the Woodlands Art Gallery and has also exhibited works with the New English Art Club, the Royal West of England Academy and at the Royal Academy.
