= John Kiki =

English figurative painter (born 1943)

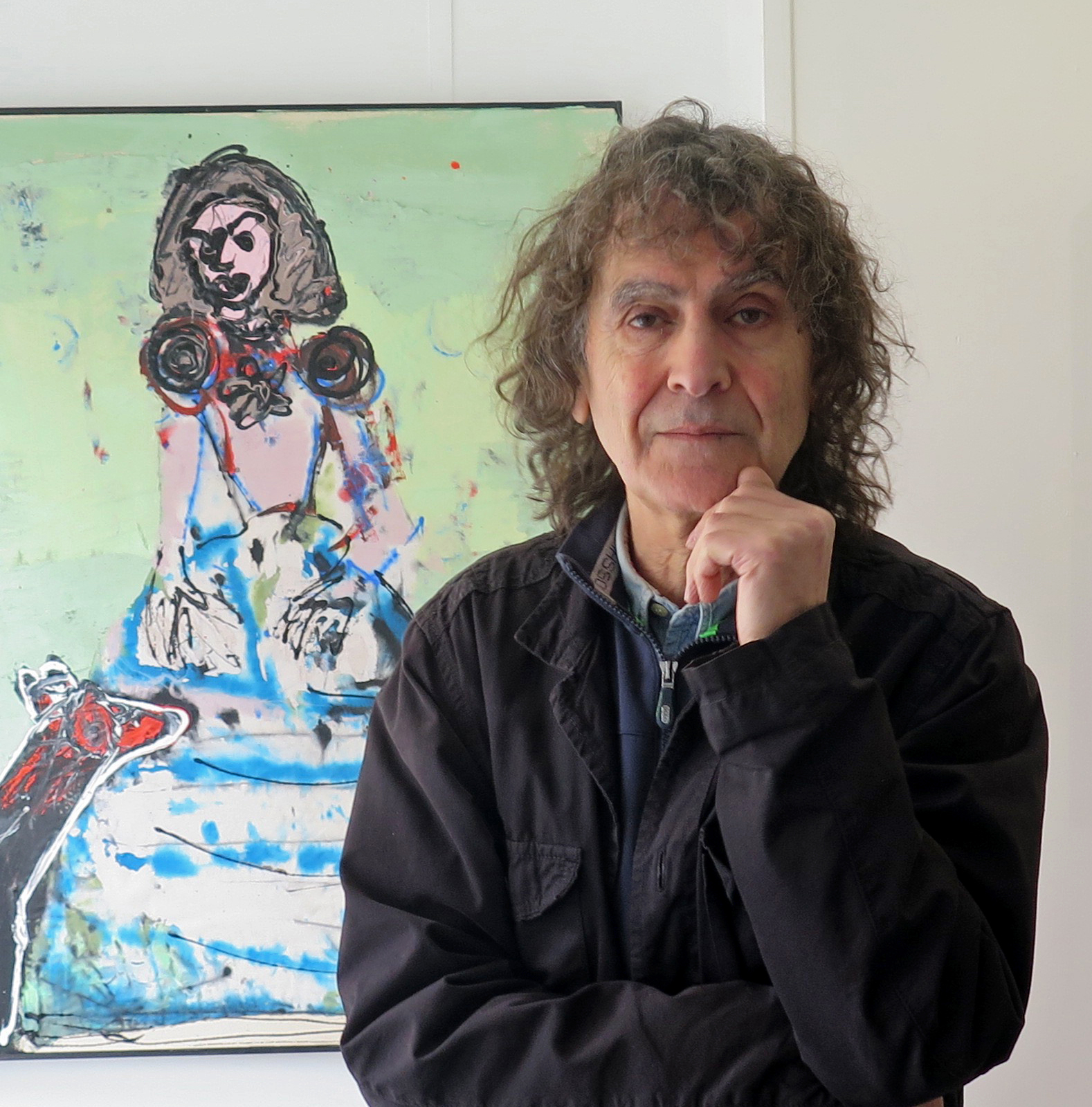
John Kiki with Infanta painting, 2016 (Photo: Keith Roberts)

John Kiki (born 9 May 1943) is an English figurative painter with deep roots in the Mediterranean.

== Early life ==
Kiki was born in the village of Eptakomi in Northern Cyprus, but moved to London with his family in 1943. He attended Camberwell College of Arts (1960–1964), training under Robert Medley and Frank Auerbach. After receiving his DipAD he went, at Auerbach's suggestion, to the Royal Academy Schools (1964–1967) for his Post-Graduate Certificate.

== Career ==
He then moved to Great Yarmouth and established his studio. He was married in 1970 to Mary Papalouca. After working in the restaurant business for several years (1973–1979) he then returned to full-time painting and exhibiting, and developed his distinctive style that is still evolving. He has exhibited widely, including in New York, Barbican, Hayward Gallery, Serpentine Gallery, Germany, Zagreb, Innsbruck and Zurich, as well as in many local Norfolk galleries.

His work has roots in his Greek Cypriot background and his subject matter reflects the twin poles of Greek Mythology and Seaside Mythology. He has painted many versions of the Infanta motif from Diego Velásquez's painting Las Meninas

Paintings are held in public collections, including: Saatchi Collection, London; Castle Museum and Art Gallery, Norwich; National Museum Wales, Cardiff; Chantrey Bequest, London.
