= Elsie Vera Cole =

English painter and art teacher (1885-1967)

- Born: 27 July 1885; Braintree, Essex, England
- Died: 2 January 1967 (aged 81); Diss, Norfolk, England
- Education: Norwich School of Art; Chelmsford School of Art
- Known for: Painting

Elsie Vera Cole (27 July 1885 – 2 January 1967) was an English painter, engraver and art teacher.

== Biography ==
Cole was born in Braintree in Essex to the congregational minister William Cole and his wife Ellen née Holmes. Cole went to school in Gravesend in Kent and studied at the Norwich School of Art from 1908 to 1910. She went on to study at the Chelmsford School of Art, completing her studies in 1919. Cole then returned to the Norwich School of Art to take a teaching position at and continued to teach there until 1941. Living in Norwich she produced A Sketch book of Norwich which was published in 1920. Cole travelled and painted widely in Britain and Europe. She exhibited with the Royal Institute of Painters in Water Colours, the Society of Women Artists, the Royal West of England Academy in Bristol and with the Norwich Art Circle. From 1933 she was also a regular exhibitor with the Ipswich Art Club. Cole died at Diss in Norfolk in 1967.
