= Horace Tuck =

English painter

Horace Tuck (1876–1951) was a prolific Norfolk artist and vice-principal of Norwich School of Art.

== Biography ==
Mainly a painter of oil and watercolour landscapes of his native Norfolk in England, Horace Tuck also travelled to France (particularly Dinan in Brittany), the Lake District and other parts of Britain on painting expeditions. Tuck's work was regularly exhibited in Norwich (he was a member of the Norwich Art Circle) and in London galleries, including in Bond Street. Apart from his earliest works, his paintings tend not to be dated. He trained at Norwich School of Art, where he became friendly with Alfred Munnings, and at Borough Road Training College, Isleworth, West London.

Horace Tuck also illustrated books on local subjects, including Inns and Taverns of Old Norwich. His wife, Elizabeth Mary, known as Bessie, was originally one of his pupils and an artist in her own right. They were married in 1910 and lived in Branksome Road, Norwich, until Tuck retired in 1939. They then moved to Sheringham, on the Norfolk coast, where Tuck continued to paint until his death aged 75. His widow Bessie died in 1965, and there are memorials to her and to her husband at St Faiths Crematorium near Norwich. They had no children.

Horace Tuck's paintings have occasionally turned up at auction in the past, but a discovery of around 200 of his paintings and a major exhibition in Holt, Norfolk in 2006 (with another scheduled for early March 2008) has created renewed interest in the artist. His later style has been compared by Simon Butler (in Lost Norfolk Landscapes: Paintings by Horace Tuck) to the work of British artists Ivon Hitchens and Paul Nash, suggesting that, despite Tuck's conventional choice of subject matter, he was not immune to the influences of modernism. Some of his works are in the collection of the Norwich Castle Museum and Art Gallery.
