= Public Illumination Magazine =

PIM No. 17 – Excess

Public Illumination Magazine (PIM) is an artists' periodical published since 1979, notable for its tiny size (11 × 7 cm). Each issue features a given topic. The general flavor of the contents ranges from parody to the absurd, with brevity a constant.

Public Illumination Magazine mocks the traditions of mainstream magazines. The pocket-size of the magazine, its use of pseudonyms, and its irreverent tone tweak the expectations produced by the large format glossy magazines. Long-time writers include: Sophie D. Lux, Fitty Sense, Rank Cologne, mr Basho and the King of France. The use of such pseudonyms is intended to mock contemporary mainstream magazines' obsession with celebrity.

Founded in underground art and literary circles in lower Manhattan by Zagreus Bowery; originally "non-weekly", later "non-monthly", then "non-biannual", it is now "non-occasional" and published in Italy.

Writers and artists who have contributed include: Ken Brown, Steve Dalachinsky, Keith Haring, Michael Madore, David Sandlin, Hal Sirowitz, Sparrow, Mike Topp, David Wojnarowicz, and Diane Torr.

Complete series of the magazine are held by the Museum of Modern Art in New York and the Pompidou Center in Paris.

Through 2017, 60 issues have been published covering the following themes:

- Telephones
- Virulence
- Mass Transit
- Little Girls
- Cosmetic Mutilation
- Livestock
- War Games
- Habits
- The Truth
- Husbands
- Artifice
- Tongues
- Civilization
- Rejects
- Idols
- Pain & Sorrow
- Excess
- Scales
- Technique
- Races
- Contraception
- Disguise
- Comestibles
- Vermin
- Flora & Fauna
- Heredity
- Instruments
- Propaganda
- Home
- Water Sports
- The Future
- Miracles
- Casualties
- Foreigners
- Youth
- Secrets
- Organs
- Fun
- Mother
- Hallucinations
- Underwear
- Enemies
- Shadows
- Neighbors
- Balls
- Busts
- Luxury
- Hair
- Climate
- Bullshit
- Passion
- Space
- Trash
- Spice
- Doom & Gloom
- Lethargy
- Vehicles
- Fortune
- Flesh
- Heaven

== Sources ==
- Caputi, Jane (1987). The age of sex crime. Popular Press. ISBN 978-0-87972-385-9. p140
- Caputi, Jane (2004). Goddesses and monsters: women, myth, power, and popular culture. Popular Press. ISBN 978-0-299-19624-0. p225
