= Edith Galliner =

Anglo-German artist

Edith Marguerite Galliner
- Born: Edith Marguerite Goldschmidt; 1914; London, England
- Died: 2000 (aged 85–86); Berlin, Germany
- Education: Camberwell School of Arts and Crafts; Central School of Art and Design
- Known for: Painting, pottery
- Spouse: Peter Galliner(1920 - 2006)

Edith Marguerite Galliner, née Goldschmidt, (1914–2000) was an Anglo-German artist who painted in acrylic and produced pottery, collages and etchings. Galliner was born in England but grew up in Germany only to return to England when the Nazi Party came to power in 1933. After the Second World War she divided her time between Britain and Germany and exhibited work in both countries.

== Biography ==
Galliner was born in London into a German-Jewish family who returned to Hamburg while she was still a baby. Galliner attended university in Berlin but when the Nazi Party came to power in 1933 she fled to Britain to avoid being arrested. She attended both the Camberwell School of Arts and Crafts and the Central School of Art and Design in London before training as a silversmith in Paris. Throughout 1938 and 1939 Galliner served as a travel companion to Jewish children being evacuated from Germany to Britain. After the Second World War, she taught painting and drawing in Cork and in London. From 1961 to 1965 Galliner was based in Berlin and concentrated on her art. She painted in acrylic, produced pottery and collages in a style clearly influenced by the Bauhaus and Die Brücke movements. Her paintings were often abstract and evoked submarine landscapes in a colour palette centred on deep blues. Galliner had solo exhibitions in Berlin during 1963, in Munich in 1964, at Cologne in 1965 and in London at the Hamilton Gallery beginning in 1967. The Galerie Wolfgang Gurlitt in Munich hosted an exhibition of her work in 1973. During her career Galliner took part in a number of group exhibitions including at the Camden Arts Centre in 1970 and was included in the Art in Exile in Great Britain 1933-1945 exhibition at the same venue in 1986. Annely Juda Fine Art hosted a number of shows during the 1970s and Galliner was included in a group show, London Artists from Germany, at the German Embassy in London in 1978. She died in Berlin in 2000 and a number of public galleries in that city hold examples of her work.
