= Charles William Cain =

English artist and Orientalist printmaker

Charles William Cain (1893–1962) was an English artist and Orientalist printmaker. His work is held in the British Museum and the V&A Museum.

== Life and career ==
Born in Surrey, Cain attended the Camberwell School of Art and then the Royal College of Art under Frank Short. He worked as an illustrator cartoonist for the Johannesburg Star before serving in World War I with the British Army as part of the Border Regiment. After the war the Imperial War Museum purchased some of his drawings. Much of his work included scenes from India and the Middle East. His work is held in the V&A Museum, the British Museum, the National Gallery of Art in the US, the Yale Center for British Art and the Fine Arts Museums of San Francisco.

Cain was exhibited at the Royal Academy regularly from 1921 to 1959.

During his lifetime his work received considerable coverage from notable publications such as the Illustrated London News the Westminster Gazette the Belfast Telegraph, The Scotsman and the Aberdeen Press and Journal.

== Publications ==
- 'Charles W. Cain : catalogue of drypoints.', pub Greatorex and Corner & Wood co, 1927.
