= Dermcidin =

Human protein

DCD
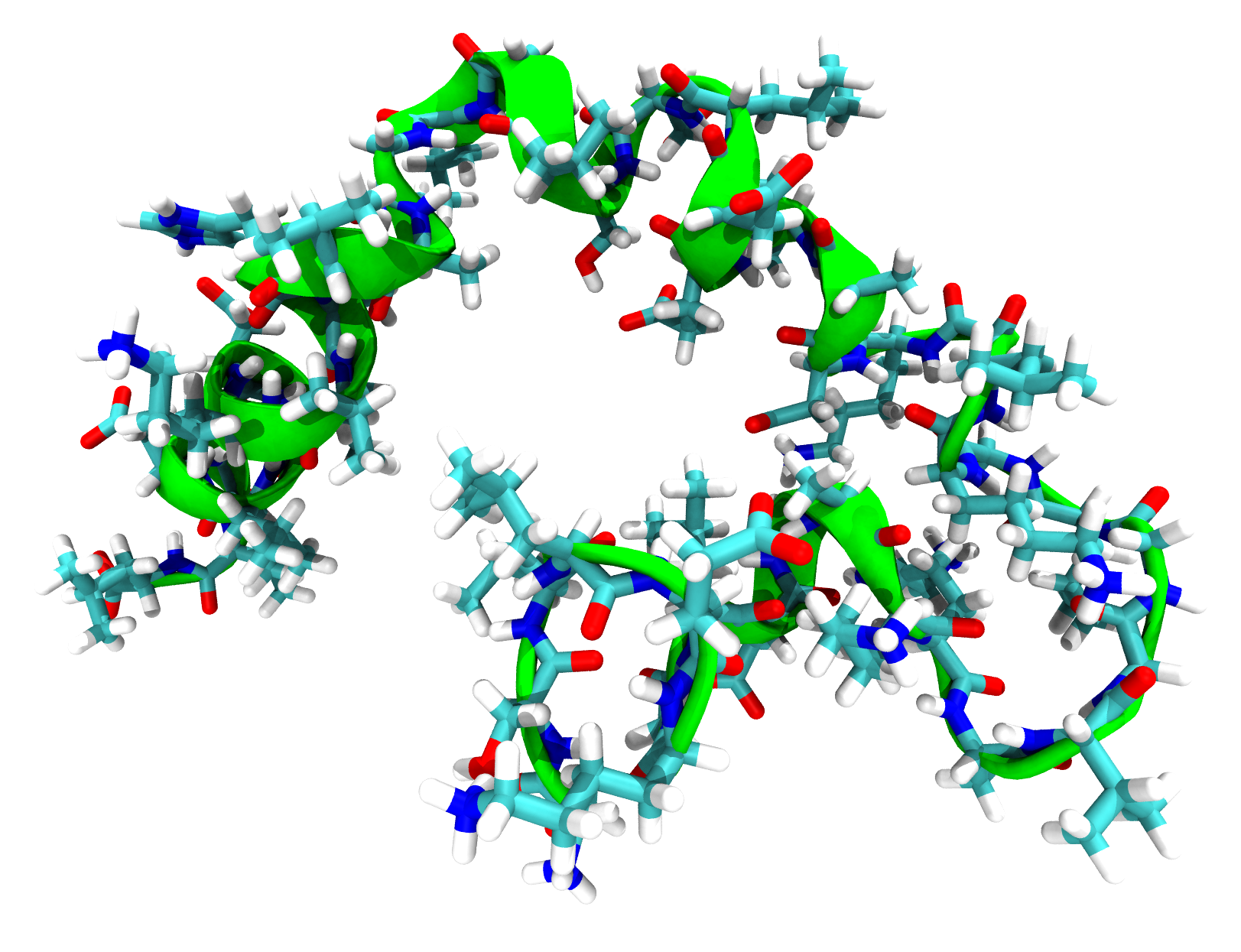
Available structures
| PDB | Human UniProt search: PDBe RCSB |
| PDB | List of PDB id codes 2YMK, 2KSG |

Identifiers
- Aliases: DCD, AIDD, DCD-1, DSEP, HCAP, PIF, dermcidin
- External IDs: OMIM: 606634; HomoloGene: 89039; GeneCards: DCD; OMA:DCD - orthologs

Gene location (Human)
| Chr. | Chromosome 12 (human) |
| Band | 12q13.2 | Start | 54,644,589 bp |
| Band | 12q13.2 | End | 54,648,493 bp |
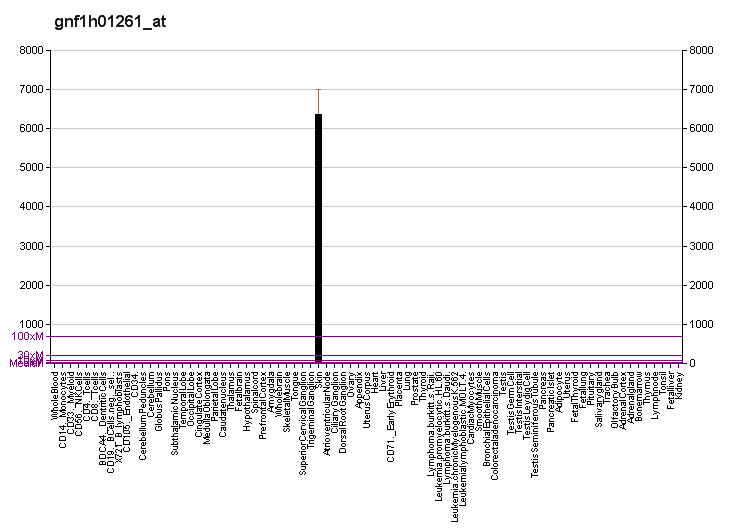
RNA expression pattern
| Bgee | Human / Mouse (ortholog); Top expressed in: skin of thigh; skin of hip; skin of abdomen; gonad; gastrocnemius muscle; right adrenal cortex; nipple; sural nerve; subcutaneous adipose tissue; popliteal artery / n/a; More reference expression data |
| BioGPS | More reference expression data |
Gene ontology
| Molecular function | peptidase activity; protein binding; hydrolase activity; RNA binding |
| Cellular component | extracellular exosome; extracellular matrix; extracellular region; extracellular space |
| Biological process | defense response to bacterium; proteolysis; antimicrobial humoral response; antimicrobial humoral immune response mediated by antimicrobial peptide; killing of cells of other organism; defense response to fungus |
Sources:Amigo / QuickGO
Orthologs
| Species | Human | Mouse |
| Entrez | 117159 | n/a |
| Ensembl | ENSG00000161634 | n/a |
| UniProt | P81605 | n/a |
| RefSeq (mRNA) | NM_053283; NM_001300854 | n/a |
| RefSeq (protein) | NP_001287783; NP_444513 | n/a |
| Location (UCSC) | Chr 12: 54.64 – 54.65 Mb | n/a |
| PubMed search | | n/a |
- Wikidata
| View/Edit Human |

Dermcidin is a protein with 110 amino acids that in humans is encoded by the DCD gene. The full-length protein produces derived peptides as proteolysis-inducing factor (PIF) and other anti-microbial peptides, secreted by human eccrine sweat glands onto the skin as a part of the innate host defense of the immune system. PIF is involved in muscular proteolysis.

== Function ==
Dermcidin is a secreted protein that is subsequently processed into mature peptides of distinct biological activities. The C-terminal peptide is constitutively expressed in sweat and has antibacterial and antifungal activities. The N-terminal peptide, also known as diffusible survival evasion peptide, promotes neural cell survival under conditions of severe oxidative stress. A glycosylated form of the N-terminal peptide may be associated with cachexia (muscle wasting) in cancer patients.

      Survival evasion peptide                            Antimicrobial peptide

YDPEAASAPGSGNPCHEASAAQKENAGEDPGLARQAPKPRKQRSSLLEKGLDGAKKAVGGLGKLGKDAVEDLESVGKGAVHDVKDVLDSVL

The C-terminal precursor DCD-1L is a 48 residue peptide that shows partial helicity in solution, as evidenced by the determination of its solution structure by NMR and CD-spectroscopy. The full length precursor is processed by undetermined proteases present in human sweat, to form several shorter peptides that show variable antimicrobial activity, named according to their C-terminal triplet of amino acids and their residue length. One such active peptide is SSL25, which shows a 2-fold increase in activity against E. coli compared to DCD-1L.

DCD-1L SSLLEKGLDGAKKAVGGLGKLGKDAVEDLESVGKGAVHDVKDVLDSVL
DCD-1  SSLLEKGLDGAKKAVGGLGKLGKDAVEDLESVGKGAVHDVKDVLDSV
SSL25  SSLLEKGLDGAKKAVGGLGKLGKDA

== Mechanism ==
The crystal structure of dermcidin has been solved in solution to reveal a hexameric helix-bundle, mediated by Zn ion binding. This is observed to form a tilted channel in membranes under computational examination by molecular dynamics simulations, and one suggested mechanism of antimicrobial action inferred from this observation is by ion gradient decoupling across biological membranes. This is supported by concurrent observations in experimental studies of a voltage dependent depolarization of lipid bilayers.
