= Camberwell College of Arts =

Art school at the University of the Arts London

Coordinates: 51.4742°N 0.0804°W

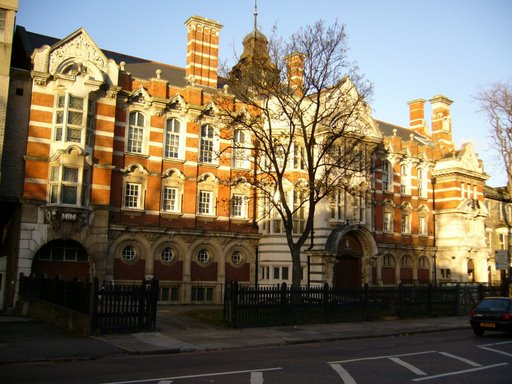
- Established: 1898
- Affiliations: University of the Arts London
- Location: London, United Kingdom
- Campus: Camberwell
- Website: arts.ac.uk/camberwell
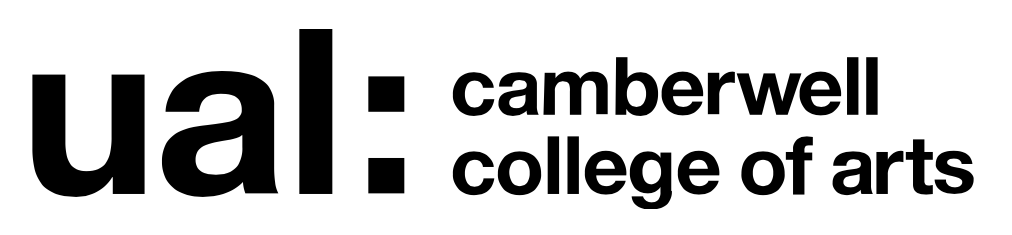

Camberwell College of Arts is a constituent college of the University of the Arts London, a public art and design university in London, England. The college offers further and higher education programmes, including postgraduate and PhD awards. The college has retained single degree options within Fine Art, offering specialist Bachelor of Arts courses in painting, sculpture, photography and drawing. It also runs graduate and postgraduate courses in fine art as well as design courses such as graphic design, illustration and 3D design. It has been ranked as the top British art school by The Times.

It was established as the Camberwell School of Arts and Crafts in 1898, and adopted its present name in 1989.

== History ==
The history of the College is closely linked with that of the South London Gallery, with which the College shares its site. The manager of the South London Working Men's College in 1868, William Rossiter, purchased the freehold of Portland House on which the College now stands in 1889. The resulting Gallery opened in 1891, followed by the Technical Institute in 1898.

The architect was Maurice Bingham Adams. Originally, the school offered classes in specific trades. By 1920, a Fine Art Department had been created.

During the Second World War, Victor Pasmore was appointed head of the painting department. Many well-known artists, including Frank Auerbach, Lawrence Gowing and Edward Ardizzone taught at Camberwell during this period. In 1973, the School expanded into a modern purpose-built block next to the existing premises. Both of them are now Listed Buildings.

In the 1980s, Wendy Smith became the head of Fine Art and employed Noel Forster, John Hilliard, Cornelia Parker, Phyllida Barlow, Gavin Jantjes and Ian McKeever. Tony Messenger and Eileen Hogan took charge of the graphics department, Eileen Hogan established and ran The Camberwell Press, and Eric Ayers presided over the typography school.

Camberwell temporarily lost its Fine Art courses but by 2004 the department had been fully restored to the College.

== Affiliations ==
Camberwell and its sister colleges Chelsea College of Arts and Wimbledon College of Arts makes up CCW, a three-college model that allows sharing of resources between colleges. CCW combined their foundation courses from the academic year starting in September 2011, and bases them at the Wilson Road campus in Camberwell.

== Peckham Platform ==
Peckham Platform is a public gallery dedicated to location-specific artwork made locally. Originally known as Peckham Space and part of Camberwell, in 2013 it became an independent charity.

== Notable alumni ==
- Novera Ahmed (sculptor)
- Reginald Fairfax Wells (sculptor and potter)
- Bernadette Ash (artist)
- Tanya Ashken (jeweller, silversmith and sculptor)
- Gillian Ayres RA (1989 Turner Prize nominee)
- Franko B (artist)
- Irene Bache (artist)
- Jeff Banks (graphic designer and TV presenter)
- Graham Coxon (musician)
- Roger "Syd" Barrett (musician, artist)
- Kate Blacker (artist)
- Quentin Blake (artist)
- Alan Brough (studio potter)
- Charles William Cain (artist)
- Seth Cardew (potter)
- Gillian Carnegie (2005 Turner Prize nominee)
- Lady Sarah Chatto (artist)
- Alan Charlton (artist)
- Sue Clowes (fashion designer)
- Darren Coffield (artist)
- Joshua Compston (curator)
- Jean Cooke (artist)
- Neisha Crosland (textile designer)
- Sheila Mary Denning (artist)
- Des'ree (singer)
- Kimathi Donkor (artist)
- Roy Turner Durrant (artist)
- Uzo Egonu (artist)
- Dave Elsey (Oscar-winning makeup effects artist)
- Georgina von Etzdorf (textile designer)
- Anthony Eyton RA (artist)
- Barry Fantoni (artist, writer, jazz musician, performer)
- Valerian Bernard Freyberg, 3rd Baron Freyberg (British Peer)
- Andrew Forge (artist and Dean of Yale School of Art)
- Sir Terry Frost RA (artist)
- Anaïs Gallagher (Model and Photographer)
- Edith Galliner (artist)
- Nicky Gavron (politician)
- Catherine Goodman (artist, BP Portrait Award winner)
- Liz Murray (artist)
- Maggi Hambling CBE (artist)
- Tom Hammick (Jerwood Drawing Prize winner)
- Anna Henckel-Donnersmarck (filmmaker and curator)
- Howard Hodgkin (1985 Turner Prize winner)
- Eileen Hogan (artist)
- Rachael House (artist)
- Joan Hutt (artist)
- Karl Hyde (musician)
- Jeffrey Isaac (painter and video artist)
- Andrzej Jackowski (1991 John Moores Painting Prize winning artist)
- Chantal Joffe (artist)
- Andy Dog Johnson (artist and illustrator)
- David Jones (artist and poet)
- Lucy Jones
- Zebedee Jones (artist)
- John Keane (artist)
- John Kiki (figurative painter)
- Peter Kindersley (publisher)
- R. B. Kitaj (artist)
- Svetlana K-Lie (artist)
- Peter, Hereditary Prince of Yugoslavia (aka, Petar III Karađorđević) (graphic design)
- Nigel Konstam (sculptor)
- Dimitri Launder (artist)
- Natasha Law (artist)
- Mike Leigh (film director)
- Laurence Llewelyn-Bowen (interior designer and TV presenter)
- Humphrey Lyttelton (jazz musician)
- Raphael Maklouf (sculptor)
- Sargy Mann (artist)
- Alvin Marriott (sculptor)
- Mark McGowan (artist)
- Margaret Mee (artist)
- Theodore Mendez (artist)
- Keith Milow (artist)
- Cathy de Monchaux (1998 Turner Prize nominee)
- Junko Mori (artist)
- Annie Morris (artist)
- Malcolm Morley (1984 Turner Prize winner)
- Kate Moross (designer/illustrator)
- Gregor Muir (director, ICA, London)
- Ella Naper (artist)
- Frank Newbould (poster artist)
- Dennis H. Osborne (artist)
- Jean Osborne (artist)
- Daf Palfrey (film producer)
- Tom Phillips R.A. CBE (artist)
- Liz Pichon (illustrator)
- Rose Pipette (musician)
- Lesley Rankine (musician)
- John Ravera (sculptor)
- Ruth Raymond (artist)
- Matthew Ritchie (artist)
- Tim Roth (actor)
- George Rowlett (artist)
- John Shaw (stone carver)
- Gilbert Spencer R.A. (artist)
- Bodo Sperlein (designer)
- Matthew Stone (artist)
- Daniel Sturgis (artist)
- Angus Suttie (potter)
- Alan Thornhill (sculptor)
- Euan Uglow (artist)
- Keith Vaughan (artist)
- Florence Welch (musician)
- Alexander Williams (animator)
- Denis Williams (artist)
- Joe Wright (BAFTA award-winning director)

== Notable academics ==
- Yolanda Sonnabend (theatre and ballet designer and painter)
- Rebecca Salter (artist and president of the Royal Academy of Arts)
