= Charles Mayes Wigg =

English artist

Charles Mayes Wigg (13 January 1889 – 2 March 1969) was an English artist.

== Biography ==
Charles Mayes Wigg was born in Nottingham, England, on 13 January 1889. The eldest son of Mayes Wigg, a bank manager, and Agnes Wigg (formerly Sudbury), he grew up at Watton and Cromer in Norfolk and was educated at Gresham's School. In 1911, he arrived at the Norwich School of Art and later studied with Frank Spenlove-Spenlove at his Yellow Door School of Art in Beckenham, Kent.

During the First World War, Wigg served with the British Army and saw active service at Gaza. In 1916, he was invalided out of the army with severe leg injuries, and was left with a disability for the rest of his life.

Returning to his career as an artist and illustrator, he subsequently found life afloat easier than life on land and for many years lived and painted in a house- boat on the Norfolk Broads. He also had studios at The Thatched House, Brundall, his parents' home, and at Rose Cottage, Barton Turf.

In 1952, Wigg married his mother's nurse, but this was disastrous for his artistic career. His new wife prevented him from painting, breaking his brushes and burning his paintings. Later, he tried to take up his work again but failed to achieve what he wanted. He died at St Mary's Hospital, Eastbourne, on 2 March 1969, leaving an estate of £47,510. At the time of his death, he was living at East Hoathly, Sussex.

== Works ==
Wigg was a landscape artist working mostly in watercolours and as an etcher, with only occasional paintings in oils. The Norfolk coast and scenery of the Broads gave him the subjects for his work, and his etchings were mostly of boats. He exhibited regularly at the Norwich Art Circle between 1909 and 1936, at the Royal Academy in 1915 and also with the British Water-colour Society.
