= Eileen Hogan =

London figurative painter

Eileen Hogan (born 1946) is a figurative painter, who lives and works in London. She has shown in museums and private galleries in the UK and America. Her retrospective exhibition at the Yale Center for British Art in New Haven, USA in 2019, accompanied by a book published by Yale University Press, focused particularly on two dominant themes – enclosed gardens and portraiture. She is a professor emeritus at the University of the Arts London, a trustee of the Royal Drawing School, and an ambassador for the Salveson Mindroom Centre, a Scottish charity.

== Education ==
Eileen Hogan studied at Camberwell School of Arts and Crafts, the Royal Academy Schools, Royal College of Art and the British School at Athens.

== Work ==
Through painterly analysis Hogan explores the importance of green spaces in an urban environment and the relationship between portraiture and biography. Her time as Artist-in-Residence at the Garden Museum in 2018 consolidated her investigations of an expanded notion of what gardens are, their dynamics, the way that they are used, the patterns of life they generate and their impact on health.

Since 2009 Hogan has collaborated with the oral history charity, National Life Stories, at the British Library in order to reflect on biograph, self-image and informality in portraiture. She works with an oral historian to establish the impact that a detailed narration of a life story might have on a sitter's presence. She expanded on this when she was one of five artists invited by Tate Research to each construct a filmed life class at Tate Modern (one thread of the Leverhulme-funded Tate research project: Art School Educated). Hogan's film explored the way that stories underlie how we see the world and it was shown in the Tate Britain Display – Reception, Rupture and Return: The Model and the Life Room in 2015. Her 'conversation' with Alan Rusbridger in 2021, after being commissioned to paint his portrait for Lady Margaret Hall, describes her process of painting Rusbridger during a very volatile period of history (2019–21).

In 2023 Hogan was the first woman to be commissioned as official Coronation artist. Her series of seventeen works explored what painting could bring to an event which was filmed in such detail for TV and screened worldwide, isolating significant moments - ritualistic, spiritual or simply extremely human. The paintings will be housed in the Royal Collection.

== Selected solo exhibitions ==
- Eileen Hogan, Browse & Darby London, 2020-2024
- Eileen Hogan: Personal Geographies Yale Centre for British Art US 2019
- Personal Geographies Browse & Darby London 2019
- Artists-Not-In-Residence The Garden Museum London 2018
- Edges and Enclosurers Browse & Darby London 2015
- Vacant Possession New Art Centre, Roche Court, Salisbury 2013
- Eileen Hogan at Little Sparta, The Fleming Collection London and the Stockwood Discovery Centre Luton Museums 2013
