= Ruth Raymond =

British artist (1897-1986)

- Born: Florence Laura Ruth Raymond; 1897; Greenwich, London
- Died: 1986 (aged 88–89); Hampshire, England
- Education: Camberwell School of Arts and Crafts; Greenwich Polytechnic; Royal College of Art
- Known for: Painting, calligraphy

Florence Laura Ruth Raymond (1897–1986) was a British painter, calligrapher and weaver.

== Biography ==
Raymond was born and raised in Greenwich in London where she attended The John Roan School before studying at the Camberwell School of Arts and Crafts from 1914 to 1917. She then spent two years at Greenwich Polytechnic before entering the Royal College of Art, where her teachers included the painter Robert Anning Bell. Before she graduated from the Royal College in 1921, Raymond had already exhibited works at the 1920 Arts and Crafts Exhibition at Burlington House in London. She continued to exhibit at that venue until at least 1940, by which time she was teaching weaving at the Gloucester School of Art and exhibiting her paintings and other works throughout the south-west of England. Raymond was a skilled calligrapher and worked with Graily Hewitt on several Books of Remembrance for Westminster Abbey and also produced the Record Book of Gloucester Cathedral, which also has examples of her weaving.

Raymond lived for a long period at Brookthorpe in Gloucestershire and died in Hampshire.
