= Svetlana K-Liée =

International Artist

- Svetlana Kuleshova
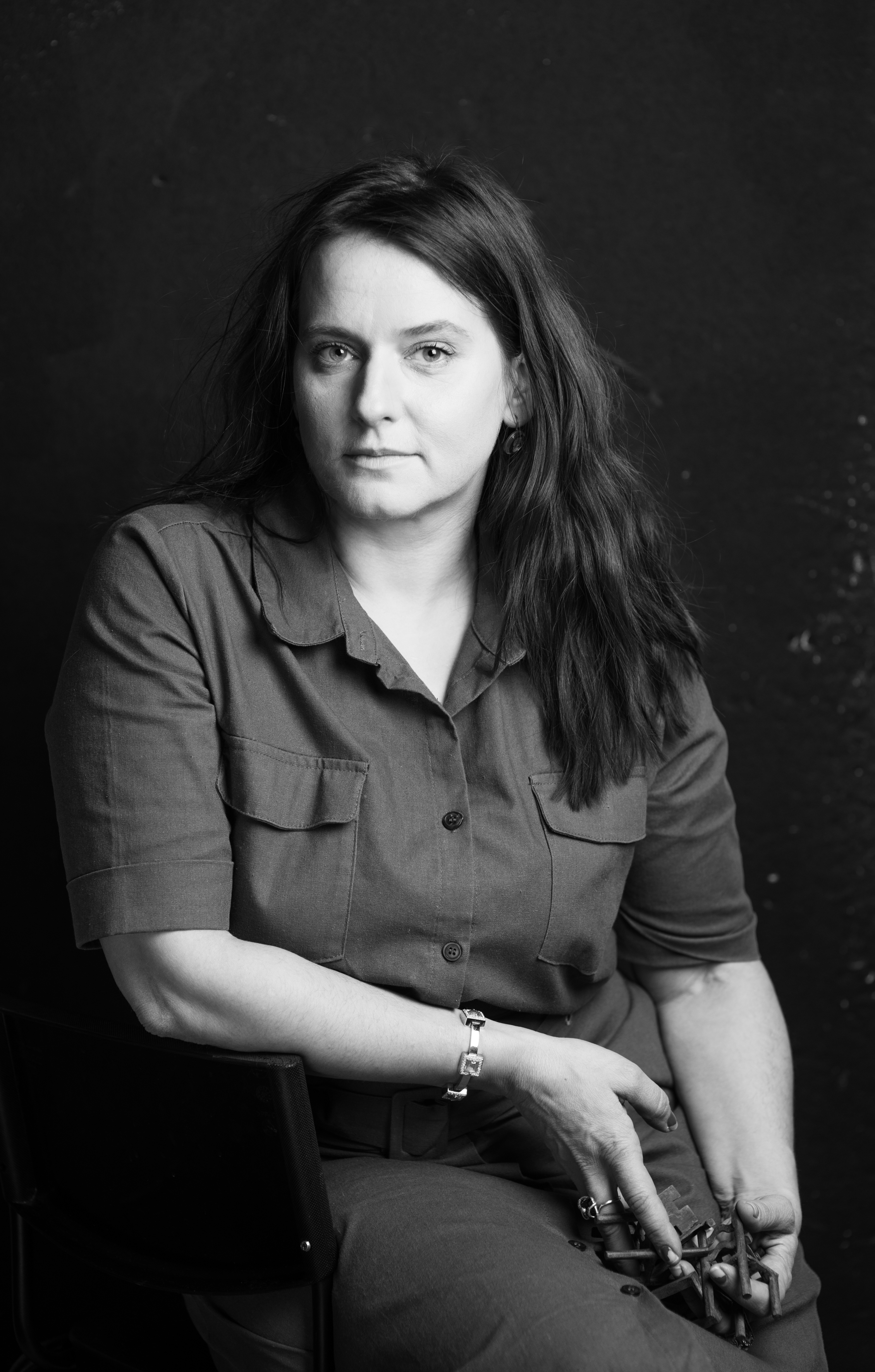
- Svetlana K-liée photoshoot 2024
- Born: 24.09.1977; Moscow
- Citizenship: UK
- Family: Svetlana has three children
- Website: https://www.k-liee.com

Svetlana K-Liée (born 1977, Moscow) is a Russian contemporary artist living and working in Brighton, United Kingdom. Originally trained as a sculptor, her multidisciplinary practice encompasses sculpture, drawing, printmaking, photography, porcelain and recently glass. Her work explores themes of identity, spirituality and gender through experimentation with diverse materials and processes.

== Early life and education ==
K-Liée was born in Moscow and received her early artistic training in Russia. In 2000, she graduated with a Master of Arts from the Moscow Faculty of Applied Arts. She subsequently continued her professional development at the I. I. Nevinsky Etching Art Studio and the Babushkinski Ceramic Studio, where she expanded her practice into printmaking and ceramics. In 2001 she became a member of the Union of Artists, initially joining the Prints Department before later transitioning to the Sculpture Department. During this period she developed technical proficiency across bronze casting, etching, ceramics and graphic media. In 2006, she relocated to England and continued her studies at Camberwell College of Arts, University of the Arts London, graduating in 2007 with a Master of Arts in Drawing, where she was recognised among the leading graduates of her cohort.

== Artistic Practice ==
Initially focused on figurative and material-based sculpture, K-Liée’s work evolved into an interdisciplinary practice combining sculptural processes with varying art mediums. Her artistic language frequently investigates psychological states, transformation and emotional resilience, using varying ideologies from different cultures as metaphors for inner change. The artist adopted the name “K-Liée” during a residency in Paris at the Cité internationale des arts. The name emerged from the ideas of a “key” and of being “connected,” (clé and lié respectively) reflecting her understanding of artistic practice as a bridge between the spiritual and the real. Concepts of connection and transition remain central to her work. Spirituality forms an important dimension of her artistic philosophy. Her works often explore metaphysical themes and symbolic narratives, addressing questions of identity, displacement and renewal through fragile or transformative materials. Transparency, layering and repetition frequently appear as visual devices suggesting memory and passage between states.

== Material and Research ==
Although trained in bronze and steel sculpture, K-Liée has increasingly focused on porcelain and glass in recent years. Through multiple international residencies at TaoXiChuan in JingDeZhen, China, historically associated with imperial porcelain production, she has explored the expressive potential of the fragile materials and developed new porcelain-based sculptural works combining traditional craftsmanship with contemporary conceptual approaches. This has been through old and new projects, such as Chebu-Rasha, a signature series of self expression through many different lenses, or even her newest series, Spider-Berries, made so far out of glass, referencing gender and spiritual topics. Her porcelain journey initially started at the Imperial Porcelain Factory, Saint Petersburg, Russia, where she had been invited to work for multiple years, to build and evolve her porcelain skills and knowledge. These material investigations mark a shift in her practice toward more ephemeral and process-driven forms while maintaining sculptural thinking rooted in volume and spatial presence.

== Exhibitions ==
K-Liée’s work has been exhibited internationally in museums, galleries and art fairs across Europe, Russia, Asia and the United States. Her work has been exhibited in major museums in Moscow and St.Petersburg as well as in the Saatchi Gallery in London in 2010. In 2009 she collaborated with Michael Nyman on the occasion of the Anglo-Moskva Festival in Moscow and was commissioned a sculpture by the Third Moscow Biennale of Contemporary Art. Her international presence expanded significantly in the 2020s, with exhibitions and art fair participation including Art Miami, the Hamptons Art Fair and exhibitions connected to museum venues in China, including presentations associated with the History of Shanghai Museum. Travel and residency programmes have played an important role in shaping her evolving cross-cultural artistic practice.

== Commissions ==
K-Liée has produced both public and ceremonial sculptural works. Most recently, in 2026 she was commissioned to design and create the award sculpture for the Liberatum Awards in Madrid, continuing her engagement with symbolic sculptural objects and cultural events. In 2013, she was also commissioned for this and her sculpture was awarded to John Hurt.

== Awards and Recognition ==
In 2004, she received the title of Best Female Sculptor of Russia, followed in 2005 by Best Young Sculptor of Russia. Two of her etchings were selected by the Hermitage Museum collection. In 2010 she was runner-up in the Best Sculpture category at the Battle Contemporary Fine Art Fair and received third prize in the RK Harrison Prize for Art Photography at the National Open Art Competition. The same year, her work gained recognition across multiple disciplines, reflecting the expanding scope of her practice. One of her steel sculptures was selected for the Open West Competition in 2011, and her work has also been recognised in national sculpture prizes, including selection among leading works at the Broomhill National Sculpture Prize (Top 10 Sculptures of England, 2012).
