= Gillian Carnegie =

English artist

- Born: 1971 (age 54–55); Suffolk, England
- Education: Camberwell School of Art and Royal College of Art

Gillian Carnegie (born 1971 in Suffolk) is an English artist.

Carnegie is a graduate of the Camberwell School of Art and the Royal College of Art.

Carnegie works within traditional categories of painting – still life, landscape, the figure and portraiture – with a highly accomplished technique. Yet while apparently following the conventions of representational painting, Carnegie challenges its established languages and unsettles its assumptions. Her work builds up the oil paint to create an almost sculptural relief of impasto. This technique is most effective in her Black Square paintings where the dense layerings of black oils coalesce to form dense woodlands.

Nominated to the 2005 Turner Prize shortlist at London's Tate Britain gallery, her apparently traditional use of the oil medium prompted the Daily Telegraph headline: 'Turner Prize shocker: the favourite is a woman who paints flowers. Whatever next?' – in allusion to the medium-combative nature of the prize. She was beaten to the prize by Simon Starling's Shedboatshed.

In 2013 Carnegie exhibited at Tate Britain in 'Painting Now: Five Contemporary Artists'. "I never felt the need to feel informed about the experience of seeing a painting in order that I understand it...I'd like to think someone would still want to look at a painting rather than inform themselves about it beforehand"
