= San Angelo Museum of Fine Arts =

Coordinates: 31.4570°N 100.4327°W

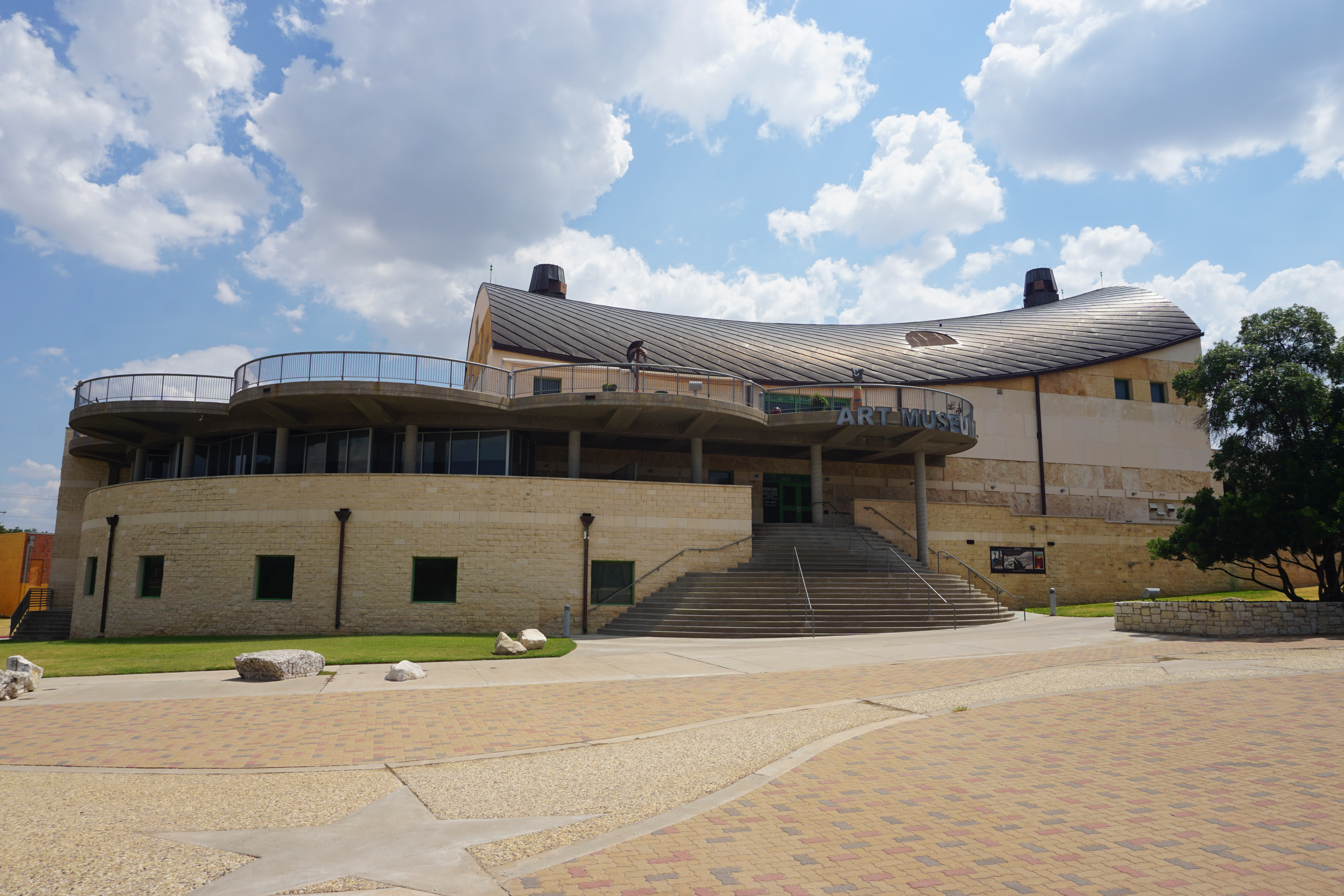
- The San Angelo Museum of Fine Arts in 2019
- Established: 1981
- Location: San Angelo, Texas, USA
- Type: Art museum
- Accreditation: American Alliance of Museums
- Architect: Hardy Holzman Pfeiffer Associates
- Website: www.samfa.org

The San Angelo Museum of Fine Arts is an art museum serving 14 counties located in San Angelo, Texas. The museum features a growing permanent collection and is home to traveling exhibitions. In addition, it features a research library, an education wing, a rooftop sculpture collection, and community meeting space.

== History ==
In July 1981, members of the community of San Angelo came together with the goal of creating a museum of fine arts and established a nonprofit organization for this purpose. After sufficient funds were raised, the museum opened in the renovated former Quartermaster Building at historic Fort Concho in San Angelo. The museum opened in the spring of 1985 and was home to traveling exhibitions from the National Portrait Gallery, the Library of Congress, and the Dallas Museum of Art. In 1994, the decision was made to build a new dedicated building for the museum. Over $7.2 million were raised for its construction and the new facility opened on the banks of the Concho River in September, 1999. The museum has won many awards, including the National Award for Museum Service from the Institute of Museum and Library Services in 2003. In 2005, the museum gained accreditation by the American Alliance of Museums. The museum now averages around 90,000 visitors a year. The permanent collection holds 277 items focusing primarily on Texas artists.

== Facilities ==
The San Angelo Museum of Fine Arts is directly across the Concho River from downtown San Angelo and adjacent to the city's River Front concert stage. A winding pedestrian bridge connects the museum to the other side of the river and the parks that run alongside it. The building was designed by the architecture firm Hardy Holzman Pfeiffer Associates. The controversial design features a curved roof designed to resemble a saddle or Conestoga wagon and uses an eclectic mix of local materials including limestone and end-grain Texas mesquite. The building features 30,000 sq ft (2,800 m^{2}) and two main gallery areas with 45-ft and 35-ft ceilings. It also includes two smaller galleries, a rooftop terrace that serves as a sculpture garden overlooking the river and downtown San Angelo, a research library, an education wing and office, and support space. The museum has purchased a block of once-dilapidated buildings and renovated them into gallery space, which it rents out to artists and a new Water Education Center which is operated jointly by the museum and Upper Colorado River Authority.

== Exhibitions and juried competitions ==
- EnPleinAir TEXAS, 2016, 35 artists from 18 states painted images from the area around San Angelo.
- 21st San Angelo National Ceramic Competition, 2016
- 2014/2015 Third Annual Richard and Pam Salmon Sculpture Competition
- 2005/2006 Retrospective of pop artist James Gill
