= Alice Potts =

British biotech fashion designer and researcher

- Born: Leicester
- Education: Norwich University of the Arts (BA), Royal College of Arts (MA)
- Occupations: Biomaterialist; artist; researcher

Alice Potts is a British biomaterialist, artist, and researcher who became known for her biomaterialist art, most notably growing crystals out of human sweat, which were grown onto the pieces sweated on. She is also known for her biomaterial sequins and her crystals grown from human tears.

== Biography ==
She was born in Leicester, and earned a BA from the Norwich University of the Arts in womenswear. She then went on to earn a MA at the Royal College of Arts, where she participated in a nine-month project called the Biodesign Challenge and first learned about biomaterials. She served as a post-graduate scholar at the Alexander S. Onassis Foundation for one year. During her time in Athens, she collected the sweat of two hundred Athenians.

During her time at the Royal College of Arts, she became interested in sweat and began working with a bioengineering team at the Imperial College London to purify sweat to only the eccrine and crystallize it. She soon became known for her "Perspire" collection, where she utilizes the technique she experimented with to crystallize sweat on pieces of clothing as part of a message of equality. She has notably worked with baseball caps and ballet shoes.

She has also grown crystals from tears and urine.

She also created a series of 20 PPE face shields out of food waste called "Dance Biodegradable Personal Protective Equipment (DBPPE) Post Covid Facemasks", which were exhibited at the National Gallery of Victoria. That same year, she collaborated with Mimco to create a series of twenty one-of-a-kind jewelry pieces utilizing sequins produced from biomaterials. In 2025, she was featured in "Dirty Looks" at the Barbican Centre.
