= Flint Institute of Arts =

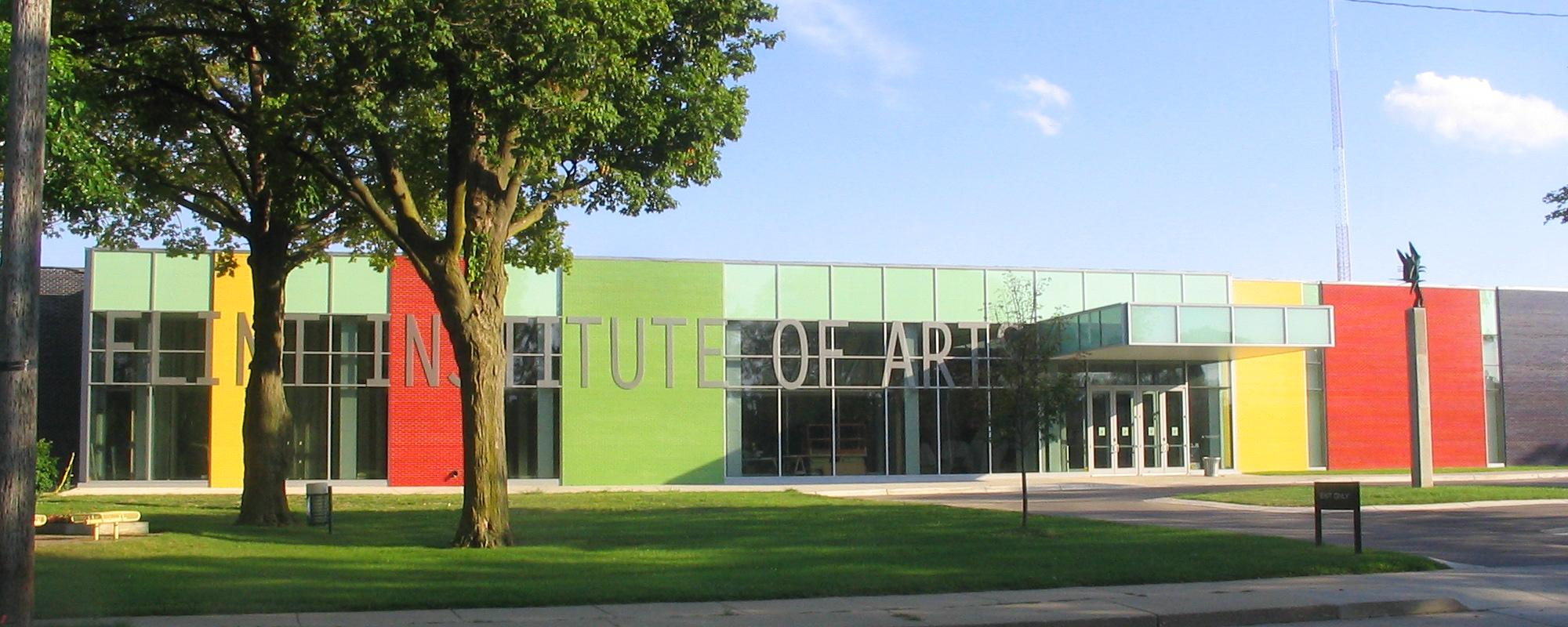
- Flint Institute of Arts
- Established: 1928
- Location: Flint, Michigan
- Coordinates: 43.02237°N 83.67778°W
- Type: Art museum
- Collection size: 8,000+
- Visitors: 160,000 (annually)
- Director: Tracee J. Glab
- Website: flintarts.org

The Flint Institute of Arts (FIA) is located in the Flint Cultural Center in Flint, Michigan, United States. The second largest art museum in the state, it offers exhibitions, interpretive programs, film screenings, concerts, lectures, family events and educational outreach programs to people of various ages, serving over 160,000 adults and children a year.

== History ==
The Flint Institute of Arts was established in 1928 by leaders in the community who wanted a place where students could pursue art courses and the community could enjoy exhibitions. In 1958, FIA moved to its current location in the Flint Cultural Center. After a much-needed renovation in 2005, the current facility is 150,000 sq. ft., with over 25,000 sq. ft. of gallery space.

== About ==
The Flint Institute of Arts is the second largest art museum in the state of Michigan and one of the largest museum art schools in the nation. Each year, more than 160,000 people visit its galleries and participate in FIA programs and services.

For 90 years, the FIA has been responsible for acquiring, protecting and presenting a collection of art and artifacts spanning continents and 5,000 years. The collection, which exceeds 8,000 objects, is significant for its depth of European and American paintings and sculptures, 15th century to the present, and its holdings of decorative and applied arts, including ethnographic study collections dating back five millennia.

== Accreditation and grants ==
- Accreditations
  - American Association of Museums (now the American Alliance of Museums)
- Grants
  - 2015: Received a $1.96 million operating grant from the Charles Stewart Mott Foundation
  - 2016: Received a $100,000 grant from PNC for the FIA's START Program

== Collection and exhibitions ==
The permanent collection includes more than 8,000 works of art. The Flint Institute of Arts has assembled collections of American, European, Native American, African, and Asian art, including paintings, sculptures, prints, drawings, and decorative arts. Highlights of the collection include 15th- to 18th-century English, French, and Italian decorative arts; a rare shaped panel by Peter Paul Rubens; a complete set of 17th-century French tapestries; American and French Impressionist and Post-Impressionist paintings; Hudson River School paintings; regional and Great Lakes paintings; and abstract expressionist and photorealist paintings.

Artists that are featured in the collection include Auguste Renoir, John Singer Sargent, Mary Cassatt, Thomas Hart Benton, Andrew Wyeth, Duane Hanson, and Barbara Sorensen.

FIA puts on multiple exhibitions during the year. Some exhibitions that have been featured are Picasso, Rodin, Toulouse-Lautrec, and Jerry Taliaferro.
