= Art Innsbruck =

ART Innsbruck is an international fair for contemporary art held annually in Innsbruck. The 4-square-kilometre (1.5 sq mi) fair features about 70 exhibitors from 8 to 10 nations presenting fine art of the 20th and 21st centuries. It is organized by the Development Association of Fine Arts and is the second largest art fair in Austria, second only to ART Vienna.

ART Innsbruck was started in 1997 and has taken place since the foundation every year in February. It is held at the fair hall of Innsbruck. Events include "ART-Clubbing", the "ART-Lounge" and art seminars for beginners and collectors.

At the program: fine arts from the 20th and 21st century – paintings, original prints, works on paper, editions, sculptures, photography, new media.

== For art lovers and collectors ==
Paintings, works on paper, original graphics, sculptures, editions, photography, new mediums, multiples, objects and installations – the ART Innsbruck presents international fine art of the 20th and 21st century.

Maximum seventy exhibitors are allowed. Thereby and through the selected exhibitor jury the ART Innsbruck obtains her small and very fine, exclusive ambience. The ART Innsbruck is conceived according to international valid criteria for art fairs.

Under the motto "For art lovers and collectors" are gallery owners, artists, and experts meeting. The fair is a mediator between creators of art, art providers and art friends, as well as galleries and the public. The fair has now become indispensable as a meeting point for local and international art scene.

== History ==
- 1997: First fair under the name "editions of art", start in hall 1 of the fair Innsbruck
- 1998: Change of the name to "ART Innsbruck"
- 1999: 20 percent increase of visitors
- 2000: Enlargement of the exhibition space to 4,000 square metres (43,000 sq ft) and move to hall 4 of the fair Innsbruck
- 2002/2003: expansion to Vienna: Foundation of the ART Vienna according to the same concept
- 2002/2003: expansion to Vienna: Foundation of the ART Vienna according to the same concept
- 2006: Relaunch of the name ART international fair for contemporary art Innsbruck
- 2007/2008: Beginning of the side events ART-Clubbing and the year-round ART-Lounge with lifestyle audience
- 2012: Chaningin the company name into "ART Kunstmesse"
- 2013: Visitors record: more than 17,000 visitors on all fair days
- 2015: Expansion of the fair program to contemporary art and antiques of the 19th, 20th and 21st century under the slogan "Art of the centuries for lovers and collectors"
