= I Was Lord Kitchener's Valet =

Clothing store in 1960s London

Coordinates: 51°31′8.6″N 0°12′27.7″W

I Was Lord Kitchener's Valet is a clothing boutique which achieved fame in 1960s "Swinging London" by promoting antique military uniforms as fashion items.

I Was Lord Kitchener's Valet was opened by Ian Fisk and John Paul soon joined by Robert Orbach at 293 Portobello Road Notting Hill, London, in 1965. Among the shop's customers were Eric Clapton, Mick Jagger, John Lennon and Jimi Hendrix.

Robert Orbach arranged for his ex boss Warren Gold aka Lord John to rent the shop in Wardour Street to John Paul. Another new branch of Kitchener's was opened in Foubert's Place, off Carnaby Street, also arranged by Orbach selling militaria and Swinging London novelty items, that was rented from Henry Moss and Harry Fox of Lady Jane fame.

In 1967 two more Kitchener's outlets opened on Carnaby Street and later expanded to sites in Piccadilly Circus and then King's Road (where the shop was named I Was Lord Kitchener's Thing). The military uniforms on sale largely consisted of scarlet tunics derived from pre-1914 stocks that had been withdrawn from regular army use upon the outbreak of World War I.

In the summer of 1967, Fisk and Paul dissolved their partnership. Fisk took sole ownership of the Portobello road premises, which became the Injun Dog head-shop (subtitled Once I Was Lord Kitchener's Valet).

The last Kitchener's outlet in Coventry Street closed its doors in 1977, but is still remembered as an important Swinging Sixties boutique.

The New Vaudeville Band recorded a song titled "I Was Lord Kitchener's Valet", in tribute to the shop, which didn't chart.

In 2021, John Paul relaunched I Was Lord Kitchener's Valet as an online boutique.
