= Lauren Gold =

English model and actress

- Born: 9 January 1981 (age 45); Enfield, London, England
- Occupations: Model; actress
- Years active: 1993–present
- Spouse: Gabe Turner (m. 2011)
- Modelling information
- Height: 5 ft 8.5 in (1.74 m)
- Hair colour: Brown
- Eye colour: Hazel
- Agency: Models 1; Unity Models; Modelwerk; Cathy Quinn Models; Francina Models; Stockholmsgruppen; Next Models Los Angeles; Central Models; Shine Group; Team Modeller; IMM; MC2; Images; Spot 6 Management

Lauren Gold (born 9 January 1981) is an English model and actress. She is most recognised as the DJ in Robbie Williams's "Rock DJ" music video as well as her recurring appearance in La Senza ad campaigns. Gold's best known acting role is Scarlett Rose in Sky One drama Dream Team.

Gold is among the top 1000 models on Fashion Model Directory. Her major clients include Grazia, Glamour, Cosmopolitan, Marie Claire, Woman, Woman & Home, She magazine, Marks & Spencer, Figleaves, La Senza, Bora Aksu, People Tree, Next, Debenhams, John Lewis, Gray & Osbourn, Littlewoods, Ballet Lingerie, Nefer Lingerie, Triumph International, Jockey Underwear, Brilleland, Truworths, TK Maxx, Pantene, Lenor, Coca-Cola, and Vodafone.

== Career ==
=== Modelling ===
When Gold was 13, her mother, who had been a model in the 1960s, sent pictures of her to children's modelling agencies. Her first agency was Now Models. One of her earliest jobs was an appearance in music videos by Roxette.

Due to her height and build, Gold was able to segue from child model to fashion model. She left Now and signed with Select Model Management in London where she was developed into a fashion model. In the fall of 1996, she appeared on the cover of Marie Claire in the United Kingdom. Early in her career, she appeared in MJ Cole's "Crazy Love" video as well as adverts for Marks & Spencer and Next. In 2000, Gold landed the lead in Robbie Williams' "Rock DJ".

By 2002, Gold left Select in favor for Take 2 Model Management. Gold signed with now defunct Take 2 Model Management who represented top fashion models such as Natalia Vodianova, Esther Canadas and Jacquetta Wheeler. While at Take 2, Gold branched out as both an editorial model as well as a commercial model. Despite being a fashion model, Gold has appeared in men's magazine Maxim as well as advertisements for Coca-Cola and Vodafone.

In 2004, Gold modelled for lingerie catalogue Figleaves up until 2005. She also did a campaign for Janet Reger lingerie which was shot by Oliver Pearce. In October 2005, she walked in the Agent Provocateur Charity Fashion Show in London. The following year, Gold left Take 2 and signed with NEXT London. With Next, Gold landed her most lucrative endorsement deal to date with La Senza. She has been featured on the website, catalogues and advertisements for the lingerie company. Despite filming for Dream Team, Gold continued to land campaigns including Truworths in South Africa. In 2007, she was featured in two commercials for Norwegian eyewear brand, Brilleland. In addition, Gold took part of the Amber Fashion-Grand Prix and Fashion Unite. Gold along with Petra Nemcova, Jessica Sjöö, Tereza Maxová and Lena Gercke walked in the Charity Fashion Show in Monaco.

In 2008, Gold signed to Models 1. That same year, she became the editorial face of Pantene Pro-V Shine in the United Kingdom as well as landing campaigns for Bora Aksu and People Tree. Since then, Gold has featured in advertisements for Jockey Underwear, Triumph International, Ballet Lingerie and Wonderbra.

In 2010, Gold was featured in an advertorial for Elizabeth Arden as well as a British commercial for Lenor fabric softener. In late 2010, Gold could be seen modelling for British clothing company East Ltd, Debenhams, Gray & Bourne, and Damsel in a Dress. In September 2010, Gold was featured in an editorial spread for She magazine in the UK. Additionally, she signed with Cathy Quinn Models in New York.

In early 2011, Gold continued to model for East as well as Gray and Osbourn. In spring 2011, she became the face of TK Maxx in the United Kingdom and Ireland. She was featured in two television commercials as well as several print ads photographed by Jason Bell. By summer 2011, Gold shot campaigns for Figleaves.com, John Lewis and Littlewoods. She was featured in Figleaves.com's Autumn/Winter 2011 Lookbook. In September 2011, Gold landed in the Top 1000 Models on Fashion Model Directory. In late 2011, she landed a campaign for Gleneagles Hotel which was featured in Tatler magazine. In February 2012, she was featured in a swimwear campaign with M&Co. She also did a campaign for Debenhams and David M Robinson Jewellery. In late 2012, Gold shot several editorials for Woman Magazine as well as an advertorial for Playtex lingerie for Red Magazine.

In January 2013, Gold became a People Tree Ambassador and shot the 2013 Spring/Summer Campaign in India. During which time she traveled around India with People Tree CEO Safia Minney and fashion designer Zandra Rhodes where they unveiled a new project to help rural Indian women. In February 2013, Gold participated in fair trade debate as a part of public relations event called "Fair Trade Fortnight" to bring awareness as well as debut People Tree's 2013 Spring/Summer Collection. When asked about her experiences, Gold said, “As a model, you turn up, model some clothes, and go home. The trip to India was a massive eye opener. I saw how the Fair Trade premiums are being used. I saw the kids going to schools, how happy they were, all the benefits they are getting, and the clean water.”

Currently, Gold is signed to Models 1 in London, Cathy Quinn Models in New York City, Unity Models in Munich, Modelwerk in Hamburg, Central Models in Lisbon, Francina in Barcelona, Stockholmsgruppen in Stockholm, MC2 in Tel Aviv, Shine Group in Johannesburg, Image Models in Athens, Team Modeller in Oslo, Next Models in Los Angeles, IMM Models in Brussels and Spot 6 Management in Toronto.

=== Acting ===
Gold's first acting role was playing a footballer's girlfriend named Scarlett on the show Dream Team. She was a regular during the 2005–2006 series. Gold was quoted as saying, "Well, initially I auditioned for the part of Chloe and they DT called me back a week later to read Scarlett, so I guess it was meant to be. I did an episode a couple of years ago when I was modelling, I've watched it on and off since then." In that same interview, Gold was asked if she would like to be a footballer's wife, and responded, "I would hate to be a kept woman, all that lunching and shopping seems like such hard work."

In 2008, Gold starred in the horror film Beyond the Rave as Lucretia. Also in 2008, she appeared in an arts film made by Angelo Valentino sponsored by Brockmans Gin which was shown in Cannes.

== Personal life ==
Lauren Anouschka R Gold was born on 9 January 1981 in Enfield, Middlesex, England. She is the second child of Warren Gold, the founder of Lord John of Carnaby Street, and Valerie (née Levey), a top fashion model in the late 1960s. She spent her early childhood in London, England with her older brother, James, and younger sister, Francesca. Gold also has three older half-siblings from her father's first marriage. Eventually, the family moved to Hertfordshire, England.

Growing up, Gold was in awe of her mother, a top model in the 1960s, whose pictures adorned their house. As early as age two, she was "obsessed with dressing up" and posing in front of the camera. At age 13, Gold's mother submitted her along with her siblings' pictures to modelling agencies. However, Gold was the only one who wanted to pursue modelling as a career. When she was a teenager, she attended an all-girls school, which was very strict about her grades and attendance. She was given time off school to pursue her modelling, with the proviso that she keep her grades up. Much of her initial modeling work was during her school holidays.

Throughout Gold's modelling career, her social life has been chronicled by the tabloids despite her keeping a relatively low profile. In her early career, she allegedly dated Westlife singer Mark Feehily in 1999. The pair kept a low profile due to his boy band status, with the exception of attending the Coyote Ugly premiere together. Several years after the breakup, Feehily came out of the closet. In 2000, the model was linked to her "Rock DJ" co-star Robbie Williams. Although there was much speculation of a romance with Williams, Gold has never admitted to a fling with him, but said at the time that she loved his body.

In April 2004, she was pictured out to lunch with footballer Freddie Ljungberg. In the summer of 2004, the pair were also spotted in Ljungberg's hometown of Halmstad, Sweden, as well as Båstad, Sweden, where Ljungberg and his family would spend their summers. Neither Gold or Ljungberg ever confirmed their relationship.

In 2006, tabloids speculated that Gold had dated Dream Team co-star Robert Kazinsky, after he published a series of love poems. By 2007, Gold was attending numerous events with her best friend Petra Nemcova. Despite Nemcova mentioning her friendship in her 2007 memoirs, Love Always, Petra: A Story of Courage and the Discovery of Life's Hidden Gifts, Gold has never commented on their friendship and remain close. That same year, there was also some speculation that she and Ziggy Lichman of Big Brother fame were once an item. Lichman's friends claim that the two enjoyed a two-year romance.

In November 2011, Lauren Gold married film director and producer Gabe Turner. In 2017, two years after her father's death, Gold along with her sister Francesca unveiled a plaque to commemorate the iconic Lord John shop at 43 Carnaby Street, London. In 2024, her home she shares with her husband and three children was featured in the Telegraph.

== Filmography ==
=== Films ===
Year	Work	Role	Notes
2008	Beyond the Rave	Lucretia	Film
2008	Out of the Dark	Lead role	Angelo Valentino short film for Brockmans Gin
2006	Dream Team	Scarlett Rose	Recurring role on Sky One soap opera
2004	Mr Firecul	Model 1	Short film starring David Ginola
2004	Double Zero	Flower	French film
200?	Dream Team	Model	Bit part
2000	"Rock DJ"	DJ	Robbie Williams music video
1998	"Crazy Love"	Girl in back seat	MJ Cole music video
1993	Unknown Roxette video	Extra	Roxette music video
