= Bournemouth School =

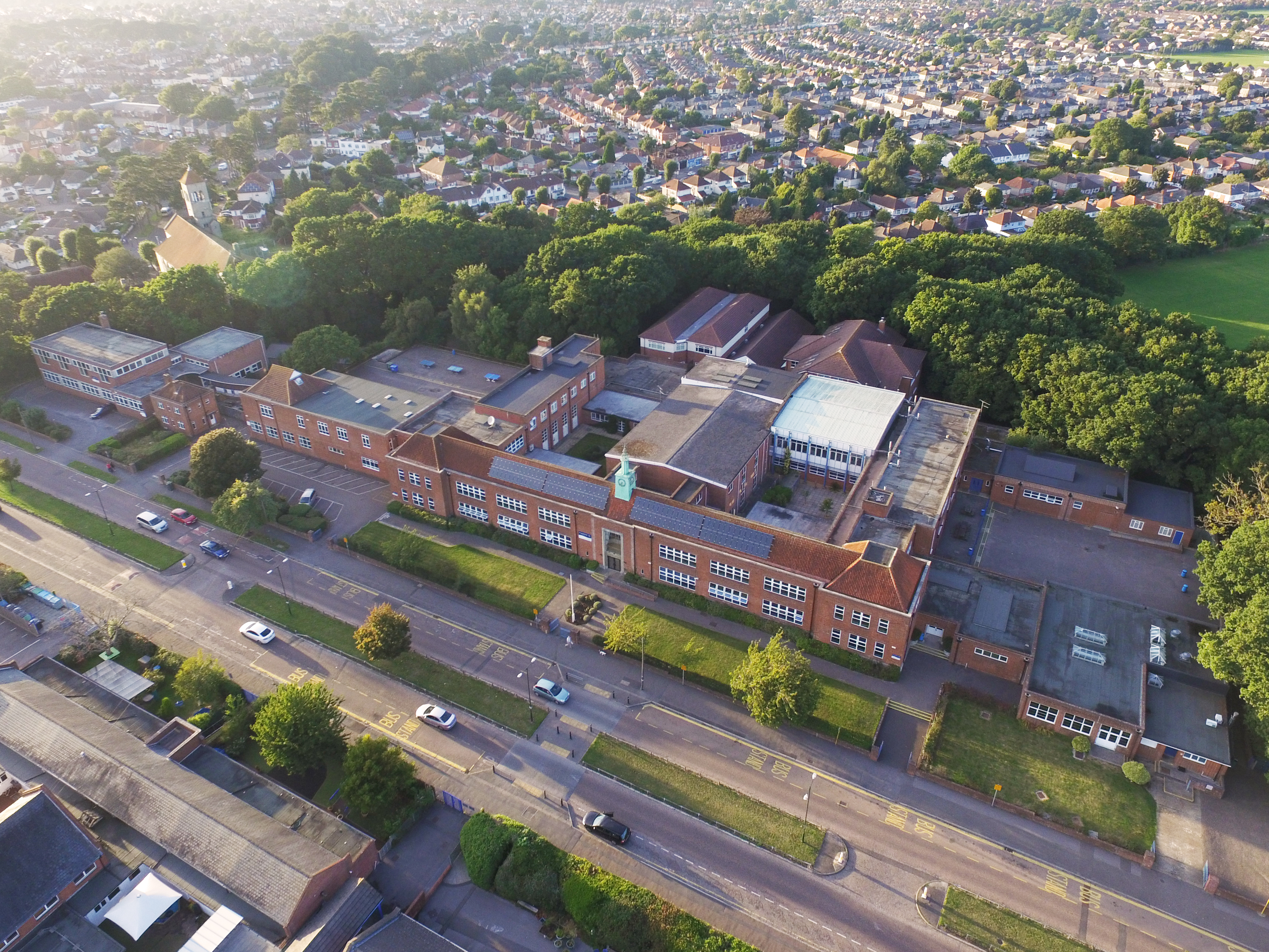
- School badge Aerial view of Bournemouth School. Note that this image was taken prior to the new building in the west of the site; this image displays the old senior playground (containing table tennis tables.)

Location
- East Way; Bournemouth, Dorset, BH8 9PY; England; 50°44′55″N 1°51′30″W

Information
- Type: 11–18 boys Grammar school; Academy
- Motto: Pulchritūdō et Salūbritas (Latin); Beauty and Health (English)
- Established: 1901
- Founder: E Fenwick
- Local authority: Bournemouth, Christchurch and Poole
- Department for Education URN: 137452 Tables
- Ofsted: Reports
- Head teacher: Mrs K Ateaque
- Staff: 72 full-time teachers, 32 auxiliary staff
- Age: 11 to 18
- Enrolment: 1,088 boys (lower school); 388 (Sixth form)
- Houses: Darwin; Elgar; Moore; Newton; Scott; Turner
- Colour
- Chairman of Governors: Mike Jones
- Website: Bournemouth School

Bournemouth School is an 11–18 boys grammar school, with a co-educational sixth form, located in Charminster, Bournemouth, Dorset, England, for children aged 11 to 18. The school was founded by E. Fenwick and opened on 22 January 1901, admitting 54 boys.

== History ==
=== Establishment ===
The school was founded by Dr. E. Fenwick and opened on 22 January 1901, admitting 54 boys. The 1906 syllabus included natural science, drawing, vocal music, drill, and gymnastics alongside history, geography, shorthand, and book keeping. During World War I, at least 651 young men who had been or were attached to the school served, and 98 of those died, while 95 were wounded. The roll of honour for the former students who died in service can be found inside the school's main entrance.

The original Victorian school buildings occupied a plot in Portchester Road. Adjacent to the main school was the purpose-built boarding house (pictured), in which the headmaster and a select number of boarders lived (at an annual fee of 12 guineas). As the number of students increased (200 in 1904, 306 in 1914, 479 in 1925), so too did the accommodation; the school encompassed a former Royal Victoria Hospital in 1925 for lower school classes, which was situated in the nearby Lowther Road. The two sites were known within the school as "Portchester" and "Lowther".

=== During World War II ===
The school moved to the present East Way site in 1939, formerly occupying buildings in Portchester Road and Lowther Road. From 1939 to 1945, the school housed over 600 members from Taunton's School, Southampton (then a grammar, now a sixth form college), due to evacuation from large cities. Among the Taunton staff was English master Horace King, later Lord Maybray-King, Speaker of the House of Commons. On 2 June 1940, about 800 French soldiers evacuated from Dunkirk were temporarily billeted in the school. Additional gas cookers were installed in the kitchen (now Languages Office) and staff were involved in preparing food and drink for the soldiers who occupied corridors and form rooms. One form room was used a temporary hospital for the more seriously wounded. Two days later, a further 300 arrived and remained in the school for about a week. On 19 June, after the French had been moved elsewhere, 400 or so British soldiers arrived, having been rescued from Cherbourg by the Royal Navy. It was agreed they would occupy the ground floor, leaving the senior school to carry out their summer examinations in the rooms above. Normal education resumed on 26 June.

In 1935, planning for new school buildings on the northern fringe of Charminster began. Various proposals were considered and the Council decided to allocate 10 acres for the new school in East Way. Building operations were begun early in 1937 and the Foundation Stones were laid on 25 May. They were erected from the designs and under the supervision of W. L. Clowes, Borough Engineer and Architect from 1936 onwards. They opened in 1939 and were first occupied by the boys from Portchester and Lowther and evacuees from Taunton's School in Southampton. Soon after, HORSA huts were erected to the north of the main buildings to house more classrooms. Further extensions to the buildings were made in subsequent years, with the canteen (previously above the Old Gym) built in 1957, a new physics laboratory built in 1958, Rooms 40 and 41 (now 9 and 10) in 1959, a new chemistry laboratory in 1961, a steel-framed structure above the single-storey north-eastern section (at the time of building, notorious for rocking in the wind) in the early 1990s and office space for Housemasters and admin staff later in 1992 (at the time the present House system was introduced). Larger scale building works include the Sixth Form Block in 1968, the Art & Technology blocks in the 1990s (replacing the HORSA huts), the Maths Blocks, which at the time of construction (between 2005 and 2007) was used for religious studies and mathematics but now the eight classrooms are exclusively purposed for the latter and the Sir David English Centre in 1999 (replacing the increasingly neglected, vandalised and subsequently demolished pavilions that were used for physical education and sports events).

=== Modern history, 1973– ===
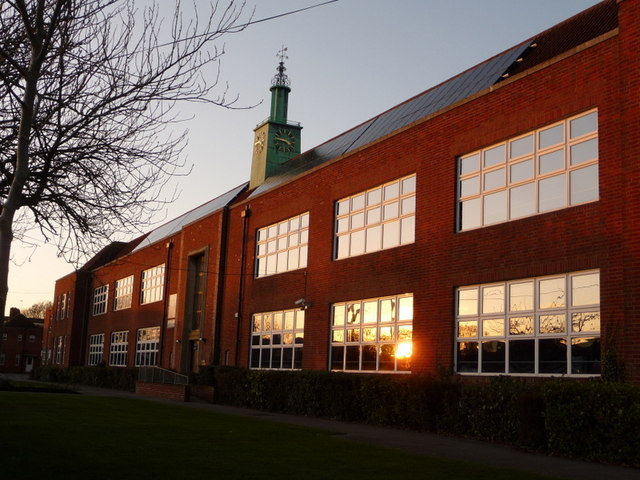
Bournemouth School in the evening sun

In 1973, the school hall burnt down. The new hall was opened in 1975.

The old sites in Portchester Road and Lowther Road were used by Portchester School from 1940 until 1989, when it moved to Harewood Avenue. The boarding house was demolished to make way for the Wessex Way, "Lowther" was demolished in the 1980s, the site being redeveloped into the new Malmesbury Park Primary School, and "Porchester" was redeveloped in 1990 into Fenwick Court, a housing estate. Nothing, therefore, of the pre-East Way buildings remains.

In mid-2021, the school started work on a new building, planned to accommodate the increasing number of pupils. It was completed in January 2023, with the headmaster Dorian Lewis opening it alongside former pupil Alex James. The three-storey building contains six new language classrooms alongside a new Modern Foreign Languages office, a canteen entitled Le Bistro, and a new sixth-form study centre.

In 2026, the school appointed their first female headteacher, Katie Ateaque.

== Head teachers ==
- 1901-1932 E. Fenwick
- 1932-1957 J. E. Parry
- 1957-1971 E. G. Bennett
- 1971-1982 H. P. Harper
- 1982-1987 J. A. B. Kelsall
- 1987-1996 A. F. P. Petrie
- 1996-2009 J. Granger
- 2009-2026 Dr. Dorian Lewis
- 2026-present Mrs K Ateaque

== Grammar school status ==
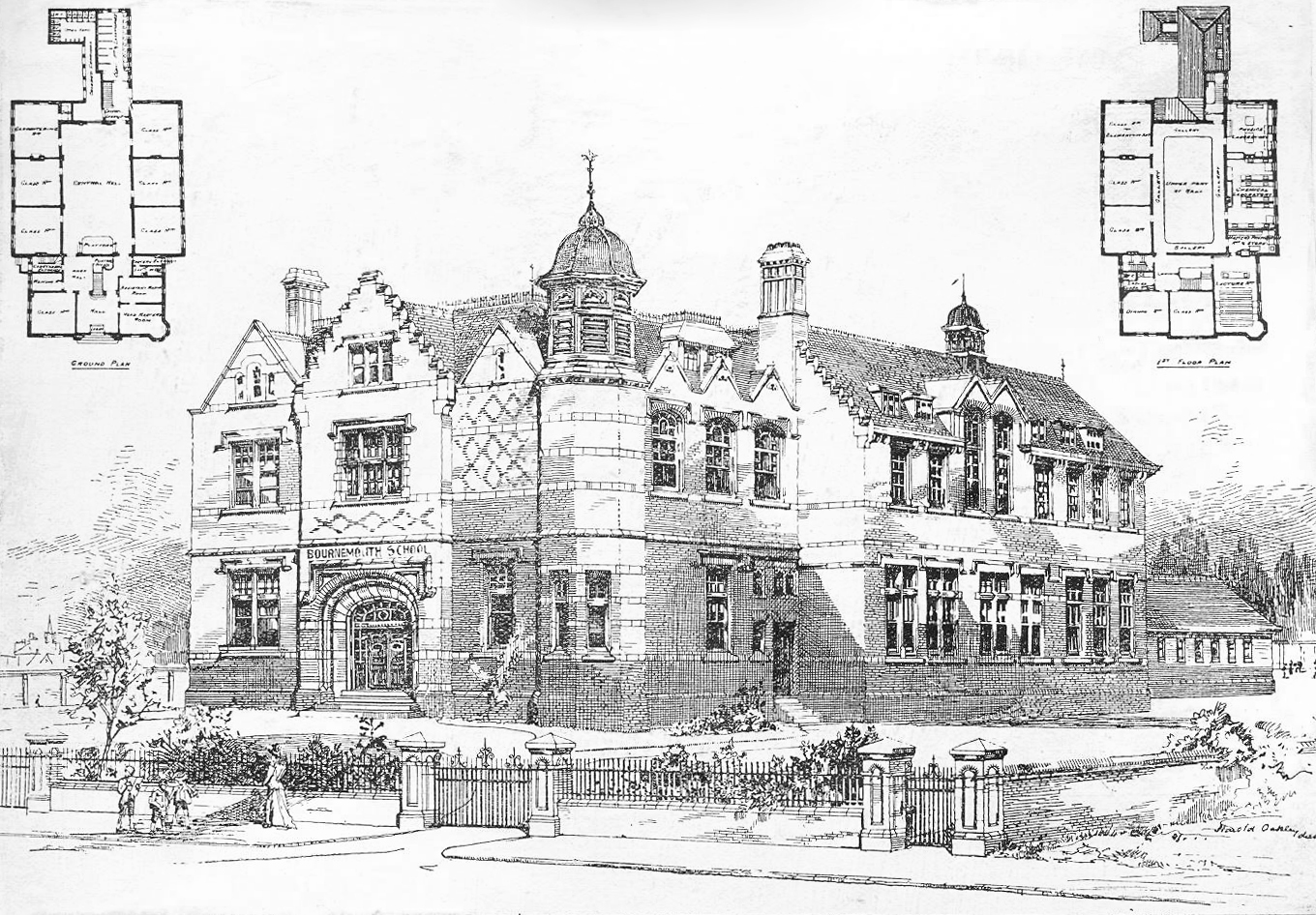
The architect's illustration of Bournemouth School's former (and original) buildings in Portchester Road

From the mid-1950s, 'grammar streams' were introduced in all Bournemouth secondary modern schools, and they effectively became bilateral schools. This idea was pioneered by the Chief Education Officer of the County Borough of Bournemouth from 1956 to 1972, Walter Smedley (who died aged 98 in June 2006) who was a former technical college lecturer, and allowed easier movement between the 'grammar streams' in these schools and the grammar schools. The system was nationally recognised, as it allowed greater flexibility, as is possible in comprehensive schools, but allowed academic standards to be maintained - people's ability was still recognised. Movement was down as well as up. The system was well supported by parents. The rate of pupils staying on at school in the sixth form was 50% higher than the national average in the 1960s. Selection to the grammar schools from 1965 was not assessed by a single exam, but continuously. In the late 1960s, Bournemouth's schools were producing GCE results 250% better than comprehensives in London's ILEA.

However, in 1969, Edward Short, the Labour education secretary, condemned Bournemouth's education system. Once Smedley left in 1972, the bilateral schools later became comprehensives. The last school of this type was Oakmead College of Technology. Entrance exams for the grammar schools were also reintroduced. Bournemouth LEA still gets very good exam results, especially at A level. Dorset County Council took over from 1974 to 1997.

In 2011, Bournemouth School ceased to hold its "selective grammar school" status, as it became an academy. The school kept its original name as well as its uniform and entrance examination through the change, but is now directly funded and overseen by the government rather than a local education authority.

== Affiliations ==
The school shares playing fields with Bournemouth School for Girls and occasionally co-operates with them in theatre productions.

All Bournemouth School students use the Sir David English Sports Centre for physical education lessons. It has an indoor sports hall, four tennis and netball courts and three artificial turf football pitches.

The annual sports day, acting as the climax of the House Competition, takes place at the King's Park athletics stadium.

== Girls in the sixth form ==
Bournemouth School accepted 15 female applicants to the sixth form for the first time in September 2012.

== Notable former pupils ==
- Mark Austin, journalist and newscaster, current presenter of The News Hour with Mark Austin on Sky News
- Christian Bale, actor, left at age 16
- Aaron Bastani, writer and founder of Novara Media
- Colin Boreham, competed in the decathlon in the 1984 Summer Olympics, he had the British high jump record in 1974, of 6ft 11, which lasted one year
- Morley Bury, painter and artist
- Dennis Curry, geologist, president from 1963 to 1965 of the Geologists' Association, grandson of Henry Curry (founder of Currys)
- Sir David English, journalist and editor of the Daily Mail from 1971 to 1992
- Charlie Ewels, professional rugby union player, Bath Rugby
- Sir Brian Follett, chairman of the Training and Development Agency for Schools since 2003, and vice-chancellor of the University of Warwick from 1993 to 2001
- Charles Gray, actor
- Sir P. J. Grigg, Secretary of State for War, 1942-1945
- Tim Hayward, writer, broadcaster from 1976 to 1981
- Benny Hill, comedian, writer
- James Inverne, artist manager and former editor of Gramophone; key in uncovering the Joyce Hatto fraud
- Alex James, bass player and occasional vocalist of band Blur
- Gareth Malone, choirmaster and broadcaster
- Dick Moore, cricketer
- Henry Moss (Tiskovitz), fashion entrepreneur; set up Lady Jane Boutique in Carnaby Street
- Richard Palmer-James, co-founder of band Supertramp
- Miles Reid, algebraic geometer
- Michael Roberts (1902-1948), poet, writer, broadcaster and teacher
- Ivan Rogers, former senior British civil servant
- John Wetton, English singer, bassist and songwriter.
- Tom Wise, former UKIP and Independent MEP jailed for fraud
