= Carnival of Light =

- Poster for the Million Volt Light and Sound Rave, 1967 (designed by Bob Gill)

Composition by the Beatles
- Recorded: 5 January 1967
- Studio: EMI, London
- Genre: Avant-garde; musique concrète
- Length: 13:48
- Producer: George Martin

"Carnival of Light", originally known as "Untitled", is an unreleased avant-garde recording by the English rock band the Beatles. It was commissioned for the Million Volt Light and Sound Rave, an event held at the Roundhouse in London on 28 January and 4 February 1967. Recorded during a session for the song "Penny Lane", "Carnival of Light" is nearly 14 minutes long and contains distorted, echo-laden sounds of percussion, keyboards, guitar and vocals. Its creation was initiated by Paul McCartney's interest in the London avant-garde scene and through his connection with the design firm Binder, Edwards & Vaughan (often called BEV, and headed by the partners Doug Binder, Dudley Edwards and David Vaughan).

Since the event, "Carnival of Light" has rarely been heard, and does not circulate on bootlegs. For McCartney, the piece came to hold significance in his efforts to be recognised as the first Beatle to fully engage with the avant-garde, over a year before John Lennon recorded "Revolution 9". In 1996, McCartney tried to release the track on the Beatles' Anthology 2 compilation, but its inclusion was vetoed by his former bandmates. McCartney confirmed that he still had the tape in 2008. As of 2026, he is still considering releasing it.

== Background ==
With their August 1966 album Revolver, the Beatles broke new ground in pop by departing from the genre's conventional notions of compositional form, instrumentation and engineering; in musicologist Walter Everett's description, it was also "an innovative example of electronic music". Around December, Vaughan painted a psychedelic design on a piano owned by Paul McCartney. When delivering the piano to McCartney's home in St John's Wood, he asked McCartney to contribute a musical piece for The Million Volt Light and Sound Rave. To Vaughan's surprise, McCartney agreed. This is the story offered in Barry Miles' 1997 biography Paul McCartney: Many Years from Now. Alternatively, McCartney later told music journalist Mark Ellen that it was Miles who asked him to contribute to the event, while author Howard Sounes said that Dudley Edwards of BEV asked McCartney for a musical contribution from the Beatles and received a tape of "Carnival of Light" soon afterwards.

The Million Volt Light and Sound Rave (sometimes referred to as the "Carnival of Light Rave") was an art festival organised by BEV as a showcase for electronic music and light shows. It was held at the Roundhouse Theatre in Chalk Farm, north London. Posters for the event promised "music composed by Paul McCartney and Unit Delta Plus". The latter was an electronic music group whose members included composers Delia Derbyshire and Brian Hodgson from the BBC Radiophonic Workshop and synthesizer pioneer Peter Zinovieff. (Note: McCartney also considered collaborating on a Radiophonic version of "Yesterday" with Derbyshire. Responding to this suggestion, Hodgson said: "I would have thought Delia would have done it, quite frankly. So many rumours go around, so many legends. Chance meetings turn into long associations that didn't happen." Derbyshire commented that her association with McCartney did not last beyond their brief meeting in 1966.) In preparation for the event, Dudley Edwards took McCartney to meet Zinovieff at the latter's house in Putney in south-west London. There, Zinovieff played them an experimental composition "at such intense decibel frequencies", according to Edwards, "that many parts of my anatomy (including internal organs) began to perform an involuntary dance. I can only describe it as 'ecstatic twitching'."

== Recording ==
I said "all I want you to do is just wander around all the stuff, bang it, shout, play it, it doesn't need to make any sense. Hit a drum, then wander onto the piano, hit a few notes and just wander around."

— Paul McCartney recalling his suggestions for "Carnival of Light"

The Beatles recorded the new piece for BEV on 5 January 1967, early in the sessions for the album that became Sgt. Pepper's Lonely Hearts Club Band. They started the work after completing overdubs on the song "Penny Lane". All four Beatles were present, as was George Martin, their producer. With reference to McCartney's credit on the poster for the rave, author Steve Turner says that as a "musical freak-out" by the four Beatles, "Carnival of Light" "wasn't so much 'composed' by Paul as initiated by him".

McCartney remembered initiating the recording by saying to his bandmates: "this is a bit indulgent but would you mind giving me 10 minutes? I've been asked to do this thing. All I want you to do is just wander round all of the stuff and bang it, shout, play it." He said that the work was uncategorisable as a piece of music, but identified it as avant-garde and within the "Stockhausen/John Cage bracket". According to Beatles biographer Ian MacDonald, McCartney also intended to capture the spirit of AMM, a London-based experimental jazz group whose work he knew through Miles, and their aesthetic similarly informed the Beatles' recording of "A Day in the Life" later in January. (Note: The Beatles also incorporated avant-garde experimentation in the collage inserted in the Sgt. Pepper LP's run-out groove.)

"Carnival of Light" has no lyrics, although McCartney and John Lennon's voices are heard on the track. The band first created a basic track of drums and organ recorded at a fast speed, which made them sound deeper in pitch and slower in tempo. A large amount of reverb was applied to the instruments and to Lennon and McCartney's vocals. The two also recorded Native American war cries, whistling, close-miked gasping, genuine coughing and fragments of studio conversation. Other overdubs to the song include bursts of guitar feedback, organ, piano and electronic feedback with Lennon shouting "Electricity!" At one point, McCartney plays a version of "Fixing a Hole" on piano.

"The Return of the Son of Monster Magnet" by the Mothers of Invention
Barry Miles – a 1960s London underground figure and one of the few people to have heard "Carnival of Light" – likened the track to "The Return of the Son of Monster Magnet" (1966).

Miles suggests that the piece "most resembles 'The Return of the Son of Monster Magnet'", composed by Frank Zappa, from the Mothers of Invention's Freak Out!, an album that he had given to McCartney in 1966 and which resounded with the latter's initial ideas for Sgt. Pepper. Miles continues: "except there is no rhythm and the music here is more fragmented, abstract and serious ... [A] beat is sometimes established for a few bars by the percussion or a rhythmic pounding on the piano. There is no melody, though snatches of a tune sometimes threaten to break through." Beatles historian Mark Lewisohn was granted access to the completed recording of "Carnival of Light" while compiling his 1988 book The Complete Beatles Recording Sessions. He outlined the contents of the four-track tape:

- Track one: "distorted, hypnotic drum and organ sounds"
- Track two: "a distorted lead guitar"
- Track three: "the sounds of a church organ, various effects (water gargling was one) and voices ... perhaps most intimidating of all, John and Paul screaming dementedly and bawling aloud random phrases like 'Barcelona!' and 'Are you alright?'"
- Track four: "various indescribable sound effects with heaps of echo and manic tambourine"

The piece concludes with McCartney asking the studio engineer in an echo-soaked voice, "Can we hear it back now?" Lewisohn wrote that a rough mono mix was given to Vaughan, while Miles stated that the mixdown had "full stereo separation". After completing the session, according to engineer Geoff Emerick, Martin said: "This is ridiculous. We've got to get our teeth into something constructive." Emerick wrote that Lennon's "Barcelona" yell and other "bits and pieces" from the "Carnival of Light" session were later recycled for "Revolution 9", a sound collage Lennon recorded with Yoko Ono in June 1968.

== Premiere ==
"Carnival of Light" received its only public airing at the Million Volt Light and Sound Rave. None of the Beatles were at the rave. Instead, on 28 January, McCartney and George Harrison attended a Four Tops concert at the Royal Albert Hall. McCartney was angry with the organisers when he learned that the tape had been allowed to play on past the agreed point, thereby giving the crowd a preview of "Fixing a Hole". Edwards said this was not intentional, but that he and Doug Binder had been busy with the rave's light show. The piece was played several times during the two evenings.

In Hodgson's recollection, "Carnival of Light" was "all rather a mess ... There seemed to be no coherence to what was on the tape." According to McCartney biographer Ian Peel, others who heard the recording were "comprehensively underwhelmed". Vaughan recalled: "So all the music was live, apart from the f***ing [sic] tapes that Paul McCartney did. You know, where he thought he'd do something without words, that was very mysterious ... I don't think it was up to much." Daevid Allen of Soft Machine told Peel: "I dimly remember the sound collage because it was not particularly memorable. He had obviously improved a bit by the time Sgt. Pepper was made."

== Aftermath and omission from Anthology 2 ==
I was getting interested in avant garde things ... I never got known for being that way because John later superseded me, "Oh, it must have been John who was the Stockhausen freak." In actual fact it wasn't, it was me and my London crowd – Robert Fraser, Miles of IT magazine ... John Dunbar, Peter Asher, the Indica crowd.

— McCartney to Mark Lewisohn

Since 1967, "Carnival of Light" has only been heard by "Abbey Road insiders", according to author Mark Brend, and has not circulated on bootlegs. Notwithstanding the Beatles' McCartney-led experimentation during the Sgt. Pepper period, it was Lennon who came to be identified as the band's revolutionary avant-gardist through "Revolution 9" and other collaborations with Ono, including their 1968 album Two Virgins. Harrison also became publicly associated with avant-garde experimentalism, with his late-1960s solo albums Wonderwall Music and Electronic Sound, as did Ringo Starr, through his championing of Apple artist John Tavener; by comparison, according to music critic Richie Unterberger, McCartney retained "the straightest public image of the four". When asked about "Carnival of Light" in his interview for Lewisohn's 1988 book, McCartney likened the track to Harrison's forays into Indian music with the Beatles, and said he had recently renewed his interest in such experimental work.

In 1996, McCartney attempted to include "Carnival of Light" on the Beatles' compilation album Anthology 2, but was vetoed by Harrison, Starr and Ono (as Lennon's widow) on the grounds that the track was never intended for a Beatles release. Later, McCartney recalled that "The guys didn't like the idea, like 'this is rubbish'". He said that Harrison did not enjoy the avant-garde ("as George would say, 'avant-garde a clue'"). (Note: In his liner notes for the 1996 reissue of Electronic Sound, Harrison wrote dismissively: "It could be called avant-garde. But a more apt description would be (in the words of my old friend Alvin [Lee]) 'Avant-garde a clue'!") George Martin, who helped evaluate all the Beatles' recordings for inclusion on the Anthology CDs, also considered "Carnival of Light" unworthy of release. McCartney was motivated to include the track out of a wish to be recognised as the first Beatle to embrace avant-garde music, almost eighteen months before Lennon – who used to deride avant-garde as "French for bullshit" – recorded "Revolution 9". (Note: The same motivation had informed McCartney's interviews since 1986, including those for the Anthology project; an essay he commissioned for the programme distributed free during his 1989–90 world tour; and particularly his authorised biography with Miles, Many Years from Now. The latter includes 57 pages devoted to establishing McCartney's involvement with the 1960s London avant-garde scene, in addition to commentary on "Carnival of Light".)

Lewisohn assisted the Beatles in compiling the Anthology project. He said he advocated for the track to be included on Anthology 2, but: "It certainly didn't get beyond George, I'm not sure it got beyond Ringo or Yoko either. It was something that was going to, potentially, spotlight only Paul in a good way and I don't know that was something they collectively wanted." One of the few others to have heard "Carnival of Light", Barry Miles dismissed it as "really dreadful". He also said: "It doesn't bear being released. It's just masses of echo ... It was the same thing that everybody was doing at home." In Ian MacDonald's opinion, unlike the sensitivity AMM brought to their work, "the Beatles merely bashed about at the same time, overdubbing without much thought, and relying on the Instant Art effects of tape-echo to produce something suitably 'far out'."

== Further release speculation ==
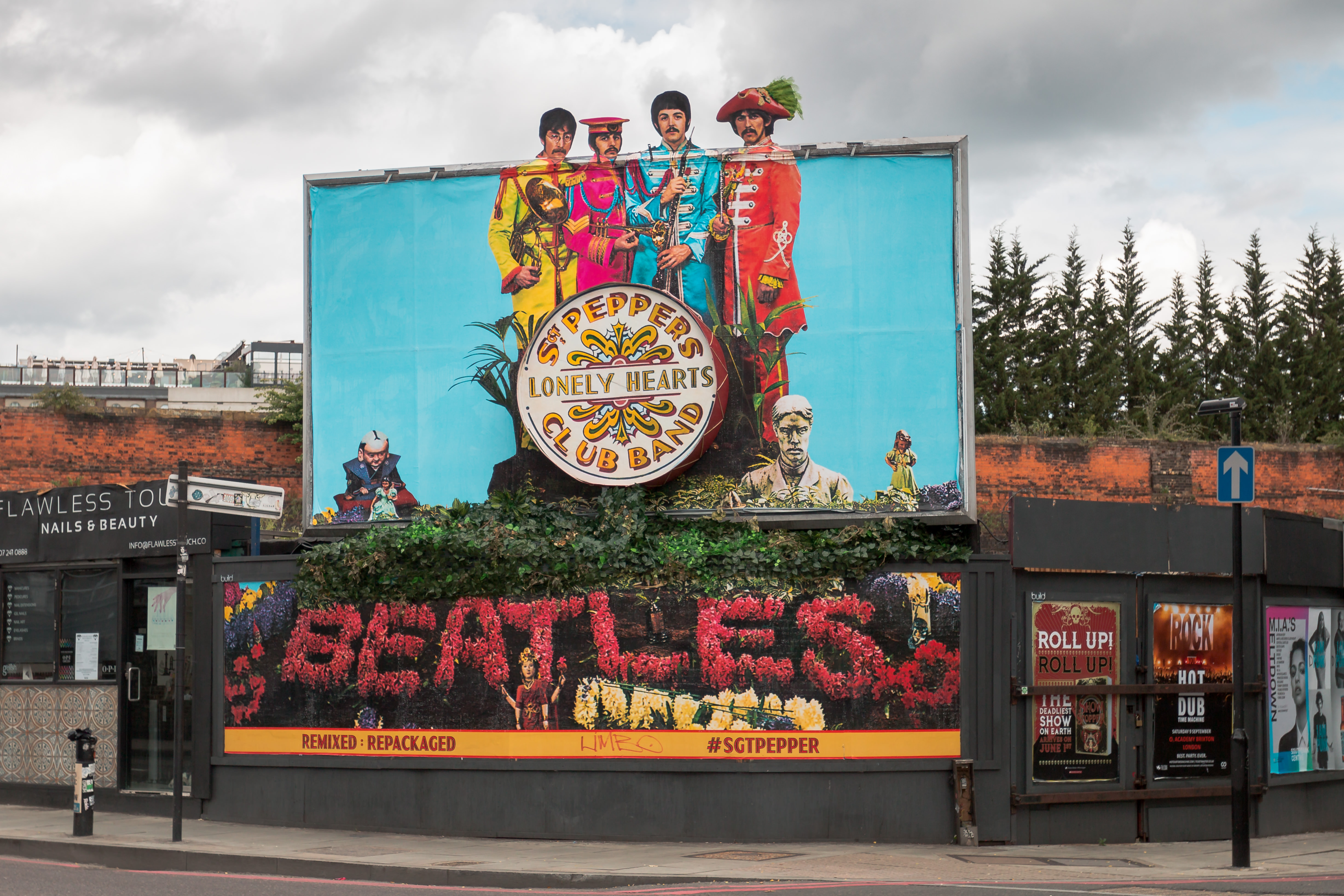
Sgt. Pepper 50th anniversary billboard, London, 2017. Despite the hopes of some fans, the track was not included on the reissued album.

In a 2001 interview with Ellen, reproduced on the Rocking Vicar website the following April, McCartney said he was working on a photo collage film of the Beatles that was similar to another film he had created, Grateful Dead – A Photo Film (1995). He said he was planning to use "Carnival of Light" in the soundtrack. As of 2006, this project had yet to be seen and no part of the track had surfaced. During a 2004 interview, McCartney confirmed he still owned the master tapes and that "the time has come for it to get its moment. I like it because it's the Beatles free, going off-piste." He would require the consent of Starr, Ono, and Harrison's widow Olivia Harrison to release the track.

Music journalist Michael Gallucci has described "Carnival of Light" as "the holy grail of lost Beatles recordings". Ian Peel devotes a full chapter to the track in his 2002 book The Unknown Paul McCartney: McCartney and the Avant-Garde. In his comments to Peel, David Vaughan said of the importance of this avant-garde piece to McCartney: "the idea of course was that he did it before John [Lennon]. They were a pain in the arse, the pair of them ... In fact they all were. They were always trying to upstage each other. I mean, who gives a f*** [sic] who was first for that one, do you know what I mean?"

In a 2016 interview, McCartney stated that he was toying with the idea of releasing previously unissued Beatles recording takes, including "Carnival of Light". Contrary to fans' expectations, it did not appear as a bonus track on any of the expanded 50th anniversary editions of Sgt. Pepper's Lonely Hearts Club Band released the following year. Giles Martin, who oversaw a new stereo remix of Sgt. Pepper for the 50th anniversary releases, commented that the track was considered for inclusion, but "it wasn't really part of Pepper ... It's a very different thing", adding that "'Carnival of Light' was never meant to be a record, in fact. It's one of those things that fans talk about ... But it was meant for the Roundhouse." Martin nonetheless expressed a hope to "do something interesting" with the track in the future. Following the long-awaited release of "Now and Then" in 2023, many Beatles fans have called for "Carnival of Light" to get its own release. "Carnival of Light" was excluded once again from Anthology 4 in 2025.

== Influence ==
In 2026, the British absurdist comedy group Consignia performed an interpretation of Carnival of Light during the Edinburgh Festival Fringe.

== Personnel ==
According to Kenneth Womack:

- John Lennon – vocals, organ, tape effects
- Paul McCartney – vocals, piano, tape effects
- George Harrison – vocals, guitar, tape effects
- Ringo Starr – tambourine, tape effects
