= Henry Moss =

- Born: Henry Tiskovitz; 1933 (age 92–93); London, England
- Occupation: Businessman
- Years active: 1954–present
- Known for: Carnaby Street; Lady Jane Boutique
- Spouse: Lilian Silverman
- Children: 2, including Danny Ben-Moshe

Henry Moss (born October 1933) is a British clothing and food entrepreneur, notable for women's fashion and associated with the emergence of London's Carnaby Street as a world centre of fashion in the Swinging Sixties.

== Personal life ==
Henry Moss, born Henry Tiskovitz, in October 1933 at Mother Levy's Nursing Home, Tower Hamlets, East London. The family later relocated to Dorset, eventually settling in Winton, where Moss was educated at Bournemouth School. In 1962 Moss married Lilian Moss (née Silverman), subject of the BBC documentary, My Mother's Lost Children. The couple settled in Hampstead Garden Suburb, North London. They have a son and daughter; Daniel, holder of the Centenary Medal, was associate professor at Deakin University and is a documentary maker; Ira who set up and runs the charity All Dogs Matter.

== Work ==
Moss's first businesses, Mann & Moss (Pay as you wear) Ltd & Mann & Moss (Camden) Ltd, began in 1954 at age 21 with his uncle, Percy Mann, supplying goods to homes around London, providing credit for lower income families. Around 1960 Moss established his first fashion businesses retailing ladies and children's clothes; Camden Fashions at 67a Camden High Street & Children's Fashion Centre at 80 Camden High Street, London. Around 1965 Moss was inspired to move to Carnaby Street by his neighbours, the Gold brothers, who had opened their Lord John store there.

== Carnaby Street ==
Moss and Harry Fox opened Lady Jane, the first ladies boutique, at 29 Carnaby Street in April 1966 In one of London's most famous publicity stunts, Moss and Fox had models Diane James and Gina Baker dressing in the window, drawing huge crowds and landing him in trouble with the police resulting in an appearance at Great Marlborough Street Court and a fine of £2.00, the brainchild of then PR man Michael Freedland. Other publicity stunts included trousers at Claridges. In 1967 Fox stood for election to the Greater London Council as an 'Independent Carnaby Street' candidate for Westminster and the City of London. See through clothing and paint on bras were all part of the promotion and image of the time.

Cat Stevens worked in the boutique for a short time and customers included Martha & the Vandellas, Nancy Sinatra, Mia Farrow, Julia Foster, Joan Collins and her then husband Anthony Newley. Regular patrons included Michael Crawford, Georgie Fame and actress Sylva Koscina. Claudia Cardinale was introduced to the boutique by designer Pierre Cardin. An interview with actress Jayne Mansfield further raised Lady Jane's profile but by 1968 Moss and Fox had parted company. In 1966 Moss rented 15 Foubert's Place to I Was Lord Kitchener's Valet, establishing their first shop in the Carnaby Street area. Later, around 1968–69 Moss entered into a joint venture with them, opening a shop on Piccadilly Circus.

In spring 1968 Henry Moss launched Sweet Fanny Adams, located at 47A Carnaby Street. The shop retailed ladies underwear and swimming costumes as well as acting as a centre for the burgeoning demand for nylon tights which supplanted stockings as nylon technology improved.

Later in 1968 Moss opened Pussy Galore, named after Honor Blackman's character in the James Bond film Goldfinger. The shop was located at 5–7 Carnaby Street. Moss's white crocheted dress creation, made from a tablecloth, was included in the 2006 V&A 'Sixties Fashion' exhibition. Regular visitors included Francoise Pascal. After winning 'best legs in London' competition Tamasin Day-Lewis was awarded £100 to spend in Pussy Galore.

Moss set up The London Mob in 1968, a clothing production company. This allowed him to both retail and wholesale his creations. Design was based at Stephen House, 52–55 Carnaby Street with the main showroom at 63 Great Portland Street. Moss served a writ on Sammy Davies Jr in 1968 whilst on stage at the London Palladium, in Golden Boy. Sammy Davies had failed to pay for the show clothes. In 1968 Moss ventured to USA, opening the first contemporary pop-up shop on Kings Highway in Brooklyn for two days.

== Post Carnaby Street ==
Carnaby Street had influenced fashion across the world but by the mid-1970s Carnaby Street came into decline as fashion outlets moved into King's Road and Kensington High Street.

Travelling to Turkey as part of a British export trade initiative in early 1974 to promote The London Mob, Moss was Invited to a night club in Istanbul, his credit cards were stolen, then served with an exorbitant bill and held to ransom by the owners. Negotiating his release he contacted the Turkish police who took Moss back to the night club where they administered rough justice. Back at his hotel Moss was astounded to see everyone seemed to know him unaware the incident had become front-page news. Presenting himself in the foyer, Turkish Airlines Captain Atilla Celebi offered Moss the opportunity to fly out of Turkey a day earlier than planned. To Moss's amazement the next day he found the flight he would have taken, Turkish Airlines Flight 981, had crashed. In an ironic twist it transpired that Captain Celebi's wife was already a customer of The London Mob.

In the late 1970s Moss established the company Henry Moss of London Ltd, a fashion export business based at 25 Margaret Street, W1. In 1979 Moss contested a VAT export procedure which led to a change in VAT protocol after appealing a VAT tribunal, setting the ruling as a frequently quoted Court of Appeal case. In a 1980 Court of Appeal ruling adjudicated by Lord Denning, Moss eventually lost his case on a technicality.

Around mid 1980s Moss moved into the catering sector creating Munchkin's a themed restaurant he currently owns and operates.

In 2010 the London College of Fashion celebrated 50 years of Fashion & Music in Carnaby Street 1960–2010, inviting the surviving entrepreneurs that made it happen.

In 2011 Danny Ben-Moshe produced a documentary about Carnaby Street in its heyday called 'Carnaby Street Undressed' featuring interviews with Roger Daltrey of The Who, Robert Orbach of I Was Lord Kitchener's Valet, Warren Gold of Lord John & Henry Moss

In 2019 Harry Fox and Moss were both awarded a green plaque by Westminster City Council for their contribution to fashion, specifically Lady Jane as the first iconic ladies fashion boutique of Carnaby Street.
