= David Vaughan (artist) =

British artist

David Vaughan (8 May 1944 – 4 December 2003) was a British psychedelic artist who formed the design team Binder, Edwards & Vaughan (BEV), and the father of actress Sadie Frost. He obtained commissions for his psychedelic painted furniture from Princess Margaret, did work for the Beatles in the early 1960s, worked for Expo 67 and Lord John in Carnaby Street, while photographer David Bailey used his work for a series of posters. He was also involved with two events at the Chalk Farm Roundhouse; Jimi Hendrix appeared at one of them on 22 February 1967.

== Early life and education ==
Vaughan was born in Manchester, England, the son of two factory workers. He studied art in Ashton-under-Lyne and Bradford, where Douglas Binder and Dudley Edwards were fellow students, before moving to London to take up the offer of a place at the Slade School of Fine Art.

== Career ==
On leaving art school, he set up a very successful design team, inviting Binder and Edwards from Bradford to join him to form BEV (the name derived from the first letters of their surnames). For several years during the mid-1960s they produced customised cars and furniture. Vaughan was invited to America by Macy's department store to demonstrate his techniques, as Artist in Residence. He was also approached by the chairman of Pan Am who wanted some jets customising. He travelled across the US in his customised AC Cobra promoting Swinging London.

On returning to Britain, after being commissioned by Paul McCartney to paint a piano in psychedelic colours, he asked the Beatle if he was interested in participating in The Million Volt Light and Sound Rave planned for 28 January 1967. Carnival of Light, an avant-garde recording yet to be commercially published, was recorded by the Beatles on 5 January and played once for the happening.

He also accepted a commission to paint a giant psychedelic mural on the exterior three-storey-high wall of a building on Carnaby Street that housed the Lord John boutique. While he was working from a cradle on the giant mural, a visitor let one of the securing ropes go, plunging the cradle three storeys, and landing on the ground with Vaughan trapped under the visitor. He appeared unhurt, but suffered an undiagnosed head injury. Instead of taking him to hospital to be examined, his friends gave him some LSD to "calm him down", which in fact flipped his mind. He then spent three years as a down and out, suffering from manic depression, which affected him for the rest of his life.

He eventually got his life back on track with a new wife, to whom he was married for over 30 years. He rejected the "London scene" and moved back to Manchester, where he became the country's most prolific mural artist, during the 1970s and early 1980s. He formed the mural group "Noah's Ark", which as well as producing mural art for the under-privileged in youth clubs, schools, churches and hospitals (he painted the first British hospital mural at the Duchess of York's Hospital for Babies in Manchester), offered young and disadvantaged people the opportunity to study mural painting firsthand.

During the 1970s, he employed a variety of young people to assist and learn how to produce a mural, and he also completed many private commissions, re-creating on a smaller scale some of the success he achieved in the 1960s. These included customized shops – Barratts music shop on Oxford Road, Manchester, became a mecca for art/music students who visited to see the huge portraits of jazz and blues musicians adorning the walls, which were just a part of the complete makeover Vaughan gave the premises in 1974. In the mid-1980s, he started to produce his "Victims" series of paintings, which depicted some of the horrors of modern society, and which were found to be quite controversial at the time. In his later career he returned to painting portraits – John Lennon, Bob Dylan, Gallagher and also pencil portraits of David Beckham and Jude Law.

Vaughan died on 4 December 2003, while awaiting a liver transplant. He was 59 years old.

== Personal life ==
His daughter Sadie Frost wrote of "a bohemian, traveller-like childhood. We lived on a bus which we drove from Belsize Park to Morocco." She said that Vaughan was "schizophrenic at a time when nobody really talked about mental health".

Vaughan was married three times. Vaughan was survived by his third wife, Anne. Vaughan had two sons in his first marriage, two daughters in his second marriage, including actress Sadie Frost, and three sons in his third marriage, all whom survive him.
