= Pylones =

French gift shop chain

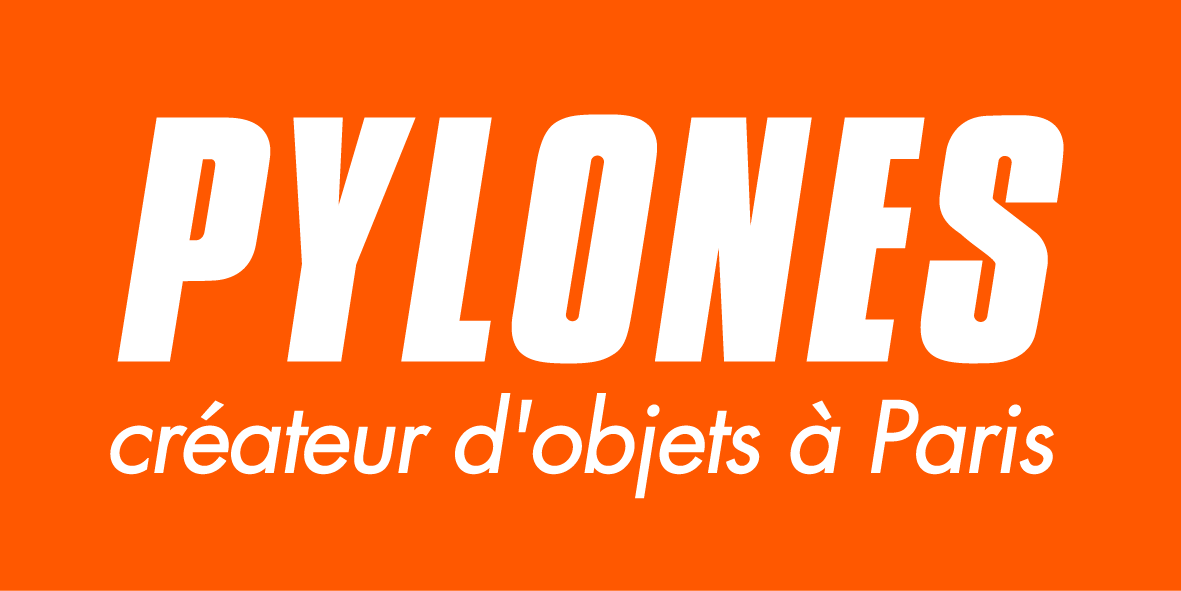
- Founded: 1985
- Founder: Jacques Guillemet and Lena Guillemet
- Number of locations: 110
- Website: Official website

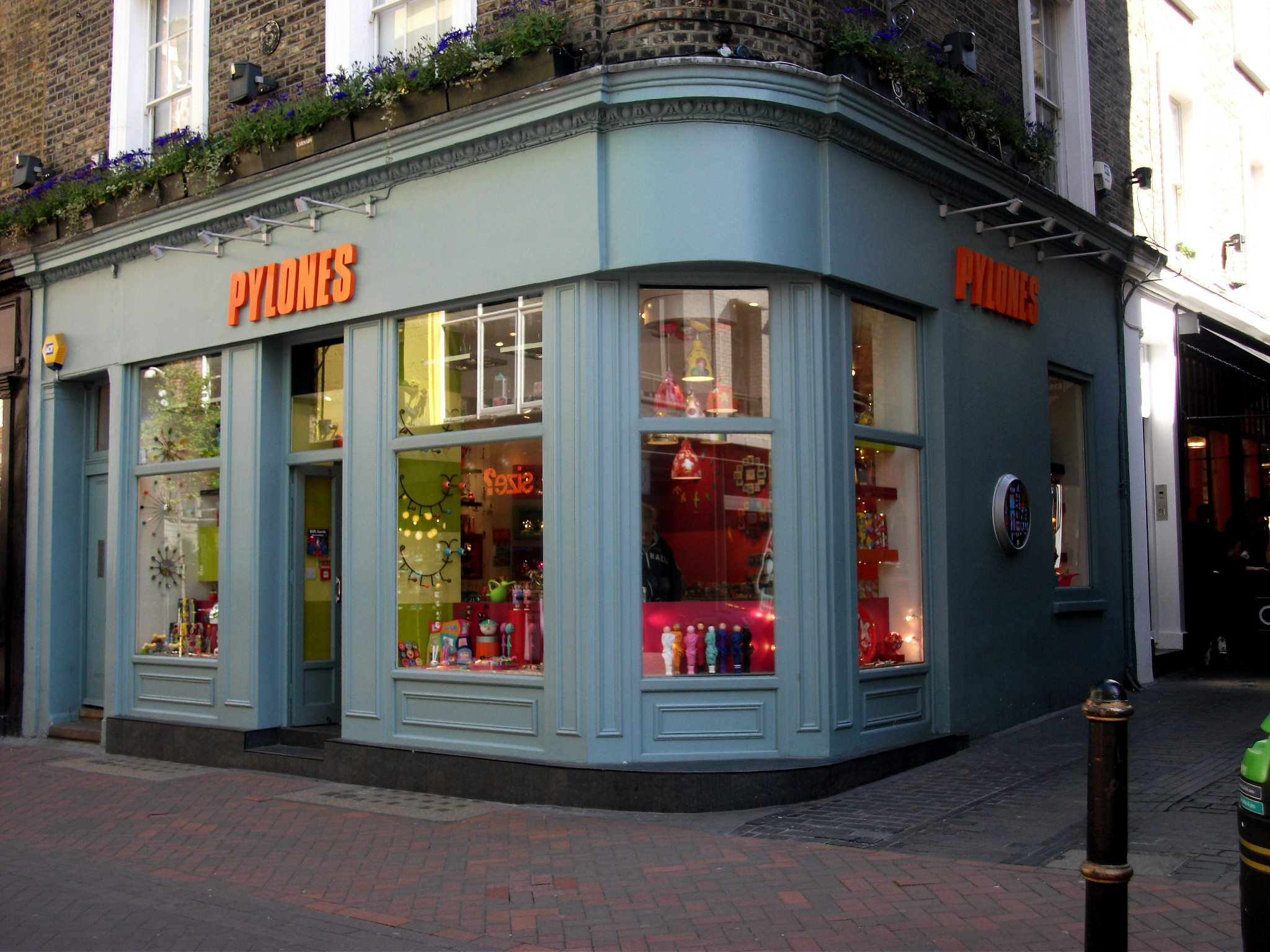
Pylones, Carnaby Street, London

Pylones is a French gift shop chain.

== Overview ==
Pylones was founded in Paris in 1985, by Jacques Guillemet and Lena Guillemet.

They have 110 shops in 20 countries in Europe, the Middle East, South America, Asia and South Africa.

The New York Times called it "On the Corner of Cute, Between Stupid and Clever".
