= Morley Bury =

British painter

- Born: John Morley Bury; 1919; Bournemouth, UK
- Died: 1999
- Education: Reading University
- Known for: Painting, portraits and landscapes
- Movement: Modern
- Spouse: Shirley Bury

John Morley Bury (1919-1999) was a British painter.

== Early life ==
John Morley Bury was born in Bournemouth in 1919 and grew up in the village of Holdenhurst. Bury attended Bournemouth School and later Bournemouth Municipal College Art (1937–9) then Reading University (1939–40).

Bury spent six years in the British Army, with a tank regiment in the Western Desert, then as a prisoner of war in Italy and Germany, being freed by Russian troops and repatriated.

== Post-war painting career ==
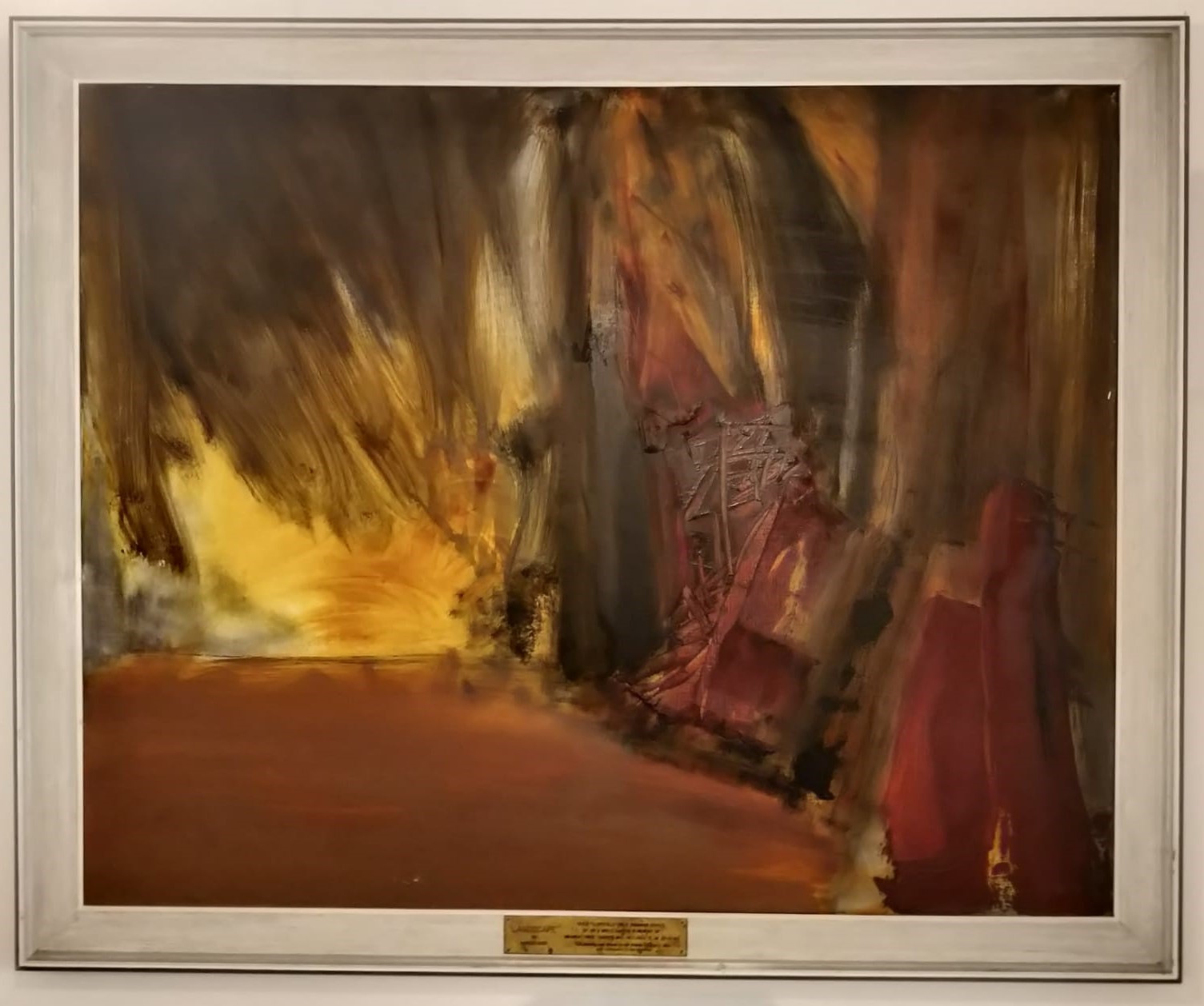
Landscape, 1963

After the war Bury returned to Reading University, where he met his wife, art historian Shirley Bury, also attending Regent Street Polytechnic and Goldsmiths’ College. He attended evening classes in textiles at Central School of Arts and Crafts and a course of lectures at the Courtauld Institute. He taught part-time at Emanuel School, Wandsworth, from 1948–58, then part-time at Hornsey College of Art until retirement in 1984.

Public collections include Victoria & Albert Museum, Salford Art Gallery, Nuffield Foundation and Cambridge University. Corporate collections including Staveley Industries, Lintas and Rank Xerox. The Tate Gallery archive holds Bury’s self-portrait.

Bury’s interest in figure subjects in the 1950s changed to landscape in the 1960s, landscapes “not real but a collection of seen ideas. Gradually texture of the paint became more important.” He wrote that “studies in the organisation of colour relationships and the optical qualities which create a sense of space” were important to him.
