= The Return of the Son of Monster Magnet =

"The Return of the Son of Monster Magnet (Unfinished Ballet in Two Tableaux)"

Song by the Mothers of Invention

from the album Freak Out!
- Released: June 27, 1966
- Recorded: March 12, 1966
- Genre: Experimental rock; avant-garde; musique concrète; acid rock; art rock; noise
- Length: 12:17
- Label: Verve
- Composer: Frank Zappa
- Producer: Frank Zappa

"The Return of the Son of Monster Magnet" is a Frank Zappa composition, performed by the Mothers of Invention, released on the Mothers' debut album, Freak Out! It is the longest song on the album, at 12:17, consisting of 2 parts: "Ritual Dance Of The Child-Killer", and "Nullis Pretii (No Commercial Potential)". The composition includes a musical quote from "Louie Louie" (Richard Berry).

The name of the song was probably inspired by a toy called "Monster Magnet" from the Wham-O company which was then being heavily advertised on American television. "The Return of the Son of Monster Magnet" consists of an avant-garde sound collage. The first half is dominated by insistent rock-style drumming and occasional piano riffs overlaid by chanted, grunting or yelping vocals, while the second portion is mostly vocals manipulated via tape music.

According to Zappa himself, the Freak Out! version of this song is merely a rhythm track and was never finished as intended. Apparently for budgetary reasons, Verve executives curtailed further recording of the track even after shelling out $500 for rented percussion. Indeed, the subtitle of the track is "an Unfinished Ballet in two Tableaux". Unlike many of his extended works, Zappa never augmented or completed this piece when he had the time, money and his own recording studio.

Dr. John (Mac Rebennack) appears on piano, and his voice can be heard sporadically throughout the track. Van Dyke Parks was also present at the recording session, but it is unclear what instruments he may have performed.

According to Beatles author and Zappa biographer Barry Miles, the unreleased Beatles experimental track "Carnival of Light" which was recorded in January 1967 resembles "The Return of The Son of Monster Magnet", although it is believed that "Carnival of Light" is more fragmented and abstract than Zappa's effort the previous year.

"The Return of the Son of Monster Magnet" (sample)

== Suzy Creamcheese ==
The song begins with the following dialogue:

Male voice: Suzy?
Female voice: Yes?
Male voice: Suzy Creamcheese?
Female voice: Yes?
Male voice: This is the voice of your conscience baby ... uh, I just want to check one thing out with you ... you don't mind, do ya?
Female voice: What?
Male voice: Suzy Creamcheese, honey, what's got into ya?

This is the first mention of Suzy Creamcheese on any Mothers album, although a "Suzie" is mentioned on side 3 of Freak Out! in the track "It Can't Happen Here". And the line "Suzy Creamcheese, what's got into you?" can also be read in a speech balloon on the back cover of the album.
