= Take 6 (brand) =

British fashion and apparel brand with origins in 1960s London

- Take 6 boutique signage on Carnaby Street, London, in the 1960s.
- Company type: Private
- Industry: Fashion
- Founded: 1965
- Founders: Sidney Brent, Jack Collins
- Headquarters: London, England
- Area served: United Kingdom
- Products: Clothing, accessories

Take 6 (always styled with the numeral 6) is a British fashion brand with origins as a boutique chain founded in London in the mid-1960s. The original Take 6 stores were closely associated with London in the Swinging Sixties and the fashion culture surrounding Carnaby Street, Soho, Oxford Street, and King's Road, Chelsea, and have since become part of the documented history of British youth fashion.

Today, Take 6 continues as a modern unisex fashion brand that draws inspiration from its city of origin, London, England.

== History ==
The beginnings of Take 6 trace back to East London's post-war street-trading scene. According to family accounts and former employees, Sidney Brent began selling handbags and accessories from a barrow in markets such as Romford and Hackney, while Jack Collins operated a small Romford shop selling ladies’ gloves. The two men formed a partnership known as Brent & Collins.

When wholesalers could not supply the styles they wanted, Brent began designing garments himself, giving the business a more distinctive look. In the 1960s, the partners renamed the business Take 6 and opened boutiques in London's West End.

Historical boutique maps and published retrospectives note Take 6 operating in multiple Soho and West End locations during the 1960s, including Wardour Street, an area known for its concentration of fashion boutiques and film-industry offices at the time. The name Take 6 is said to have been chosen because the shop was located six doors down from a film production company. The brand expanded into Soho and the West End, including additional locations on Carnaby Street, Great Marlborough Street, Oxford Street, and King's Road in Chelsea.

By the 1970s, Take 6 operated as a small chain with locations recorded on Oxford Street, Marble Arch, Bond Street, Wardour Street, Great Marlborough Street, Carnaby Street, King's Road, Kensington Church Street, East Ham, Romford, Barking and Southend, as shown in contemporary boutique maps and Carnaby Street archives.

Like many independent West End boutiques of the period, Take 6's original physical stores closed in the early 1980s as central London retail rents rose and larger companies came to dominate high-street fashion. Former employees recall the gradual closure of branches during this time.

== Cultural influence ==
Take 6 is considered part of the broader shift in British menswear known as the Peacock Revolution, which introduced bolder colours, expressive tailoring and more creative silhouettes into mainstream men's fashion during the 1960s and 1970s.

Vintage fashion sources describe Take 6's clothing as eclectic and sometimes avant-garde, aimed at the expanding youth fashion market. Founder Sidney Brent actively courted show-business personalities and musicians as customers.

A published 1966 press photograph shows members of The Troggs outside the Take 6 boutique on Wardour Street with shop owner Sid Brent, taken when their single "Wild Thing" reached No.2 in the UK Singles Chart; the group had been promised £1,000 worth of clothing if the record made the Top 5.

Carnaby Street and King's Road, where Take 6 operated, were well-documented hubs for 1960s pop groups and musicians. Artists such as The Bee Gees, The Small Faces, The Animals, The Troggs, The Beatles, The Rolling Stones, The Who, The Kinks and Jimi Hendrix were known to visit boutiques in these districts.

Some secondary sources suggest that musicians like Jimi Hendrix, Mick Jagger and David Bowie may have been customers, though no primary photographic or press evidence has been found to confirm this.

A period photograph from the late 1960s shows shoppers and live performers inside a Take 6 boutique, illustrating the blend of youth fashion and live music characteristic of the era. The broader fashion–music crossover later inspired stylised depictions in films such as Austin Powers and What’s New Pussycat?

== Products and stores ==
Take 6 sold tailored jackets, coats, casual separates and accessories. Surviving garments with the Take 6 label occasionally appear in vintage marketplaces, auctions, and museum collections, including the Victoria and Albert Museum.

Additional surviving examples of Take 6 garments are documented in specialist vintage archives and auction listings.

== Legacy ==
Although the original boutiques closed in the 1980s, Take 6 remains recognised among collectors. Garments bearing the label continue to appear in auctions and vintage markets. The brand is frequently referenced in retrospectives covering the fashion history of Carnaby Street, Soho and King's Road.
