= Business as Usual (film) =

1988 film by Lezli-An Barrett

- Directed by: Lezli-An Barrett
- Written by: Lezli-An Barrett
- Produced by: Sara Geater; Colin McKeown
- Starring: Glenda Jackson; John Thaw; Cathy Tyson
- Cinematography: Ernest Vincze
- Edited by: Henry Richardson
- Music by: The Style Council
- Distributed by: Cannon Film Distributors (USA)
- Release dates: April 18, 1988 (UK); October 21, 1988 (United States)
- Running time: 89 minutes
- Countries: United Kingdom; United States
- Language: English

Business as Usual is a 1988 drama film written and directed by Lezli-An Barrett. It stars Glenda Jackson and John Thaw. The story is based on the real-life case of Audrey White, a manager at a chain of Lady at Lord John boutiques who was fired from her job after complaining about sexual harassment.

== Plot ==
Babs Flynn is the manager of a Liverpool boutique. When she accuses the regional manager of sexual harassment, she is sacked. Flynn then mounts a public campaign to get her job back.

== Cast ==
- Glenda Jackson as Babs Flynn
- John Thaw as Kieran Flynn
- Cathy Tyson as Josie Patterson
- Eamon Boland as Mr. Barry
- James Hazeldine as Mark
- Mark McGann as Stevie Flynn
- Craig Charles as Eddie

== Awards ==
Business as Usual won the Grand Prix at the 1988 Créteil International Women's Film Festival.
