= Lady Jane (boutique) =

Women's fashion boutique in London's Carnaby Street

Coordinates: 51.5132°N 0.1387°W

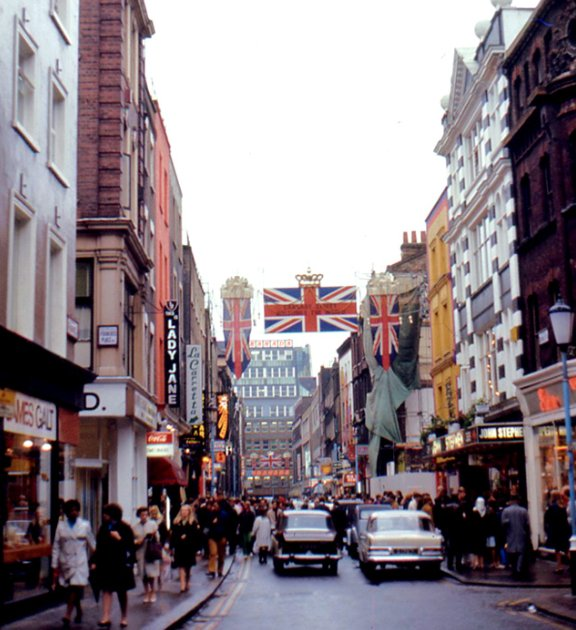
London: Carnaby Street (1968) with Lady Jane fashion boutique on left side

The attention-grabbing window display in the first days of Lady Jane

Lady Jane was the first women's fashion boutique on London's Carnaby Street. It was opened by Henry Moss and his partner Harry Fox in April 1966 and was seen as a counterpart to Warren Gold's Lord John chain.

== Background ==
The shop was one of the new wave of fashionable boutiques that were revitalising Carnaby Street which before the early 1960s had been a down-at-heel area of mixed shops. Lady Jane was on the site of a former dairy. Designer Marion Foale described the general Carnaby area in 1962 as follows: "People lived there, there was a dairy, a tobacconist, a newsagent – there was this little courtyard and everything… a proper village, though very run down." The shop's name is an allusion to Lady Chatterley's Lover, which uses the term "Lady Jane" to mean female genitalia; The Rolling Stones released a song entitled "Lady Jane" at almost the exact same time as the boutique opened.

== Publicity ==
The shop gained great publicity from the national press, and attracted the attention of crowds of potential customers by having models changing in the shop window for three days. Henry Moss was quoted as saying "Then I got arrested. I thought it was for indecency, although the girls were wearing underwear. I was tried at Gt. Marlborough Street Court and fined £2 for obstructing the highway". A visit by Jayne Mansfield garnered further publicity. Harry Fox was also arrested several times for obstruction of the highway, when crowds gathered outside during publicity stunts.

In a 1967 publicity stunt, Harry Fox and Henry Moss stood for election as ‘Independent Carnaby Street’ candidates in the Westminster and the City of London

Lady Jane had a reputation for being a little shocking. When a see-through clothing craze started in London fashion in the late 1960s, the shop retained artist Audrey Watson to paint bras on its female customers. There were also plenty of male customers for the service.

One unusual line of goods was plaques bearing the coats of arms of extinct families. Harry Fox wrote to The Times in 1969 defending the sales, saying that they helped the British export drive as the purchasers were often based overseas, particularly in America. Fox was also quoted as saying to a judge, referring to one of the publicity stunts "This is good for London, good for Carnaby Street and good for Lady Jane".

== Fox and Moss ==
Fox and Moss soon went their separate ways. Harry Fox continued with the original Lady Jane, and also opened Lady Jane Again, Lady Jane's Birdcage and Sir Harry a menswear shop, all in Carnaby Street, until the early 1980s. Henry Moss started The London Mob, Sweet Fanny Adams, Pussy Galore and eventually Henry Moss of London.

Harry Fox was president of the Carnaby Street Trading Association and it was his idea to install Carnaby Street's first sign: "Carnaby Street Welcomes The World" which now reads "Welcome to Carnaby Street"

== Homage ==
In 2011 the documentary 'Carnaby Street Undressed' was released featuring Henry Moss speaking about Lady Jane and the times leading up to the swinging sixties and beyond.

In 2013, the lead female character is called Lady Jane in the musical Carnaby Street by Carl Leighton-Pope, which opened at the Hackney Empire, London, and then toured nationally.

In 2019, the site of Lady Jane was awarded a green plaque by Westminster City Council, celebrating Moss & Fox's shop as the first iconic women's fashion boutique on Carnaby Street.
