= Mr Firecul =

- Directed by: Jade Carmen
- Written by: Jade Carmen; Louis Paltnoi
- Starring: David Ginola
- Distributed by: Jinx Films
- Release date: 2004
- Running time: 25 minutes
- Country: United Kingdom
- Language: English

Mr Firecul is a 2004 British short film starring footballer David Ginola.

== Synopsis ==
Mr Firecul is a short film about the Devil trying to re-brand himself. He approaches one top public relations experts for a makeover. The only problem is he isn't dead yet.

== Background ==
Mr Firecul is an anagram of Mr Lucifer. The film was written by Jade Carmen and Louis Paltnoi. The film was produced by Louis Paltnoi, and the production company was Jinx Films. Mr Firecul had its London premiere at the Odeon Covent Garden on 5 August 2004. The film was acquired for television distribution in the UK and its first broadcast premiere was in 2005.

== Cast ==
- David Ginola as Mr. Firecul
- Michael Brown as Jason Collridge
- Chris Ryman as Sam
- Rebecca Kenyon as Sandra
- Jack Knight as Mr. Gray
- Pauline Hardy as Neighbour
- Rojer Weightman as Policeman 1
- David Garry as Policeman 2
- Lauren Gold as Model 1
- Kasey Wynter as Model 2
- Manolita Bernal as Model 3
- Udias Dos Santos as Dancer 1
- Allen Kaheja as Dancer 2
- Yaritza Sojo Foucaud as Dancer 3
- Anisha Shah as Dancer 4
