= Warren Gold =

- Born: Warren Allen Gold; 17 January 1938
- Died: 2015 (aged 76–77)
- Occupation: fashion retailer
- Known for: co-founder, Lord John
- Spouse: Valerie Levey
- Children: 6 including Lauren Gold
- Relatives: Harold Gold (brother); David Gold (brother)

Warren Allen Gold (17 January 1938 – 2015) was a British fashion retailer, and with his brothers Harold and David founded the fashion chain Lord John.

== Early life ==
Warren Allen Gold was born in January 1938.

== Career ==
The first Lord John boutique was opened by Warren, Harold and David Gold in London's Carnaby Street in 1963, and the choice of name led to litigation from John Stephen who already owned several fashion shops in the street.

In 1967, the store had a three-storey high giant psychedelic mural on the outside of the building, painted by the artist group Binder Edwards & Vaughan, known as BEV.

Lord John was very popular with mods, and regular customers included the pop groups The Small Faces, The Who, and Brian Jones of the Rolling Stones.

Lord John had eight shops by 1970, and grew to about 30 in the early 1970s, before being acquired by the retail group Raybeck, who sold it to Next in the mid-1980s, when they became Next stores.

In the 1980s, the Gold brothers opened the Big Red Building on Petticoat Lane, and became early pioneers of the discount factory shop, before later relocating to Golders Green as Gold's Factory Outlet, now run by Warren's son Jamie Gold.

== Personal life ==
Gold married Valerie Levey, a fashion model, and they had three children, Lauren Gold is a model and actress. His first wife was Barbara Sugarman and he had three daughters.
