= Audrey White (activist) =

British retired shopworker and activist (born 1951)

Audrey White (born 1951) is a British former shopworker whose activism in the 1980s led to breakthrough legislation on sexual harassment in the United Kingdom. Her activism also drew attention to the use of legislation banning picketing and the use of strip searching by the police. Her experience was the inspiration for the film Business as Usual, in which Glenda Jackson played White.

== Employment protest ==
In 1983, White was working as the manager of the Liverpool branch of Lady at Lord John’s, the women's clothing chain associated with the men's fashion retail chain Lord John. An area manager sexually harassed four women in her team. After she filed a complaint and protested, White was fired. Her supervisor brought in the police to physically evict her from work. White, however, was a member of the TWGU (now Unite), and this union attempted to negotiate with her employers. The owners of Lady at Lord John, however, refused so White and her union organized a picket in front of the shop.

According to White, the company first fired her over the phone and her union advised her to keep showing up to the workplace until the termination of her work was given in writing. The store manager then summoned the police to arrest her for refusing to leave work. Together with union members, White started picketing in front of the store and their protest went on for five weeks. As days passed, it generated more interest and attracted more protesters such as dockers, car workers, staff from unemployed centres, and local activists. The protesters urged for a public boycott. They also started holding pickets at the Lady at Lord John’s clothing stores in Manchester and London. When these happened, the company relented, paid White her lost earnings, and reinstated her into her old job.

Peter Taaffe, then one of the leaders of the Militant tendency in Liverpool Labour Party, described White as "a long-standing Militant supporter" in his chapter about the dispute in his 1988 book about Militant in Liverpool.

White became a national figure, campaigning against sexual harassment in the workplace. The TUC credited the protest and her activism as one of the precursors of a later amendment to the Sex Discrimination Act 1975, where the legal definition of harassment was set out in law. The strike also contributed to the discourse of related issues involving political activists such as the law against picketing and the police's use of strip searching.

Her experience was adapted into a 1988 film called Business as Usual, in which Glenda Jackson played White. White was credited as co-writing the film with Lezli-An Barrett.

== Stop The War Protest ==
White took a prominent role in the “Stop the War” protests of the 2000s, against the post 9/11 wars in Afghanistan and Iraq, which were prosecuted by an American-led collation of which Britain was a prominent member. On 20 September 2008 White attended a protest at the Labour Party conference in Manchester, where she was also invited to meet politicians as part of a delegation.

As an act of political satire, White had a banner-sized Bank of England ‘mock cheque’ made up payable to the ‘Oil Companies and Arms Industry for the wars in Afghanistan and Iraq – the sum of 12 billion pounds, the blood of one million Iraqis and the deaths of 300 British soldiers’ and signed in the name of then-British Prime Minister Gordon Brown. She also wore a rubber Gordon Brown face-mask.

Towards the end of the protest, White was approached by an officer of Greater Manchester Police and ordered to remove the Gordon Brown mask she was wearing. She was not told why and declined to do so. The officer then forcibly removed the mask with help from another colleague, dragging White to the ground and causing her injury in the process. The police confiscated the mask, but White was not arrested.

White subsequently sued Greater Manchester Police with the help of leading actions against the police solicitor, Iain Gould, winning damages and a formal written apology from the Chief Constable of Greater Manchester.

== Labour Party membership ==
White has been suspended at least twice from the Labour Party

In 2019, The Jewish Chronicle published four stories about White, incorrectly claiming that she had been expelled from the Labour Party in the 1980s, and that she had lied about her date of birth on re-joining in 2015. The articles also incorrectly claimed White had "received a number of formal warnings from the Party over allegations of bullying", and that White had been a member of the Socialist Party (Militant's main successor party). White complained to the Independent Press Standards Organisation about these articles, which upheld the complaint requiring The Jewish Chronicle to publish the adjudication and a retraction. The Jewish Chronicle stated it had relied on confidential sources within the Labour Party for their information, but had failed to corroborate the claims. The Jewish Chronicle later paid White damages and her legal costs, and apologised for the distress caused.

She was later suspended from the party for an interview with Socialist Appeal, another Militant successor party proscribed in 2021 by Labour.

In 2022, White was expelled from the Labour Party after confronting party leader Keir Starmer while he was visiting Liverpool, criticising him for writing for the Sun newspaper, accusing him of right-wing policies, betraying his promises to party members and "witch-hunting" members who challenge him. The incident was captured on video by film-makers Hazuan Hashim and Phil Maxwell and went viral online. During this period, she was the secretary of Merseyside Pensioners Association.

== Arrest ==
On 20 July 2025, White was arrested at a pro-Palestine rally in Liverpool under the Terrorism Act 2000 on suspicion of wearing or carrying an article in support of the proscribed organisation Palestine Action. She was holding up a sign when she was surrounded by officers who dragged her across the footpath and handcuffed her while she was on the ground. Regarding the Gaza genocide, White said "how can we stop our country’s involvement in this genocide? Everyone has a responsibility to stop horrors like this all throughout history". She was held at a police station for eight hours before being released on police bail. Her bail conditions banned White from entering Liverpool City Centre, which she described as being "trapped in the house" since she lives in the city centre.
