= Merc Clothing =

British clothing brand

Merc Group of Companies Ltd.
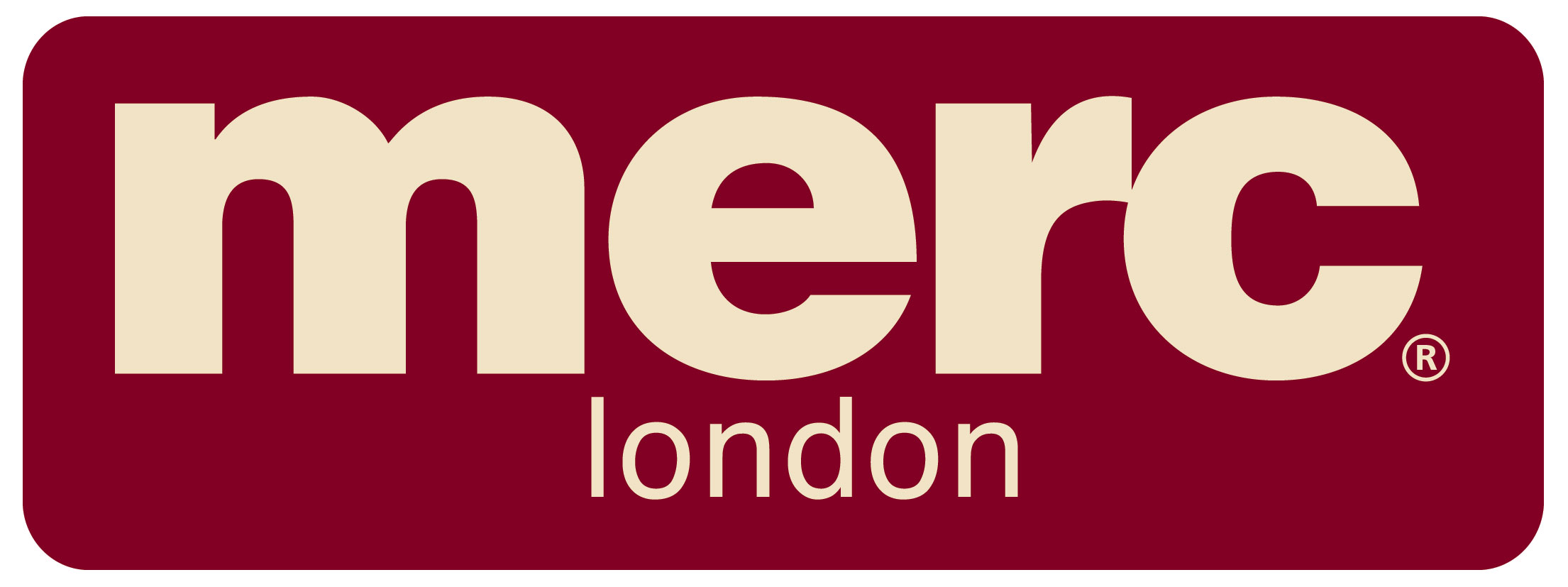
- Founded: 1967, Carnaby Street, England
- Founder: Javid Alavi
- Products: Mod, skinhead, casual and more
- Website: www.merc.com

Merc Clothing is a United Kingdom–based clothing company which specialises in the production of shirts, trousers, suits, parkas, harrington jackets, shoes and accessories for men and women (primarily focusing on the former).

== History ==
Founded by Javid Alavi in London in 1967, and with a presence on Carnaby Street, Merc Clothing aimed to fill a demand for a specific look in 1960s England. Originally, in addition to their own merchandise, they stocked brands such as Fred Perry, Farah and Lonsdale, later dropping these brands to exclusively sell Merc products. Since then, Merc has continued to grow, and now ships goods to every continent via their website.

== Products ==
Although the brand originally focused on the mod and skinhead styles, they have adapted to target a wider clientele. They also carry a more casual range of jeans and T-shirts. The brand occasionally incorporates the Royal Air Force roundel (sometimes called the mod target) in its designs. Merc Clothing is a privately owned company.

== See also ==
- Castro (clothing)
