= John Stephen =

Scottish fashion retailer (1934–2004)

- Born: 28 August 1934; Glasgow, Scotland
- Died: 1 February 2004 (aged 69)
- Occupation: fashion retailer

John Stephen (28 August 1934 – 1 February 2004), dubbed by the media the £1m Mod and the King Of Carnaby Street, was one of the most important fashion figures of the 1960s.

Stephen was the first individual to identify and sell to the young menswear mass market which emerged in the late 1950s and early 1960s. He was also the pioneer of the high turnover, disposable fashion ethos of such contemporary operators as Topman.

By 1967, Stephen operated a chain of 15 shops on the thoroughfare in central London which he and boyfriend Bill Franks made the epicentre of Swinging London: Carnaby Street.

"Carnaby is my creation," Stephen said in 1967. "I feel about it the same way Michelangelo felt about the beautiful statues he created."

== Career ==
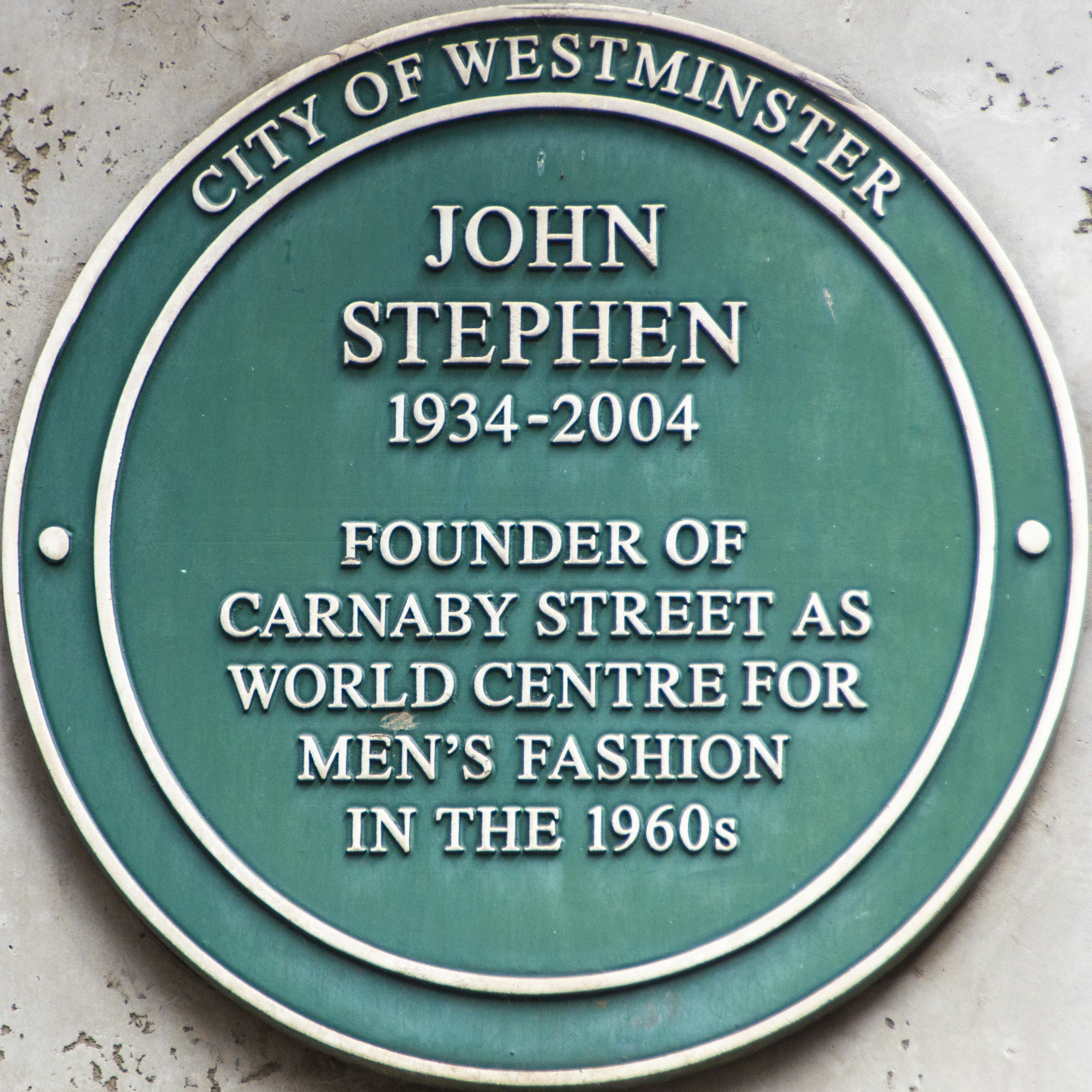
Plaque at 1 Carnaby Street

Born in Glasgow, Stephen became a welder's apprentice on leaving school. He moved to London from Glasgow in 1952 at the age of 18, and worked as a waiter and also for London's first young male boutique, Vince Man Shop in Newburgh Street, central London.

In 1956 Stephen opened his own retail outlet in Beak Street but a fire at the premises forced a move in 1957 to 5 Carnaby Street, then an undistinguished narrow parade behind the London Palladium.

He and Franks made their mark by painting the exterior canary yellow and blaring out pop music, while selling short-runs of such designs as jeans in various colours, simple unlined three-button jackets, matelot shirts, Italian knits, etc.

This outlet – called His Clothes – was followed by others under Stephen's name or other titles including Domino Male, Mod Male and Male W1.

Stephen's fast-turnover approach to design and free-and-easy retail environments with music and attractive young staff was soon emulated by others including Lord John, Take Six, Gear and Mates.

Stephen expanded his retail business – including outlets for female customers – with shops in other London locations, including Chelsea, opened a clothing manufacturer in Glasgow and operated franchises in the US and Russia.

John Stephen opened the first boutique with women's clothing on Carnaby Street called TreCamp.

Stephen's clothes were worn by those at the forefront of the beat boom and Swinging London, including the Who, the Kinks, the Rolling Stones and the Small Faces.

Such was the popularity of Carnaby Street that it was paved and pedestrianised in 1973. Thereafter it became home to tourist and novelty outlets, as London fashion's centre moved west to Chelsea, with such psychedelic stores as Michael Rainey's Hung On You, Granny Takes a Trip, Mr Freedom and Dandie Fashions, and Kensington, Biba and Bus Stop.

Stephen's company was publicly floated in 1972 and closed in 1975, when the archive was donated to the Victoria & Albert Museum.

In the mid-1970s Stephen imported continental European designs for a new chain of shops, Francisco-M, and represented fashion franchises in the UK, including that for Lanvin.

Stephen died in 2004. In his last interview, for Paul Gorman's fashion history The Look, Stephen said, "I was the same age and into pop music, so I gave kids something they could wear to complement that. There was nobody else around doing what I was doing, so I had it all to myself for a long time. Once others started coming through, all they could do was copy me."

In 2005, Westminster City Council unveiled a green plaque at 1 Carnaby Street to commemorate Stephen's importance to London and his influence over fashion.
