= Bora Aksu =

Turkish fashion designer

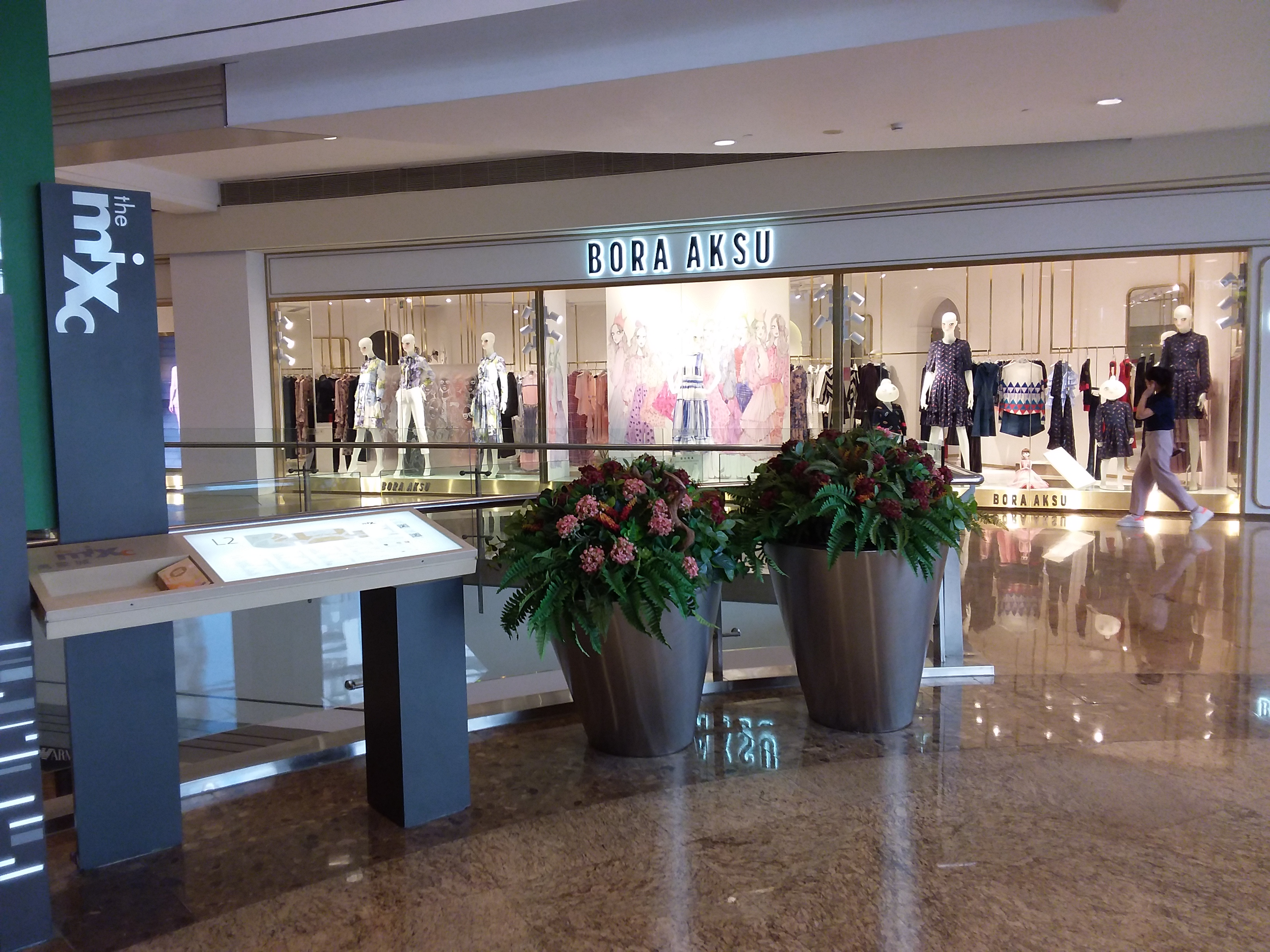
Shop

Bora Aksu is a Turkish-born fashion designer based in London, known for his romantic, ethereal aesthetic that blends delicate fabrics with structured silhouettes. He has been a regular participant of London Fashion Week and is often associated with a style described as “dark romanticism.”

== Early life and education ==
Bora Aksu was born in Izmir, Turkey, and grew up surrounded by traditional craftsmanship, which later influenced his design language. He moved to the United Kingdom to study at Central Saint Martins, where he completed both his Bachelor's and Master's degrees in Fashion Design.

== Career ==
Aksu set up his fashion label upon graduation from his MA at Central Saint Martins. He has showcased his collections in London Fashion Week since 2003. His collection is stocked in Selfridges, Wolf & Badger and Liberty & Co in London and he has 61 stores, primarily in Asia. He has also prepared seven window displays at Selfridges and is a 4 times NEWGEN recipient.

In September 2020, Aksu was the first live show during London Fashion Week, and one of only four live shows held during the event that year due to the global pandemic. Aksu says his collections are "inspired by romantic women who are fragile but self-confident."
