= Lord John =

Former British fashion retailer

Coordinates: 51.513°N 0.138°W

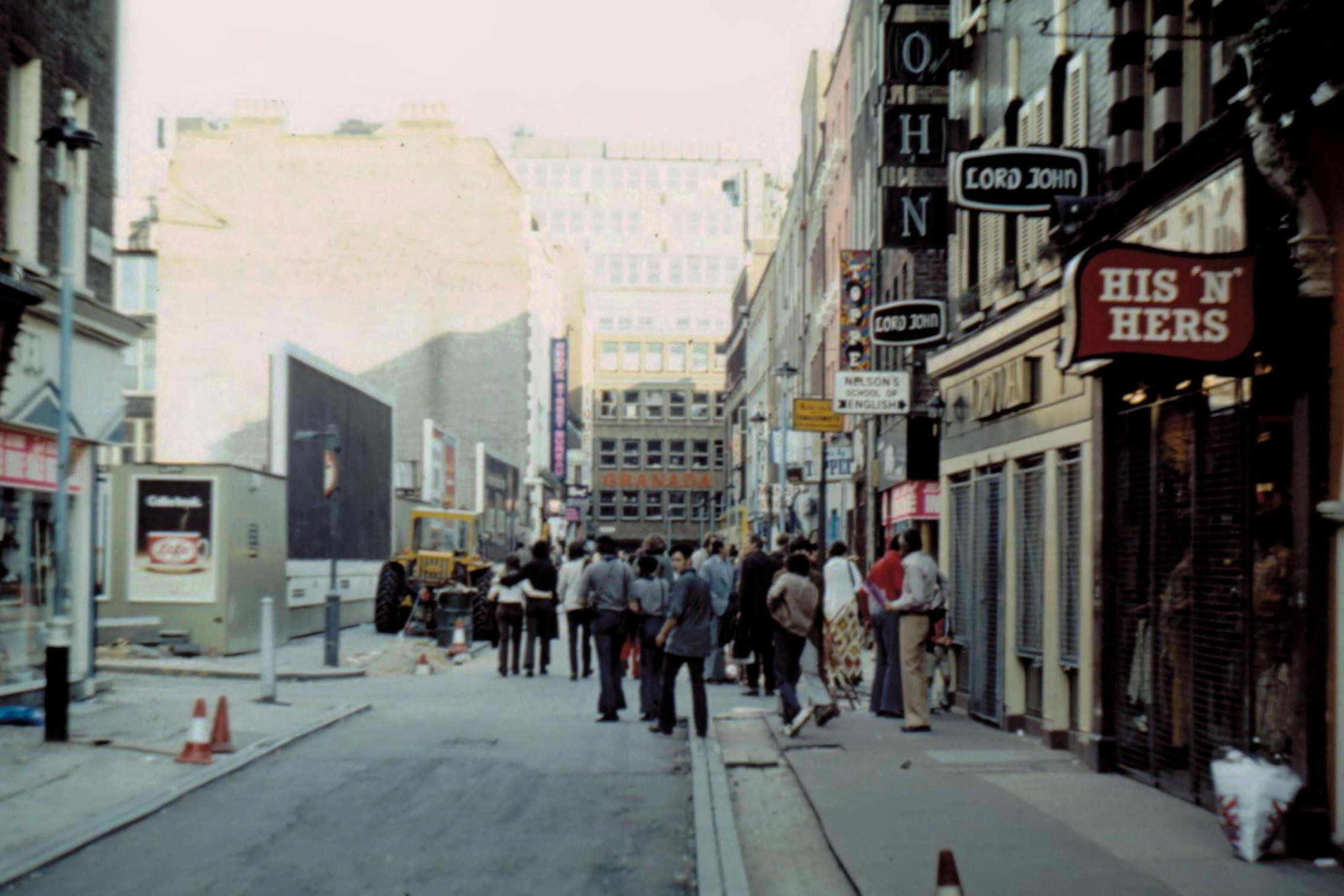
- Carnaby Street branch, 1973
- Industry: Fashion retailer
- Founded: 1963
- Founder: Warren Gold; Harold Gold; David Gold
- Headquarters: London, England

Lord John was a British men's fashion retailer, which opened its first store at 43 Carnaby Street, London, at the corner with Ganton Street, in 1963.

The first Lord John boutique was opened by the brothers Warren, Harold and David Gold in Carnaby Street in 1963, and the choice of name led to litigation from John Stephen who already owned several fashion shops in the street.

In 1967, the store had a three-storey high giant psychedelic mural on the outside of the building, painted by the then largely unknown pop-art collective Doug Binder, Dudley Edwards and David Vaughan (BEV).

Lord John was very popular with mods, and regular customers included the pop groups The Small Faces, The Who, and Brian Jones of the Rolling Stones. It appeared on the cover of the 1967 album This Is My Scene by the Alan Tew orchestra, and was also seen in the 1969 horror film The Haunted House of Horror.

Lord John had eight shops by 1970, and grew to about 30 in the early 1970s, before being acquired by the retail group Raybeck. The company sponsored a chess tournament, the Lord John Cup, in 1977.

== Lady at Lord John industrial dispute ==
In 1983 there was an industrial dispute at the Lady at Lord John branch in Liverpool. Audrey White, the manager of the store, complained of sexual harassment experienced by four members of her staff by an area manager. When senior management tried to sack her, White found that although she had little support amongst other workers at the store, other workers in Liverpool and further afield supported by setting up picket lines outside the store in Liverpool and other company stores in Manchester and Liverpool. After five weeks the company backed down and White was reinstated. The TUC credit this strike as playing a significant part in the campaign for workplace equality legislation such as the Employment Equality (Sex Discrimination) Regulations 2005.

The film, Business as Usual featured Glenda Jackson playing the role of Audrey White, who was credited as co-writing the film with Lezli-An Barrett.

== End of the line ==
It was sold to Next in the mid-1980s, when they became Next stores.
