= Dudley Edwards =

English painter (born 1944)

- Born: 1944 (age 81–82); Halifax, England, UK
- Occupation: Painter
- Years active: 1960s–present

Dudley Edwards (born 1944, Halifax, Yorkshire) is an English painter, draughtsman and applied artist specialising in illustration, textiles, ceramics, murals and photography.

== Biography ==
Edwards was born in Halifax, England, to Muriel and Jack Edwards. He was educated at Halifax School of Art (1960–1962) and then Bradford College of Art (1962–1965). He then moved to London, becoming known as an "undisputed protagonist of the London rock scene". He became a significant figure in the London art scene during the 1960s and beyond. His work over the years apart from painting has included graphic design and illustration, murals, textile design, photography, film direction and ceramic arts.

=== BEV ===
Edwards first came to prominence in the mid-1960s during the Swinging London era, and quickly confirmed his legendary credentials as co-founder of pioneering pop art collective 'Binder, Edwards & Vaughan' aka BEV – a collective consisting of artwork by Douglas Binder and Edwards, with David Vaughan acting as their manager/agent. Binder and Edwards produced vibrantly painted furniture:

In 1965, aged 20, the Guinness heir Tara Browne commissioned BEV to paint his newly acquired AC Cobra (AC 289 Sports), ‘to give it the treatment’. Brown subsequently introduced BEV to the Beatles. Tragically, Browne was killed in a car accident in 1966 at the young age of 21 (driving a different car). His death was the inspiration for "A Day in the Life" by the Beatles.

The Tara Browne AC Cobra was exhibited at the Robert Fraser Gallery in Mayfair and subsequently was the subject of a photo-shoot by Lord Snowdon for both ‘Paris Match’ and ‘Look’ magazines.

One of the most notable pieces that BEV painted was Paul McCartney's "magic" piano. The piano now resides in his music room in London. According to McCartney writing the songs 'Getting Better', 'Sgt Peppers Lonely Hearts Club Band' and 'Fixing a Hole' on the decorative piano "added to all the fun of it". The psych-painted instrument is said to have also inspired the 'Hey Jude' album's kaleidoscope aesthetic. BEV were selected to represent the ‘Swinging Sixties’ at Madame Tussauds, in recognition of their artistic contribution to that era. The piano was described by Micky Dolenz of The Monkees as "the freakiest thing you've ever seen".

Group murals appeared everywhere from the boutiques of Kings Road and Carnaby Street to the British Pavilion at Montreal's Expo '67.

1967 also saw Edwards painting murals in the homes of Sir Paul McCartney and Ringo Starr, living in their houses for six months.

The collective were renowned for their ground-breaking light shows, including 'The Million Volt Light & Sound Rave' at The Roundhouse in London. This multimedia art, light and sound installation featured the only known public presentation of the 'Carnival of Light' sound collage created by Paul McCartney and John Lennon during recording sessions for their Sgt Pepper album.

The group disbanded in 1967, although their 'architectural work positioned [them] at the forefront of cutting edge Art and Design [that] would go on to inspire the Graffiti and Street Art movements that would develop years later.' Despite their short existence, between 1965 and 1967, the group was described as being 'The Beatles of the art world.'

In 2014, McCartney reused the "magic piano" for a performance at the 56th Annual Grammy Awards.

=== OM Tentacle ===
Later that year Dudley Edwards and Michael McInnerney merged their identity together as ‘OM Tentacle’, named after the OM sound, or OM point at the beginning of creation, according to Buddhist and Hindu teachings. OM Tentacle painted the front of Flying Dragon Tea House (436 Kings Road, Chelsea), and made a number of psychedelic posters, record covers and book jackets, including the poster for the La Fenetre Rose concert in Paris and illustrations for 'The Beatles Illustrated Lyrics'.

When OM Tentacle disbanded, Edwards went on to co-direct (with Martin Cook) a documentary film ‘FRED’ about a devotee of Meher Baba for Pete Townshend. In the intervening years he continued to Illustrate Record Covers, book jackets, magazines and posters. These were interspersed with commissions from other genres. In the summer of 1975 he was commissioned by Stan Peskett to photograph the Harlem Ballet in New York's Rockefeller Plaza for Yves St Laurent. In 1982 Sheik Abdul Aziz-Zaidan commissioned him to paint a huge ceramic mural for his palace in Al Karj, and then - again working with Douglas Binder in 1976 he created a suite of sixteen ceramic murals for the Saudi Arabian Ministry of Defense HQ in Riyadh.

=== Teaching career ===
Dudley Edwards has taught at Hornsey College of Art, Stafford College of Art, Bradford College of Art. Leeds Metropolitan University and Cleveland College of Art. He has been a guest speaker at The Royal College of Art, London; The Commonwealth Institute, London; In Australia at Swinburne University, South Wales University and The Royal Melbourne Institute of Technology, In India at the NiA institute, Delhi; and in Ireland at the National College of Art & Design, Dublin.

=== AMAZED Ltd ===
In 1995 Edwards joined family business 'AMAZED Ltd' which his partner Madeleine Edwards had started previously. The couple create rugs and wall hangings for celebrities and the Big Brother house. Items of their textile collections have been part of exhibitions in the modern art gallery Tate Liverpool and the V&A, London: England See below for citation.

Dudley still continues to produce work and has exhibited at:

Arts Council Touring Exhibition to Edinburgh, Glasgow & Cardiff; Galerie 5, Geneva, Switzerland; Association of Illustrators Gallery, London; England & Co, London; the Musee d'Histoire Contemporaine, Paris; Brighton Art Gallery; Red House Gallery, Harrogate; The Victoria & Albert Museum, London; Tate Gallery, Liverpool; and Schirn Kunsthalle, Frankfurt; Kunsthalle Wien, Vienna; the Whitney Museum of Art, New York, The Crossley Gallery, Dean Clough Mills, Halifax. Redhouse Originals, Harrogate; England.

=== 2009-present ===
Since 2009, Edwards has continued to paint and his diverse output has continued to excite critics. His work has been exhibited in notable galleries throughout the world including the Robert Fraser Gallery in London and Galerie 5 in Geneva. Touring exhibitions have included the V&A, Tate Liverpool, Schirn Kunsthalle, Kunsthalle Wien, The Musee d'Histoire Contemporaine, and the Whitney Museum of Art.

Edwards has been a guest speaker at a number of renowned art institutions, including the Royal College of Art, the Commonwealth Institute in London, National College of Art & Design, and the NiA Institute in Delhi.

He recently filmed for Michael Caine's 2017 film My Generation.
