= Doug Binder =

British painter

Doug Binder (born 1941) is an English artist. His work has varied significantly over his career, and is now focused on oil paintings of the human form. Along with Dudley Edwards and David Vaughan, he co-founded the design collective BEV in the 1960s.

== Biography ==
Binder was born in Bradford in 1941, and studied at the Bradford College of Art, before moving on to the Royal College of Art in 1961, specialising in painting.

He was involved in the London arts scene during the "Swinging Sixties", associated with the nascent pop-psychedelic decor, with The Beatles being among his first customers. Paul McCartney commissioned him to paint his Knight piano. He was also involved with The Roundhouse, a London venue that hosted many high-profile musical acts during the 1960s and 1970s.

In the early 1970s, Binder's work changed, influenced by the pop culture of the time. In the latter half of the decade, he developed an interest in sculpture. Returning to the North of England in the 1980s, he took a renewed interest in oil painting and representation, and his work has been focused on this area since then.

Binder is the curator at the Dean Clough galleries in Halifax, West Riding, and is one of the site's in situ artists. He is still an active contributor to the galleries but no longer sells many of his works. In September 2007, Binder launched a solo exhibition at York gallery/studio, The ArtSpace. The show, "From the Life: New Paintings by Doug Binder", ran for three weeks. Binder returned to the same place, renamed from ArtSpace to "According to McGee", in November 2010 with a solo show entitled "Full Circle".
