= Carnaby Street =

Street in London

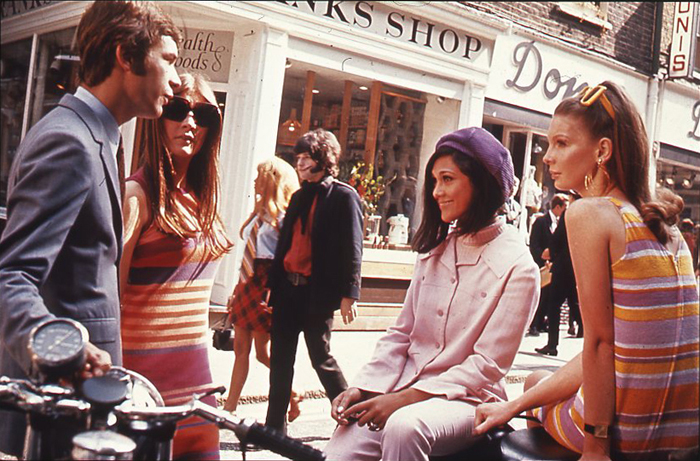
- Swinging London, Carnaby Street, c. 1966

- Location within City of Westminster
- Namesake: Karnaby House
- Maintained by: Westminster City Council
- Length: 250 m (820 ft)
- Location: Soho, London
- Postal code: W1
- Nearest Tube station: Oxford Circus
- Coordinates: 51°30′48″N 0°08′20″W
- South end: Beak Street
- North end: Great Marlborough Street

Construction
- Inauguration: 1685 or 1686

Other
- Known for: 1960s fashion
- Status: Pedestrianised

Carnaby Street is a pedestrianised shopping street in Soho in the City of Westminster. Close to Oxford Street and Regent Street, it is home to fashion and lifestyle retailers, including many independent fashion boutiques.

Streets crossing, or meeting with, Carnaby Street are, from south to north, Beak Street, Broadwick Street, Kingly Court, Ganton Street, Marlborough Court, Lowndes Court, Fouberts Place, Little Marlborough Street and Great Marlborough Street. The nearest London Underground station is Oxford Circus.

== History ==
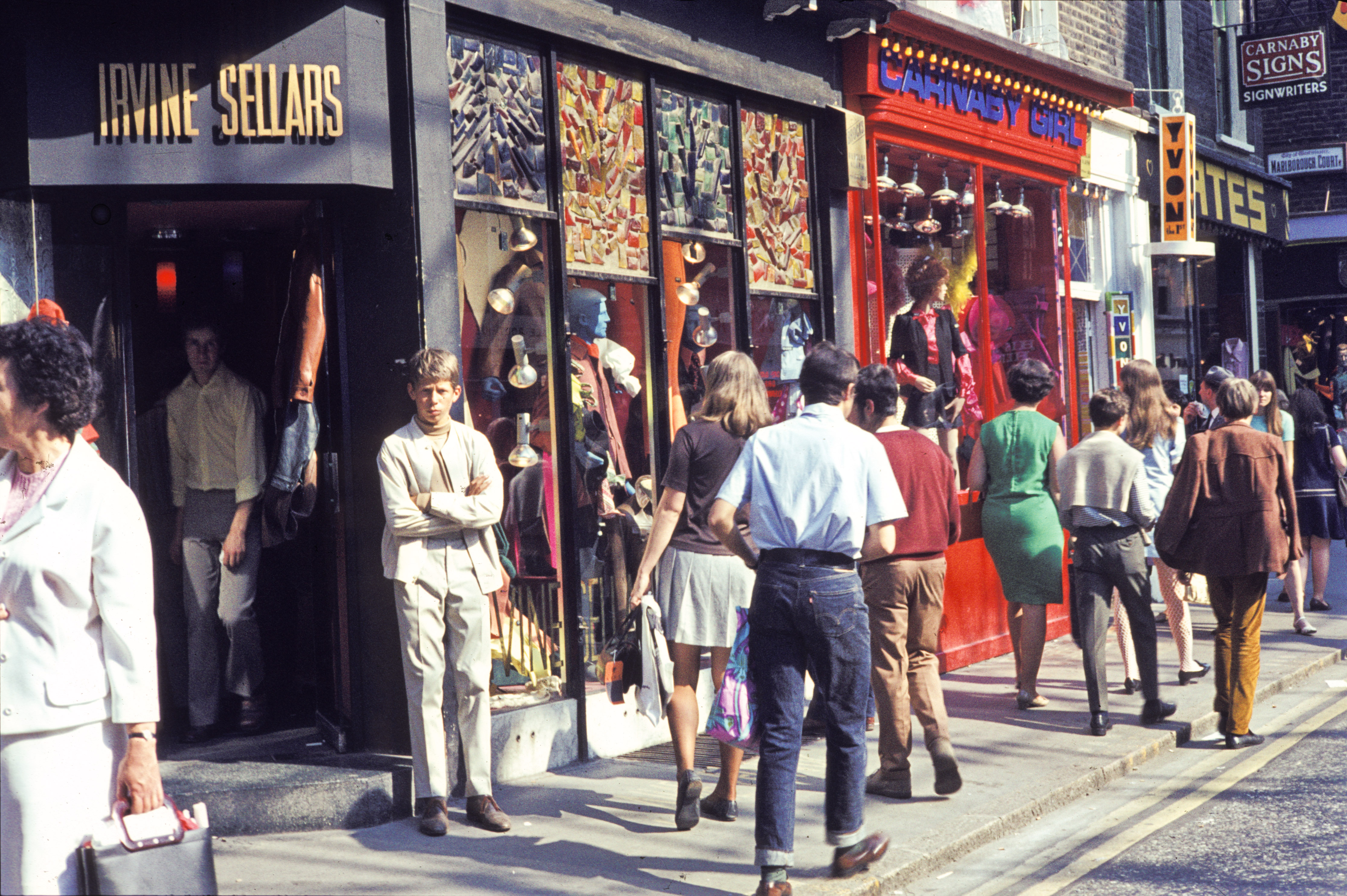
Irvine Sellars and other boutiques, Carnaby Street, 1968

Carnaby Street derives its name from Karnaby House, which was built in 1683 to the east. The origin of the name is unknown. The street was probably laid out in 1685 or 1686. First appearing in the ratebooks in 1687, it was almost completely built up by 1690 with small houses. A market was developed in the 1820s. In his novel, Sybil (1845), Benjamin Disraeli refers to "a carcase-butcher famous in Carnaby-market".

An outbreak of cholera in the area in 1854 led to an early application of fundamental epidemiological principles to stop the spread of disease. John Snow, the physician who recognised the cases were concentrated near a pump on Broad Street (later renamed Broadwick Street), communicated the finding on a topographical display. This led to the pump being de-activated, after which the reduction in cases of cholera was rapid.

=== 20th century ===
In 1934, Amy Ashwood Garvey and Sam Manning opened the Florence Mills Social Club at number 50, a jazz club that became a gathering place for supporters of Pan-Africanism.

Carnaby Street in the early 1950s was a shabby Soho backstreet consisting of "rag trade sweat shops, locksmiths and tailors, and a Central Electricity Board depot practically took up one side of the street." The genesis of Carnaby Street as a global fashion destination began with Bill 'Vince' Green, a male physique photographer. In 1954 he opened a small clothing boutique, Vince, in adjoining Newburgh Street, to capitalise on the homosexual body-building community that congregated around the Marshall Street baths. Those who modelled for the Vince catalogue and advertisements, and boosted its popularity, were the then barely-known Sean Connery and the hugely popular handsome boxer Billy Walker. To further attract custom, Green hired pretty young men as sales assistants, one of whom was the Glasgow-born John Stephen, later to be known as 'The King Of Carnaby Street'.

Stephen opened the boutique His Clothes in 1957 after his shop in Beak Street burned down. As Mary Quant later stated of Stephen, "He made Carnaby Street. He was Carnaby Street. He invented a look for young men which was wildly exuberant, dashing and fun." According to James Gardiner, who at one stage made ties for the Vince boutique, at this time Carnaby Street "was essentially a gay thing...The clothes, including pink shirts and skin-tight white pants, were designed to appeal to gay men, but soon went mainstream."

Stephen was followed by other men's fashion retailers, including Gear, Mates and Ravel. In 1966, Harry Fox and Henry Moss opened the first women's fashion boutique, Lady Jane, and later rented Foubert's Place to I Was Lord Kitchener's Valet, their first outlet in the area. Round the corner in Kingly Street, Tommy Roberts opened his gift shop, Kleptomania. He moved to Carnaby Street in 1967 and went on to become famous in the King's Road, Chelsea, with his Mr Freedom shop.

By the 1960s, Carnaby Street was popular with followers of the mod, hippie and peacock revolution styles. Many independent fashion designers, such as Mary Quant, Marion Foale, Sally Tuffin, Lord John, Merc, Take 6, and Irvine Sellars had premises in the street, and various underground music bars, such as the Roaring Twenties, opened in the surrounding streets. Bands such as the Small Faces, the Who and the Rolling Stones appeared in the area, to work (at the legendary Marquee Club round the corner in Wardour Street), to shop and to socialise, so it became one of the coolest destinations associated with 1960s Swinging London.

The first Cranks restaurant was opened at 22 Carnaby Street in 1961 by David and Kay Canter and Daphne Swann. Cranks grew into a chain and has been seen as a major factor in the spread of vegetarianism in recent decades.

The Carnaby Street contingent of Swinging London stormed into North American and international awareness with the 15 April 1966 publication of Time magazine's cover story that extolled this street's role:

Perhaps nothing illustrates the new swinging London better than narrow, three-block-long Carnaby Street, which is crammed with a cluster of the 'gear' boutiques where the girls and boys buy each other clothing...

In October 1973, the Greater London Council pedestrianised the street. A comparison of pedestrian traffic before and after the change revealed that there had been a 30% increase in the number of pedestrians entering the area. In early 2010, a campaign commenced for the pedestrianisation in the adjacent area of Soho. As of 2026, vehicle access is allowed between 6am and 11am.

Westminster City Council erected two green plaques, one at 1 Carnaby Street, dedicated to fashion entrepreneur John Stephen, who began the Mod fashion revolution, and another at 52/55 Carnaby Street, dedicated to the Mod pop group the Small Faces and their manager, Don Arden.

=== 21st century ===
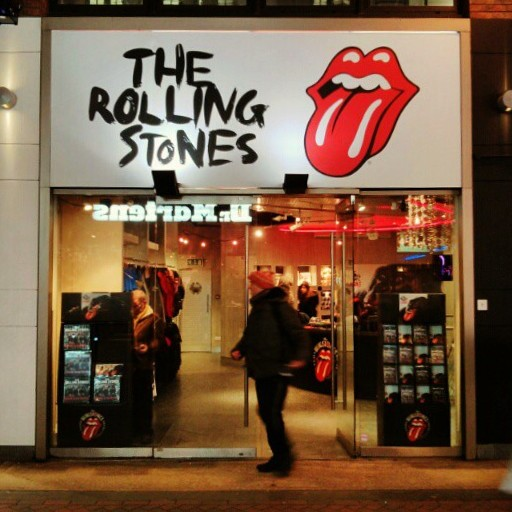
The Rolling Stones shop in Carnaby Street, 2012

To celebrate the memory of Freddie Mercury after the release of the film Bohemian Rhapsody, the Carnaby Street arch got a rework with Queen's logo being put up until early 2019.

Despite John Stephen closing his final business in 1975 (he died in 2004 aged 70) and the gradual movement to novelty shops with appeal to the ever increasing tourist trade, the boutique trade founded in Carnaby Street in 1957 by Stephen is still visible through the many shops of that ilk that still exist. Although featured in many books about London, the only book published which is exclusively about Carnaby Street and traces the history from the 1600s to 1970 is simply entitled Carnaby Street and was written by Tom Salter in 1970.

== Cultural impact ==
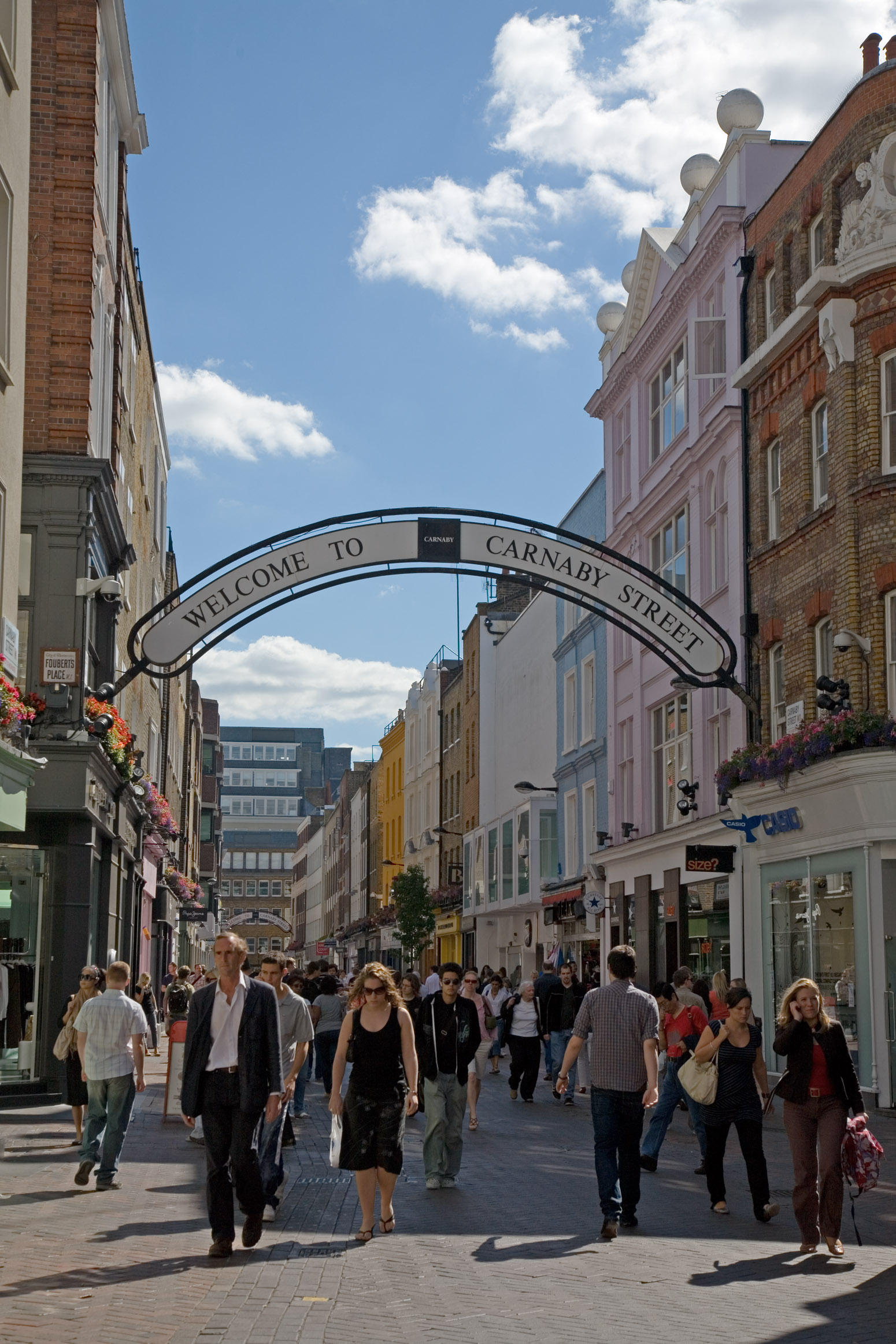
Carnaby Street in 2006

In 1966 Lady Jane, the first ladies' fashion boutique opened, creating a public sensation when they had models getting dressed in the window, bringing Carnaby Street to a standstill. This typified the relaxed sexual attitude the era brought about.

Carnaby Street was satirised by The Kinks in their 1966 hit, "Dedicated Follower of Fashion," which contains the line "Everywhere the Carnabetian Army marches on, each one a dedicated follower of fashion".

It was mentioned in the 1967 film Smashing Time. One of the songs, "Carnaby Street," features the lyric: "You'll pay for the gear on display to appear on the scene/ It's no good being mean/ They'll have your every bean."

In 1969, Peggy March recorded an album called In der Carnaby Street, with a hit song of the same name.

A song by The Jam, "Carnaby Street," was written by bassist Bruce Foxton. It was the B-side of single "All Around the World."

The song "We Are London" from the 2009 Madness album The Liberty of Norton Folgate mentions the street's reputation for fashion: "On Carnaby, you can still get the threads / If you wanna be a mod, a punk, a ted, or a suedehead."

Carnaby Street the Musical opened in 2013. The show is set in the 1960s.
