= Anglo-Japanese style =

Hybrid artistic style

Anglo-Japanese Style
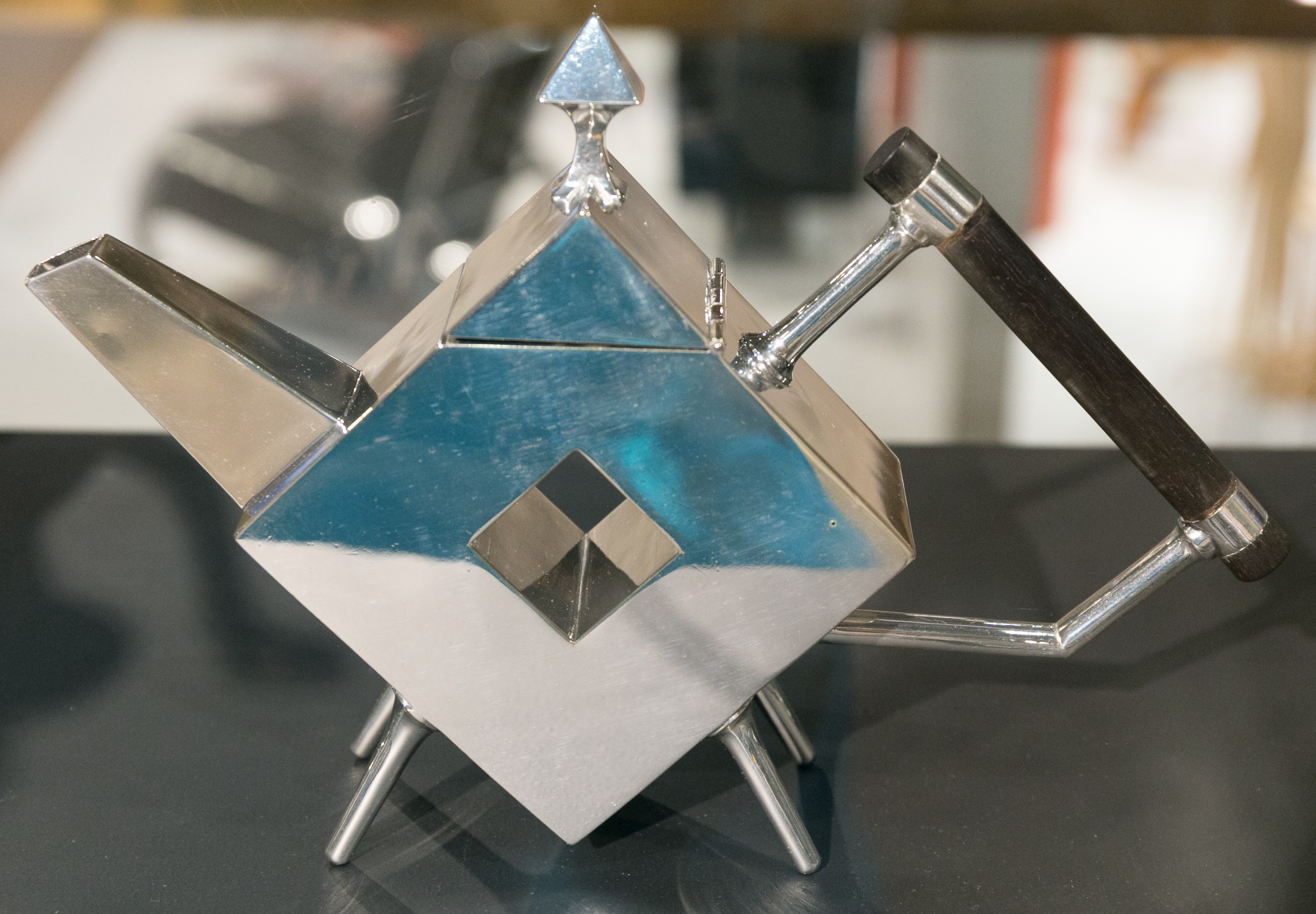
- Dresser Teapot (1879) inspired by watching Japanese Tea Ceremony in 1877
- Years active: 1850s–1910s
- Location: United Kingdom
- Major figures: Christopher Dresser, Edward William Godwin, Thomas Jeckyll, Arthur Lasenby Liberty, Arthur Silver
- Influences: Arts and Crafts; Yokohama Shashin; Ukiyo-e; Japanese art
- Influenced: Pre-Raphaelite Brotherhood, Mintons Pottery, Aestheticism, British Queen Anne Revival architecture, Modern Style & Studio pottery in England, Glasgow Boys in Scotland, Arts and Crafts movement and Eastlake Furniture in the United States; Liberty style in Italy

The Anglo-Japanese style developed in the United Kingdom through the Victorian era and early Edwardian era from approximately 1851 to the 1910s, when a new appreciation for Japanese design and culture influenced how designers and craftspeople made British art, especially the decorative arts and architecture of England, covering a vast array of art objects including ceramics, furniture and interior design. Important centres for design included London and Glasgow. The style was part of the wider European movement known as Japonisme.

The first use of the term "Anglo-Japanese" occurs in 1851, and developed due to the keen interest in Japan, which due to Japanese state policy until the 1860s, had been closed to the Western markets. The style was popularised by Edward William Godwin in the 1870s in England, with many artisans working in the style drawing upon Japan as a source of inspiration and designing pieces based on Japanese Art, whilst some favoured Japan simply for its commercial viability, particularly true after the 1880s when the British interest in Eastern design and culture is regarded as a characteristic of the Aesthetic Movement. By the 1890s–1910s further education occurred, and with the advent of bilateral trade and diplomatic relations, two-way channels between the UK and Japan occurred and the style morphed into one of cultural exchange and early modernism, diverging into the Modern Style, Liberty style and anticipated the minimalism of 20th-century modern design principles.

Notable British designers working in the Anglo-Japanese style include Christopher Dresser, Edward William Godwin, James Lamb, Philip Webb and the decorative arts wall painting of James Abbott McNeill Whistler. Further influence can be found in works from the Arts and Crafts movement; and in British designs in Scotland, seen in the works of Charles Rennie Mackintosh.

== Design principles ==
Design features such as fukinsei (不均斉, 'asymmetry') and wabi-sabi (侘寂, 'imperfection') and simplification of layout prominently feature as aesthetical importation and adaptation in many Anglo-Japanese designers works and pieces. Christopher Dresser, who was the first European designer to visit Japan in 1876, brought back and popularised many influential Japanese aesthetics in his books, Japan: Its Architecture, Art, and Art Manufactures (1882). The design principle shifted from one of first directly copying (practiced in Japonisme by figures like Van Gogh or Lautrec), to understanding the aesthetic principal behind Japanese art (practiced by Dresser and later Godwin), leading penultimately creating the new Anglo Japanese style. The impact of the shift in how design should be approached can be in seen in C. F. A. Voysey for his wallpaper at Liberty's, who felt that the underlying aesthetic of Japanese workmanship must first be understood to create an independent Anglo-Japanese work, and that to try to reproduce it when solely aesthetical purpose and outside tradition would pragmatically create superficial work. Speaking in 1917, comparing his abhorrence of the many poor contemporaneous imitations and 'traditional Japanese' works to 18th century English Chinoiserie Japanning furniture, he noted that although "we may fitly imitate in an object of our own, the finish we find in Japanese workmanship, but the imitation of its traditional thought and feeling is absurd, Chippendale exhibited this kind of [visual] absurdity when he produced his Chinese furniture".

=== Interior design ===
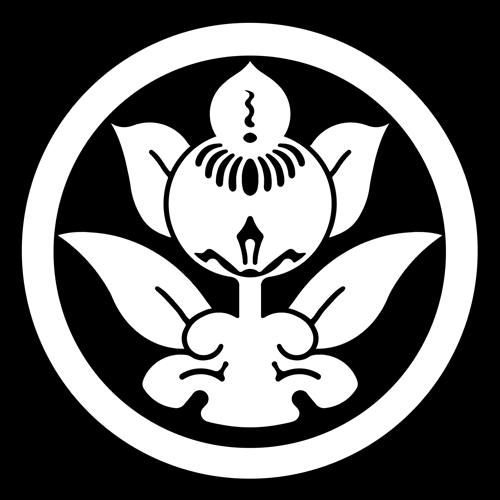
Example of a Mon

In the design of furniture, the most common and characteristic features are refined lines and nature motifs such as 'Mons', and most particularly an ebonized finish (or even ebony) echoing the well-known 'japanned' finish. Halen (p. 69) proposes an ebonized chair exhibited at the 1862 International Exhibition by A.F. Bornemann & Co of Bath, and described (and possibly designed) by Christopher Dresser as the quaint and unique Japanese character, to be the first documented piece of furniture in the Anglo-Japanese style. The types of furniture required in England such as wardrobes, sideboards and even dining-tables and easy-chairs did not have a Japanese precedent therefore Japanese principles and motifs had to be adapted to existing types in order to meet English requirements.

Dresser noted that the 'Mons' of Japanese Art also have their similarities in Celtic 'rudimentary art'.

=== Architecture ===
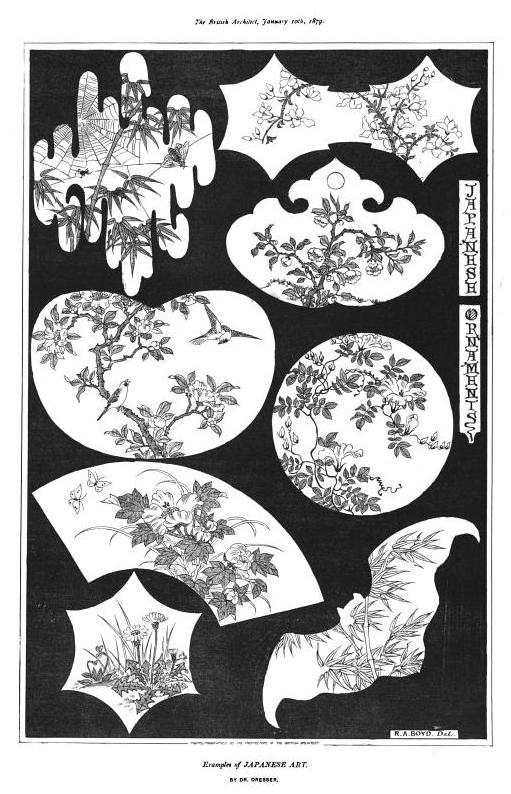
Dresser, 'Japanese Ornament' (1879)

Many British designers of the Victorian period were taught the Neo-Gothic design principles of John Ruskin and Owen Jones, principally the Grammar of Ornament (1856), which did not include Japan. 'Ornament' referring to an important aspect of English architectural decorative design for the period, deriving from the popular ornamentation at the time found on the exterior of European churches, and placing this beside nature. Yet by 1879, it was reported that ornamental gothic 'natural forms [had] all the nature flattened out of them, [being] arbitrarily and mechanically arranged', and thus for satisfactorily replacing the Ornament of Owen Jones, Japanese art had 'taught [the British architect] the lesson we wanted, in teaching us how to adapt natural forms without taking the nature out of them. Gothic art showed us something of this; but it did not show it so clearly, nor in so many ways, as Japanese [art has done]'; 'for even their copies are not slavishly mechanical but free ... [shown in] how the Japanese can introduce into a panel something of pictorial expression without loss of decorative simplicity.'

=== Pottery and porcelain ===
When designing pottery and ceramics, early influences on the style came from 'japonaiserie' influence and early influences show how Dresser working with Minton's incorporated the superficial exterior of Japanese pottery techniques and colour in porcelain, but not its design principles or aesthetical practices. Dresser turned to designing a number of direct Japanese-influenced pieces such as his wave ceramic (pictured in gallery), and later drew from the direct influence of Japanese aesthetics, which he took from his time learning from artisans in his visit to the country in the 1870s. This in turn became in the 1880–1889 period known as 'Art Pottery', under the Aesthetic branch of the style, and was practiced by a number of other potters and ceramicists, particularly stoneware pots. Common motifs included prunus blossom, pine branches, storks and roundels.

=== Metalwork ===
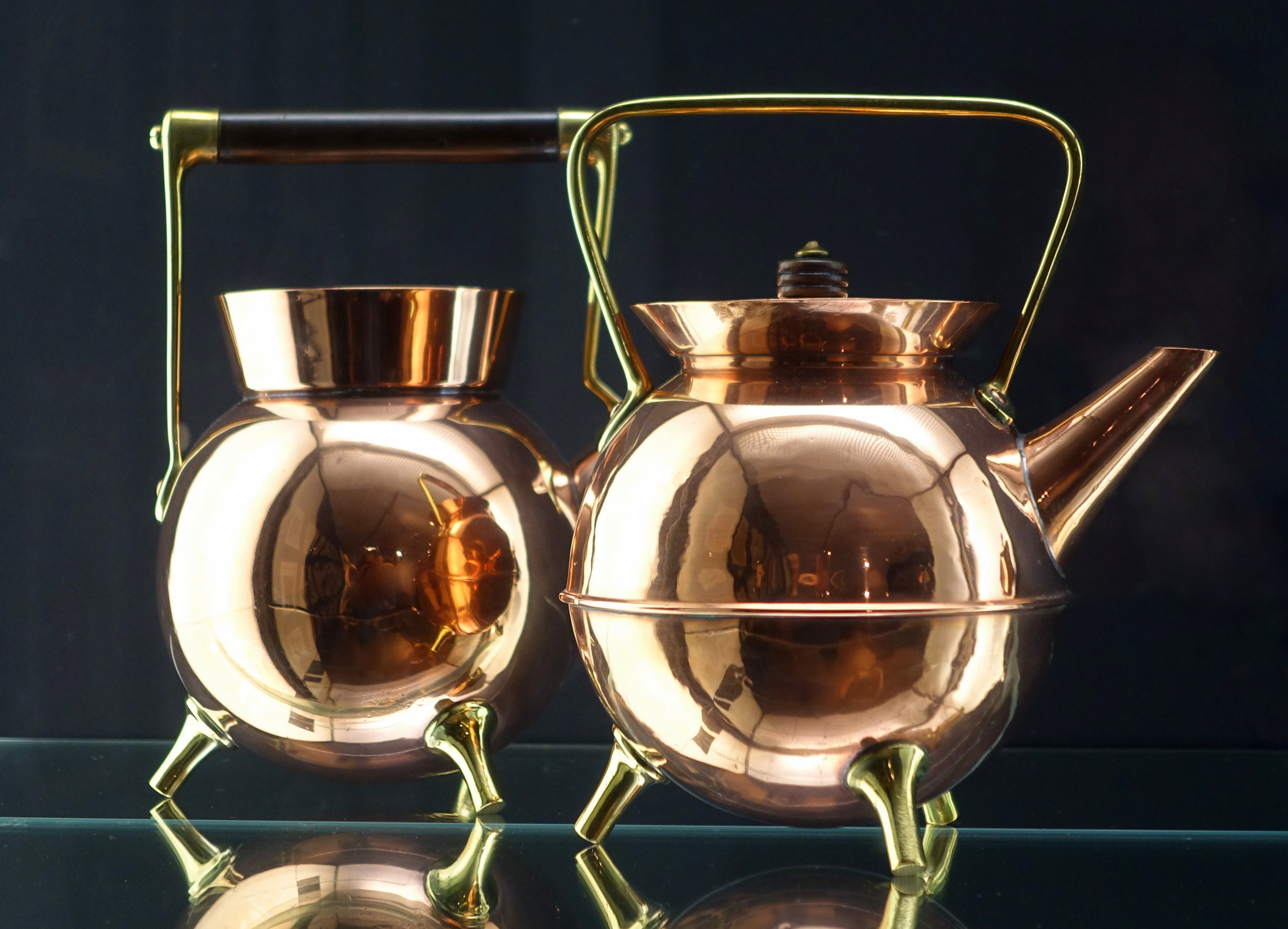
Dresser Brass-Copper Tea kettles (1885)

Metalwork in the 1880s also drew from a blend of 'Gothic Revival, naturalism and a Western interpretation of the arts of Japan'.

=== Furniture ===
Many Anglo-Japanese pieces of furniture were made, but the furniture designed by Godwin for William Watt is the most definitive of its kind. Godwin never travelled to Japan, but collected Japanese art objects circa 1863, and designed his furniture based on replicating adapted forms from these objects, creating a distinctive English style of Japanese inspired furniture in the 1870s, dubbing it the 'Anglo-Japanese Style'. Japanese illustration, woodblock prints, Japanese family crests and the Manga series inspired many of his furniture designs 'curved lintels and geometric grille patterns'. Furniture in Godwin's image was refined, sparse of ornament and asymmetrical in its design, often in ebonized woods with simple decoration using Japanese paper or minute wood carved detailing. In the White House in Chelsea, he organised the furniture to be distributed asymmetrically, and the walls to covered in gold leaf inspired by Japanese design and interiors.

== England ==
Whilst Japanese trade with England had first commenced in 1613–1623, under the policy of Sakoku the import and export market of Japan had been limited to smuggled contraband and was only available once again 150 years later when the Ansei Treaties opened Japan to British trade once more, after the opening of Japan in 1853.

=== 1850–1859: Early exchange ===
The Museum of Ornamental Art, later the Victoria and Albert Museum, bought Japanese lacquer and porcelain in 1852, and again in 1854 with the purchase of 37 items from the exhibition at the Old Water-Colour Society, London. Japanese art was exhibited in London in 1851, Dublin in 1853; Edinburgh 1856 and 1857; Manchester in 1857, and Bristol in 1861.

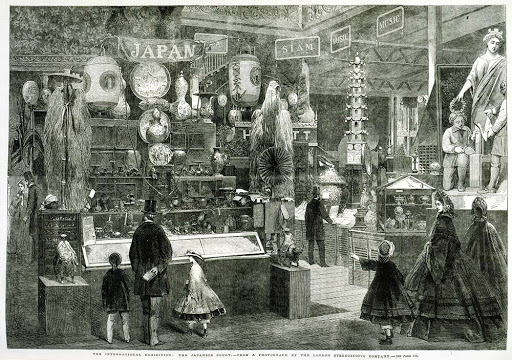
Japan 1862 International Exhibition

In 1858, a 'series of roller printed cottons' with direct Japanese influence were made by Daniel Lee of Manchester.

=== 1860–1869: Import influx ===
With Rutherford Alcock also organising the unofficial Japan Booth, the 1862 International Exhibition in London displayed a number of everyday objects; the impact of which has been considered 'one of the most influential events in the history of Japanese art in the West', introducing people such as Christopher Dresser to Japanese Art. Early examples of Japanese influence and inspiration in ceramics were noted by Dresser in his reviews of the International Exhibition, London 1862, where he remarked on Minton's 'vases enriched with Chinese or Japanese ornament', and in his purchasing and sketching of the goods at the exhibition.

Alcock noted that of the 1862 exhibition: "I occupied myself in collecting, for the gratification of the cultured and the instruction of the working and industrial classes of England, evidence of what Art had done for the Japanese and their industries".

When the exhibit closed, interest began around Japanese objects and Japan itself, and collectors, artists and merchants such as Arthur Lasenby Liberty and Farmers and Rogers Oriental Warehouse began to collect Japanese art and objects. With the opening of the treaty ports in Japan, four Japanese cities began exporting goods to the United Kingdom. Most of these items eventually began to influence the art of British artisans and enter the home of British elites. A number of artists from the Pre-Raphaelite circle such as Dante Gabriel Rossetti, Ford Madox Brown (Rossetti's friend), Edward Burne-Jones and Simeon Solomon also was beginning to use Oriental influences in their works; Albert Joseph Moore and James McNeill Whistler also began to frequent the warehouse importing these goods in London. Architect Edward William Godwin also designed his home and bought ukiyo-e in 1862 to decorate his home; William Eden Nesfield also designed early pieces in the style.

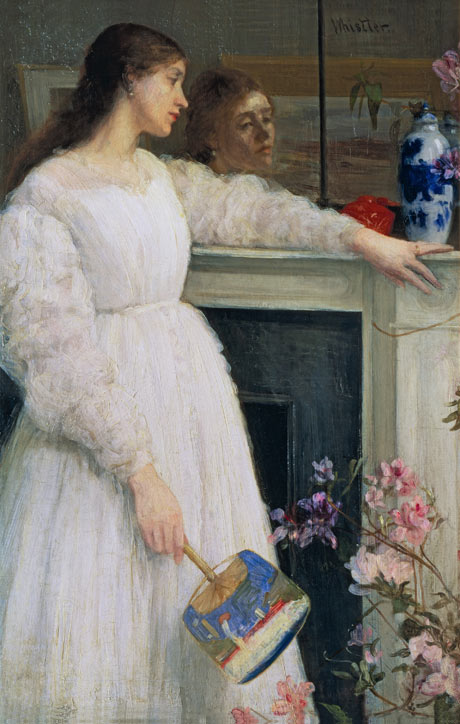
Whistler 1864

In 1863 John Leighton (artist) gave a lecture on 'Japanese art' to the Royal Society and Alcock gave another at the Leeds Philosophical Society in the same year. The rise of Yokohama Shashin (Yokohama photography) from early photographers such as Felice Beato also introduced the pictorial arts to Britain, and alongside the imports of new woodblock prints, became fashionable objects to own and discuss in artistic and academic circles.

Glassware was also influenced by Japanese art and the 'Frog decanter' exhibited by Thomas Webb at the International Exhibition in Paris 1867 is in its subject, simplicity and asymmetry the earliest example of Japanese influence on English glass identified to date.

Certainly by 1867, Edward William Godwin and Christopher Dresser had become aware of Japanese art objects, particularly Japanese woodblock printing styles, forms and colour schemes. Further interest was taken by the British government on the collection of Washi paper for the V&A when the like was collected on masse for exhibition in London, collected by Harry Parkes between 1867 and 1868.

Influenced by Whistler and a love of historical painting styles, Moore blended the aesthetical vernacular of Greek and Japanese using the Art for Art's sake Japanese decorative and aesthetical style, seen in Moore's 1868 painting Azaleas, which 'reconciled the arts of Japan and Greece, and the aesthetic and classical, in a new Victorian combination'. Whilst Whistler certainly influenced the popularity of Japanese art, he often butted heads with other collectors on Japanese art, frequently butting heads with the Rosetti Brothers on the collection of Ukiyo-e and Japanese woodblock prints. Dante saw the refinement of line in Japanese arts as having "nothing to ask of European attainment or models; it is an integral organism ... [being in its accuracy and finesse] more instinctive than the artists of other races." Whereas Whistler drew on the French ideal of l'art pour l'art, and that Japanese art d'object where simply there with 'no social message, no commitment, no reason to exist except to be beautiful'.

By 1869, Godwin, not only having involved living with Japanese intereriors in his home in Harpenden with Ellen Terry, had begun to design in the early incarnation of Anglo-Japanese design at Dromore Castle in Limerick, Ireland in the Gothic and Japanese style.

Whistler, La Princesse du pays de la porcelaine (1863–1865), an example of the Art for art's sake style

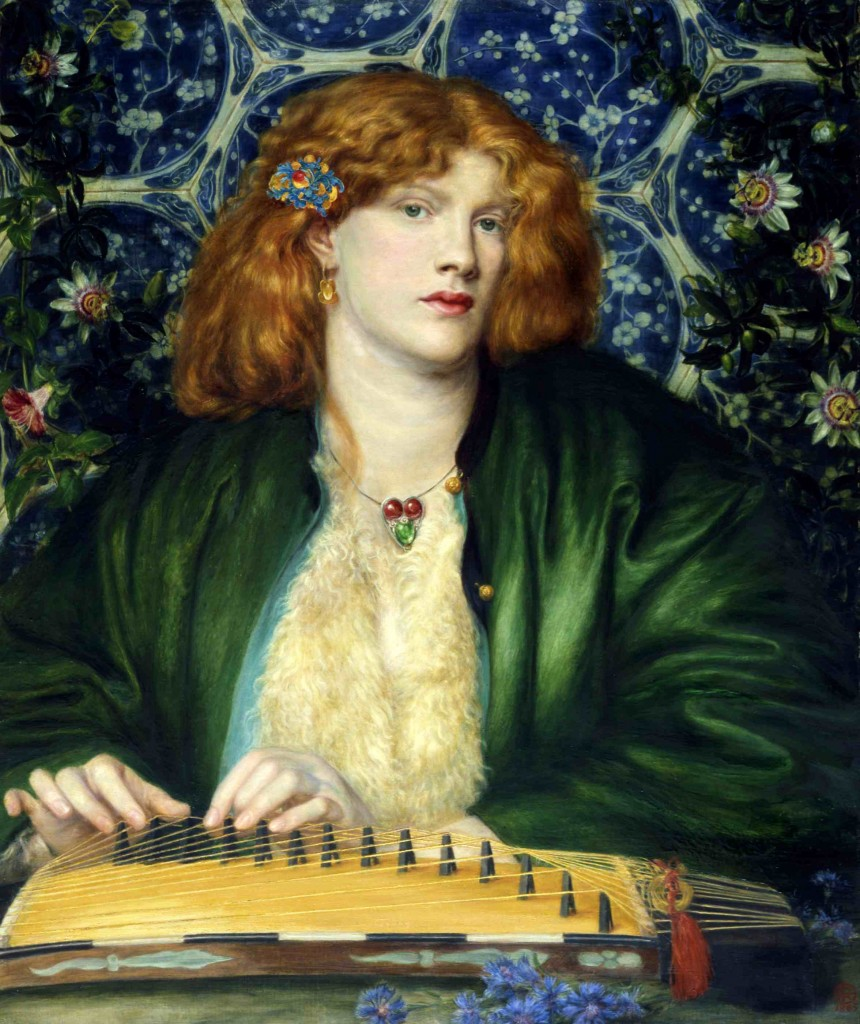
Rossetti, The Blue Bower (1865), sitter holds a Koto

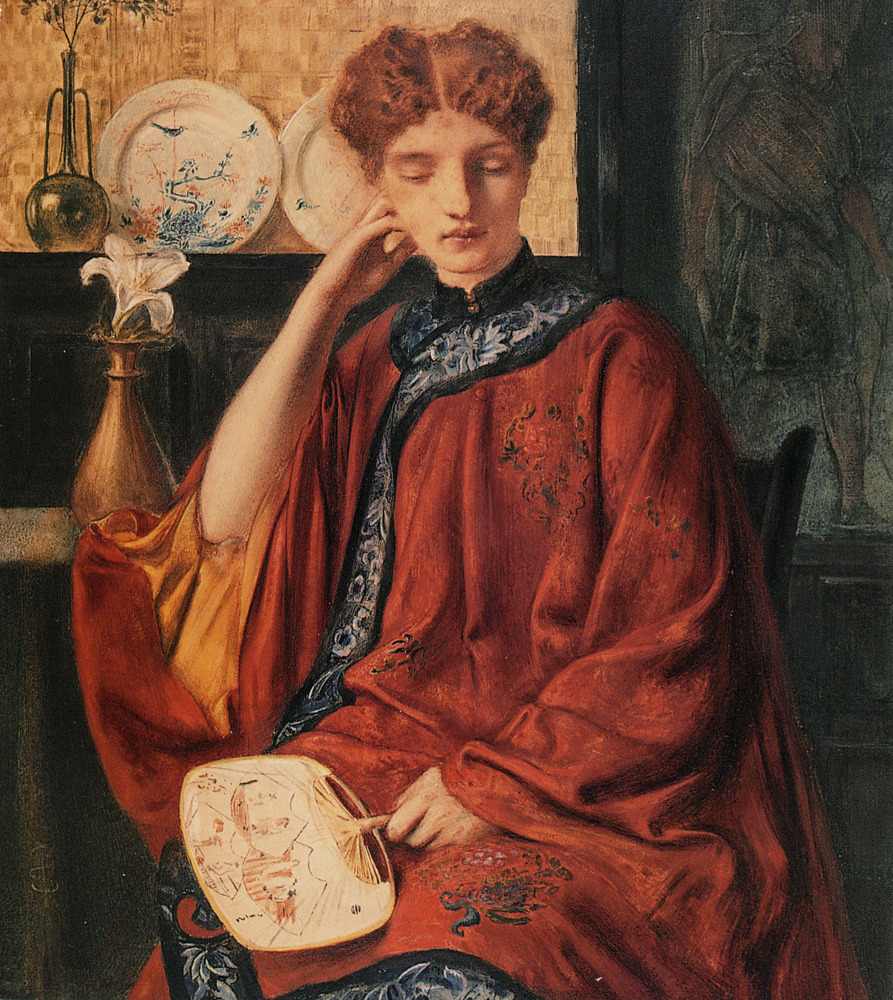
Solomon, The Japanese Fan (1865)

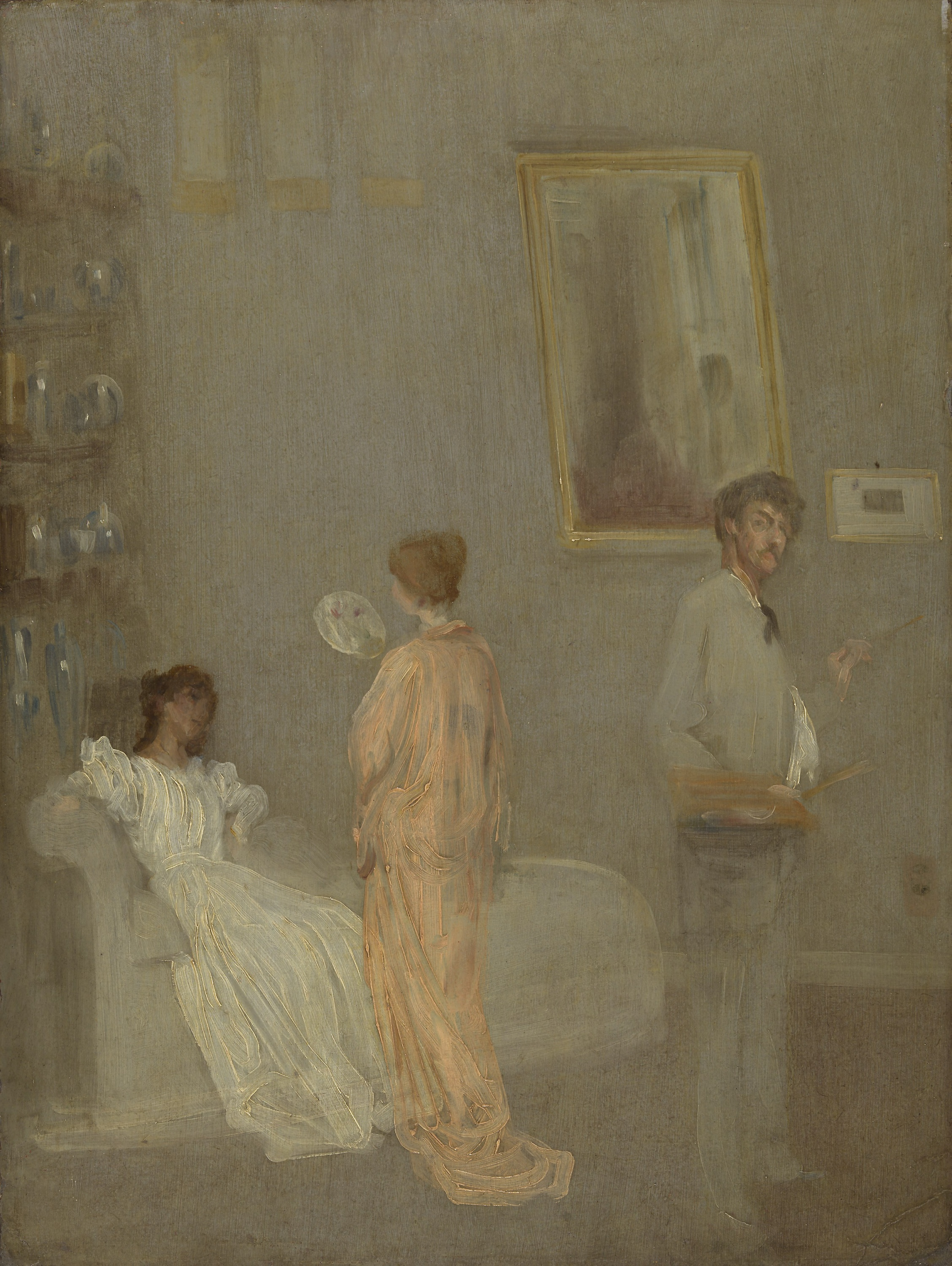
Whistler's London Studio (1865)

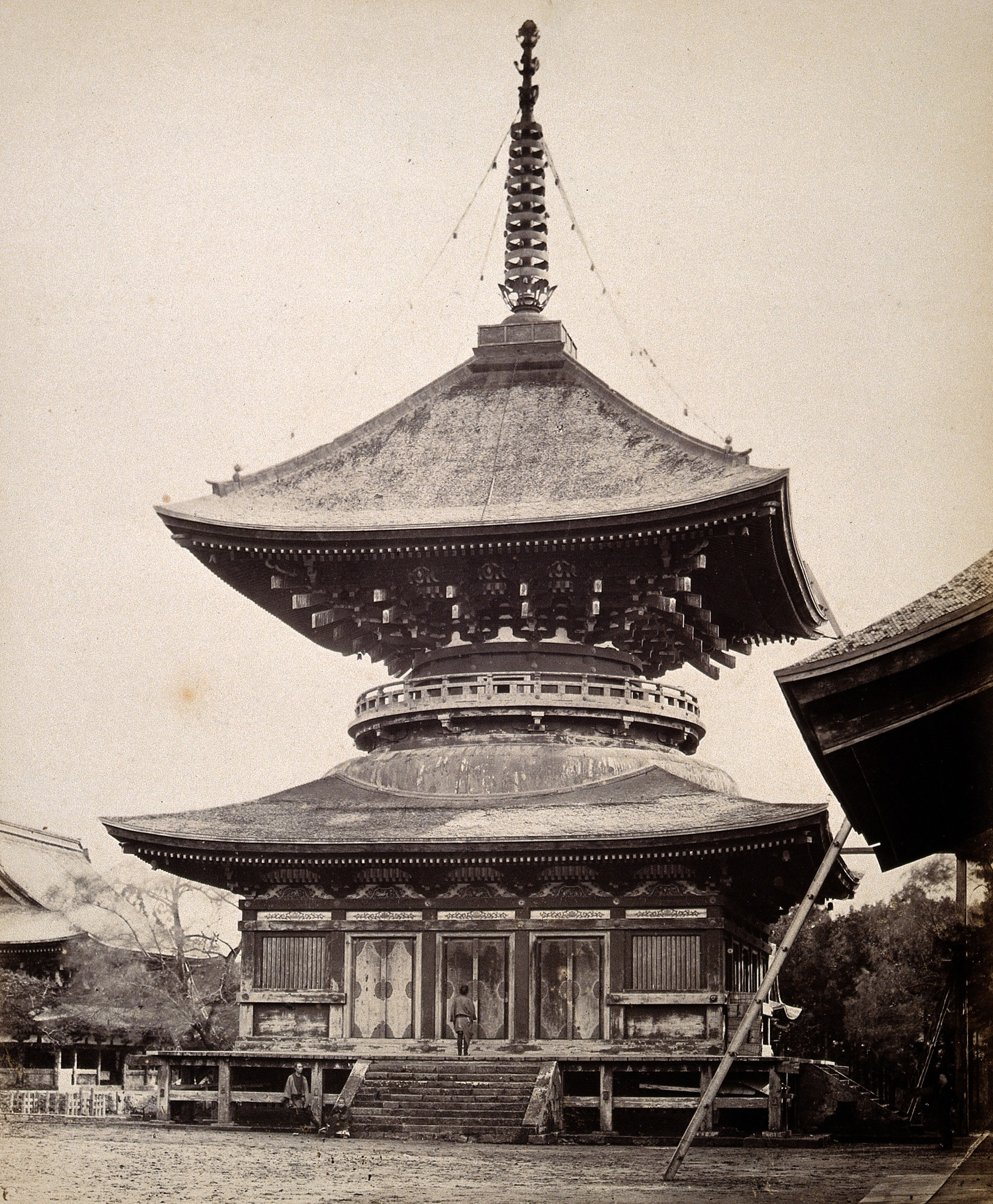
Beato and Kerr, Example of Yokohama Shashin (c. 1866)

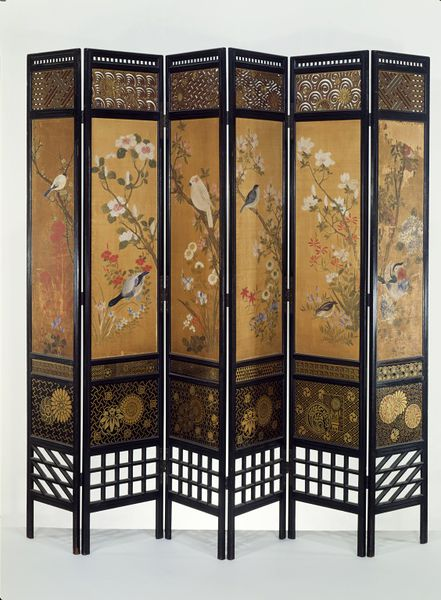
Nesfield Japanese Screen (1867)

=== 1870–1879: Influence and imitation ===
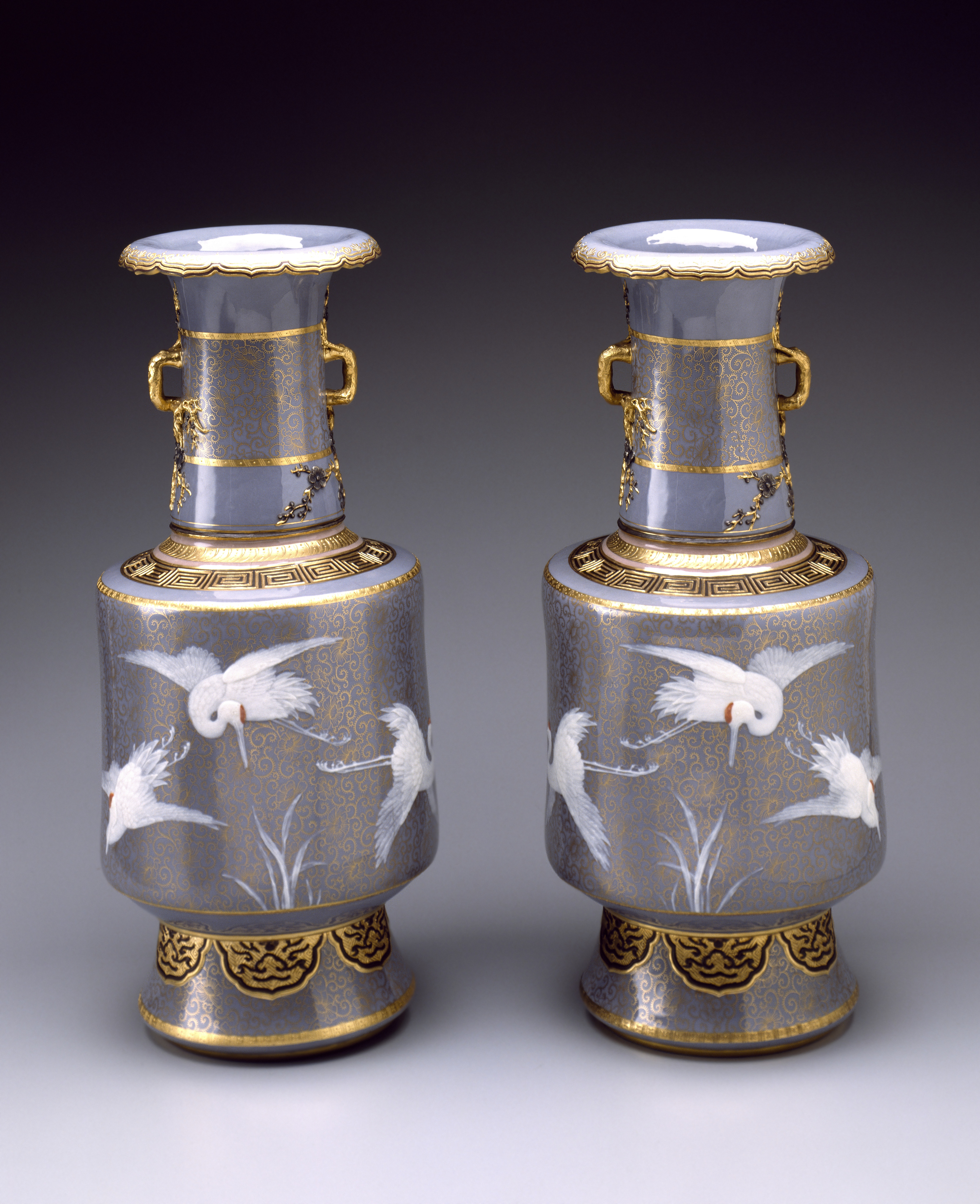
Minton Vase (c.1871–75)

Early in the decade, the Watcombe pottery in Devon produced unglazed terracotta wares, some of which rely entirely on Japanese forms and the natural colour of the clay for their ornamental effect. Japanese inspired porcelains by the Worcester porcelain factory at a similar date were much admired by the Japanese themselves. In 1870, Japanese pottery began to influence British ceramics, the potter Hannah Barlow made a number of animal designs, omitting heavy ornamentation/decorative foliage common in Victorian pottery, on clay during her time at Royal Doulton, inspired by Ukiyo-e. Dresser had a successful line with Minton of blue closionne vases. In 1873, George Ashdown Audsley gave a lecture on Japanese Ceramic artworks at Liverpool. Thomas Jeckyll designed a number of his 'mon' fireplaces, used by architects like Dresser and Norman Shaw, becoming extremely popular in 1873. Jeckyll also designed the Philadelphia Centennial Exposition's 1876 Japanese Pavilion in wrought iron, the decorative motif here of the sunflower was heavily employed in the structures ornament, which although used before as a motif by Jeckyll, popularised the association of the sunflower as a floral motif in the Anglo-Japanese style. Other artists such as Walter Crane, particularly his The Frog Prince (1874), began to display signs of Japanese influence in how they employ the bright colours of Japanese woodblock prints he had first used in other children series (between 1869 and 1875) which he had first been introduced to in his time in art school in England.

Japan took part in the 1874 International Exhibition. In 1874–1876, Warner & Sons produced a number of successful wallpapers, designed by Edward William Godwin, heavily featuring circular 'mons', and chrysanthemum motifs, the mons being directly taken from Japanese design, found in a book; owned by Godwin's wife; Beatrice Godwin. As well by 1874, Japanese imports had also picked up and Arthur Lasenby Liberty became well known as a Japanese goods importer at his store Liberty's (or for example 'small silver hinged boxes cloisonne-enamelled in an Anglo-Japanese style'), particularly for ladies fan in 1875. In the same year, Thomas Edward Collcutt began designing a number of Japanese inspired ebonized sideboards, cabinets and chairs for Collinson & Lock. Augustus Wollaston Franks set up an exhibition of ceramics, mainly porcelain, at the Bethnal Green Museum in 1876; having collected netsuke and tsuba from Japan. Godwin in the British Architect reported that Liberty's [has] Japanese papers for the walls; curtain stuffs for windows and doors; folding screens, chairs, stools [etc. ... Sometimes] one stumbles across a rug that is irritating in its sheer violence of colour. Such coarseness, however, is rarely or ever to be found even in the modern products of Japan. ... Either the European market is ruining Japanese art, or the Japanese have taken our artistic measure and found it wanting; perhaps there is a little of both. Godwin was commenting on the increase in Japanese goods both original and made for the European market at the time. Stencilled mulberry wallpapers, fabrics made and imported with tussore silk on a wider loom by Liberty and Thomas Wardle alongside other Japanese imports were also said to be being sold by this time in London at William Whiteley's, Debenham and Freebody and Swan & Edgar. The imported silks were incredibly popular with painters like Moore who preferred their use in drapery on artists-models.

In 1877, Godwin designed the white house for Whistler in Chelsea. He also made his William Watt Anglo Japanese Style furniture, and his Japanese Mon inspired wallpapers. Thomas Jeckyll also then designed the Peacock Room for the shipping magnate Frederick Richards Leyland; and these types of Japanese ornamentation can also be found in the design of his fireplaces. The Grosvenor Gallery opens; showcasing Whistler's Black Nocturne leading to the infamous dispute with Ruskin over the worth of an artwork. In 1878, Daniel Cottier finished a series of stained glass window panels Morning Glories which detail 'a lattice fence ... which adapt from a variety of Japanese ... screens, textile stencils, manga and ukiyo-e prints'. Indeed, Cottier (a Glaswegian who worked in London and New York City) had his Studio and shop full of Aesthetic and Anglo-Japanese ebonised-wood furniture, his Studio producing through his apprentice Stephen Adam until the 1880s a number of Japanese decorative carpentry pieces, frequently using dark woods and gold floral Chrysanthemum accents, all popular Japanese motifs amongst westerners produced for the Western markets. Alcock also published his Art and Art Industries in Japan in 1878.

In 1879, Dresser was in partnership with Charles Holme (1848–1923) as Dresser & Holme, wholesale importers of Oriental goods, with a warehouse at 7 Farringdon Road, London. Collectors such as the Liverpool magnate James Lord Bowes began collecting Japanese goods. James Lamb (cabinetmaker) and Henry Ogden & Sons also began making Anglo-Japanese furniture for the western market such as hanging cabinets and tables and chairs. With some pottery produced at the Linthorpe Pottery, founded in 1879, closely followed Japanese examples in simple forms and especially in rich ceramic glaze effects quite revolutionary in the English market. In commercial mass-produced tablewares, the style was most represented by transfer prints depicting Japanese botanical or animal motifs such as bamboos, and birds; scenes of Japan or Japanese objects such as fans. Often these were placed in a novel asymmetrical fashion in defiance of Western tradition. Other potters who designed in the style included Martin Brothers from 1879 until 1904, with many of their works mostly decorative stoneware, heavily reliant on the principle of fish and floral motifs and some glazes in their later works. Aesthetic painters included William Stephen Coleman, Henry Stacy Marks, Edward Burne-Jones and Jean-Charles Cazin. Aesthetic artist who drew from the style frequently used imagery such as Peacocks, and came to be known by their artistic peers as belonging to the 'Cult of Japan'.

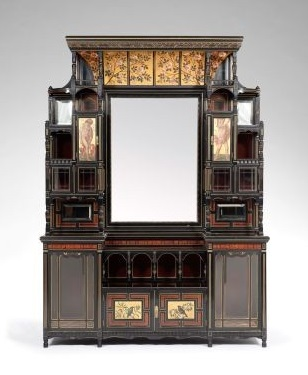
Cottier Cabinet

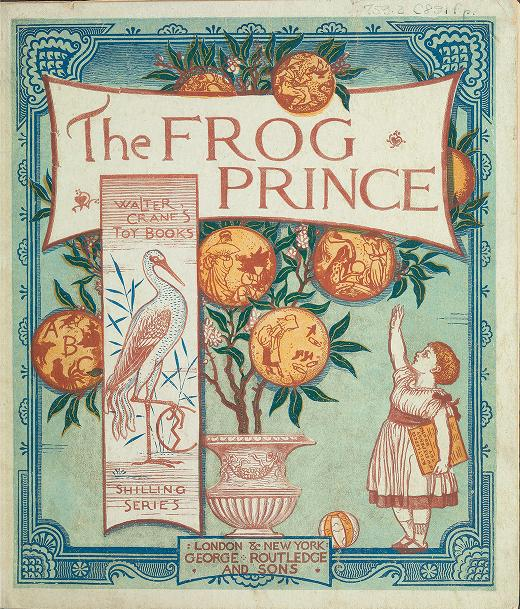
Crane, The Frog Prince (1874)

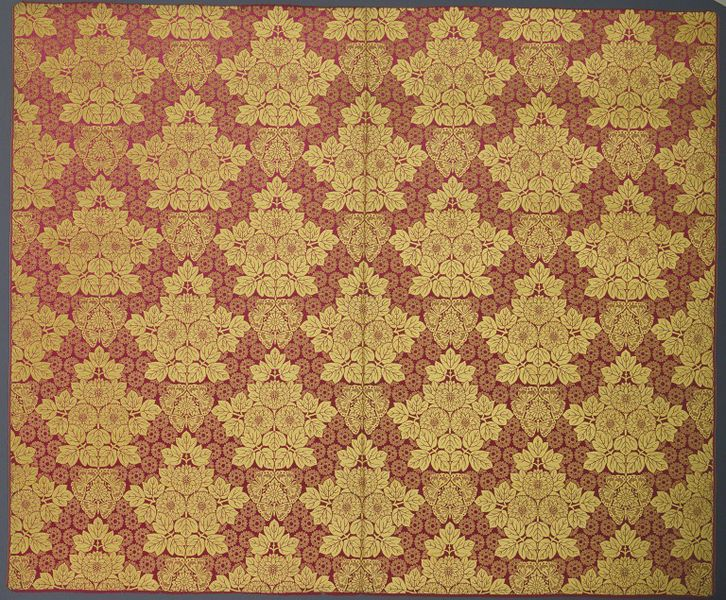
Godwin Anglo-Japanese Wallpaper (c. 1874)

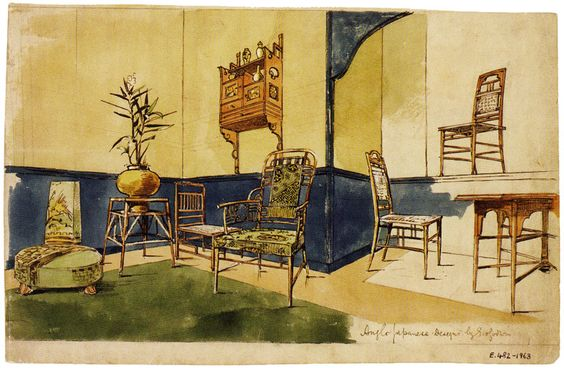
Godwin, Anglo Japanese Furniture (1875)

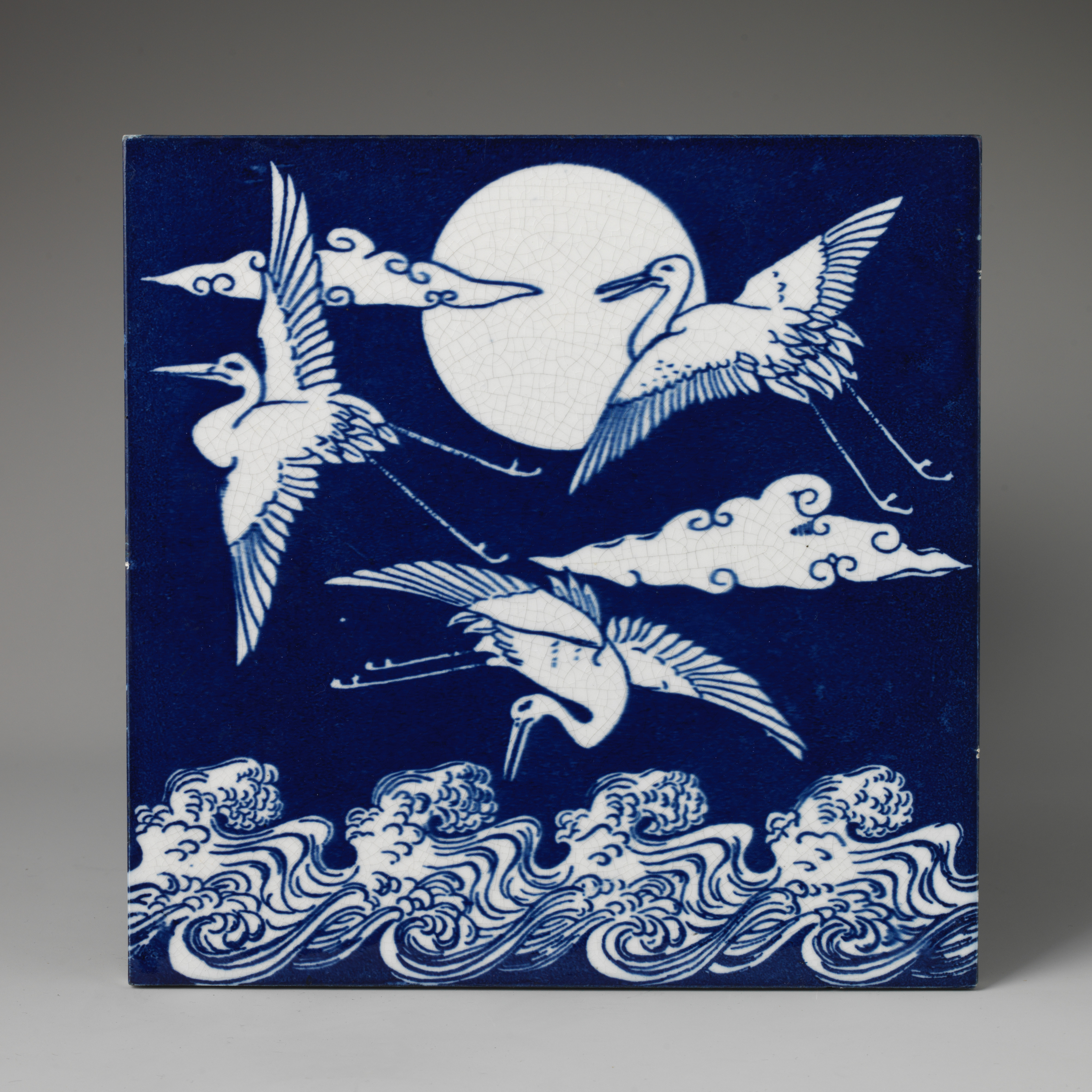
Dresser, Staffordshire Ceramic tile (c. 1875)

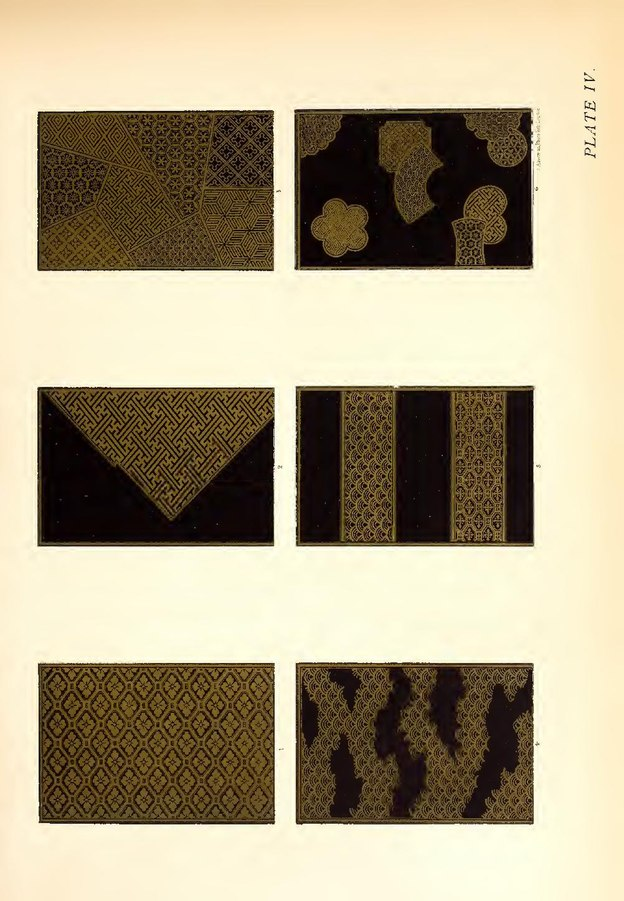
Bowes, Keramic art of Japan Plate IV (1875)

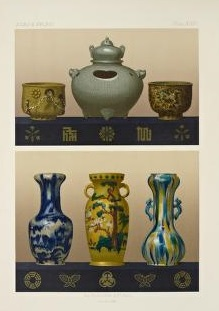
Bowes, Awagi Keramic Ware (1875)

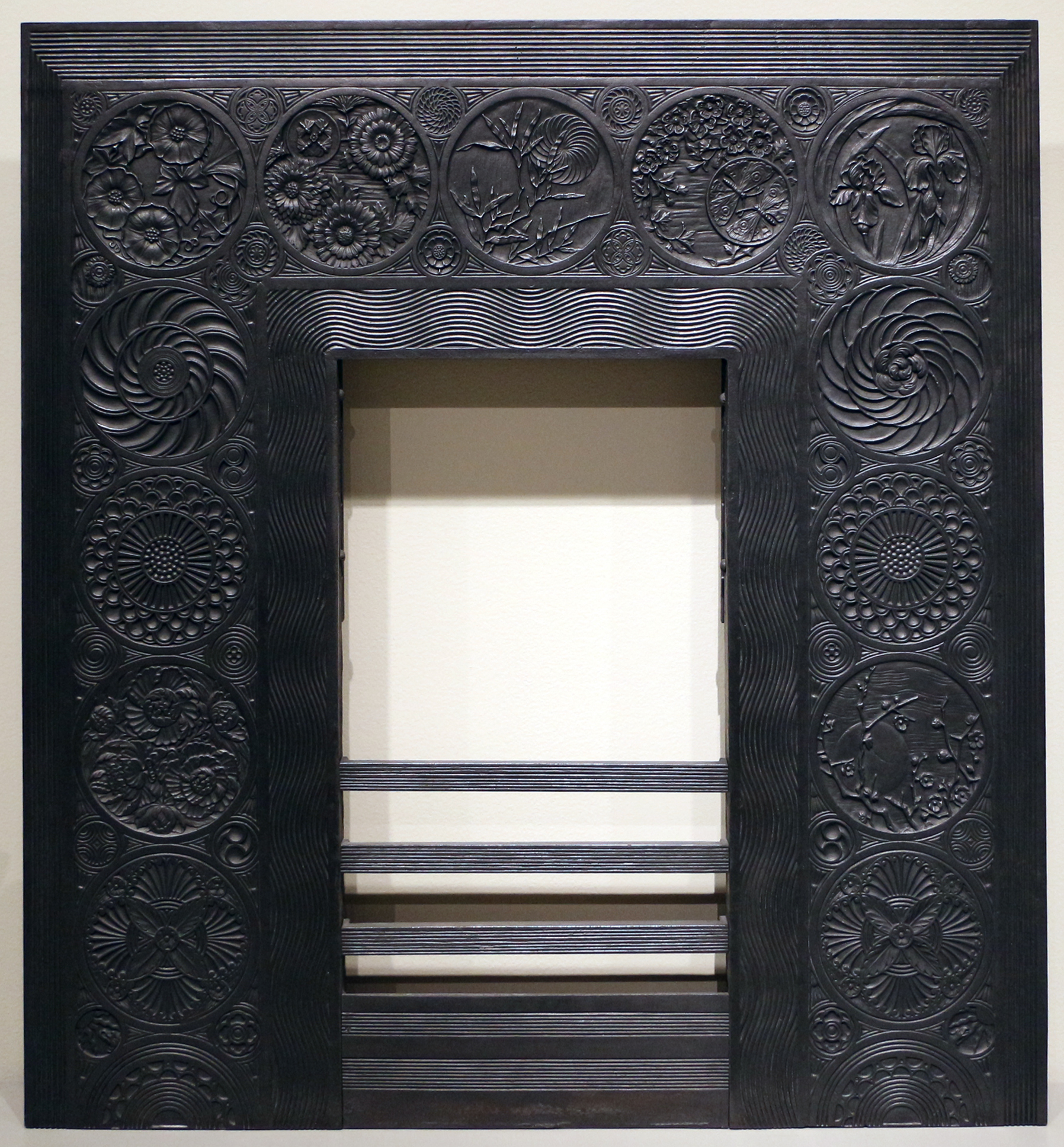
Jeckyll Mon Fireplace for Barnard, Bishop & Barnards (1875)

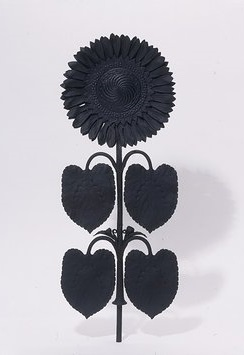
Jeckyll, Sunflower railing for the Japanese Pavilion (1876)

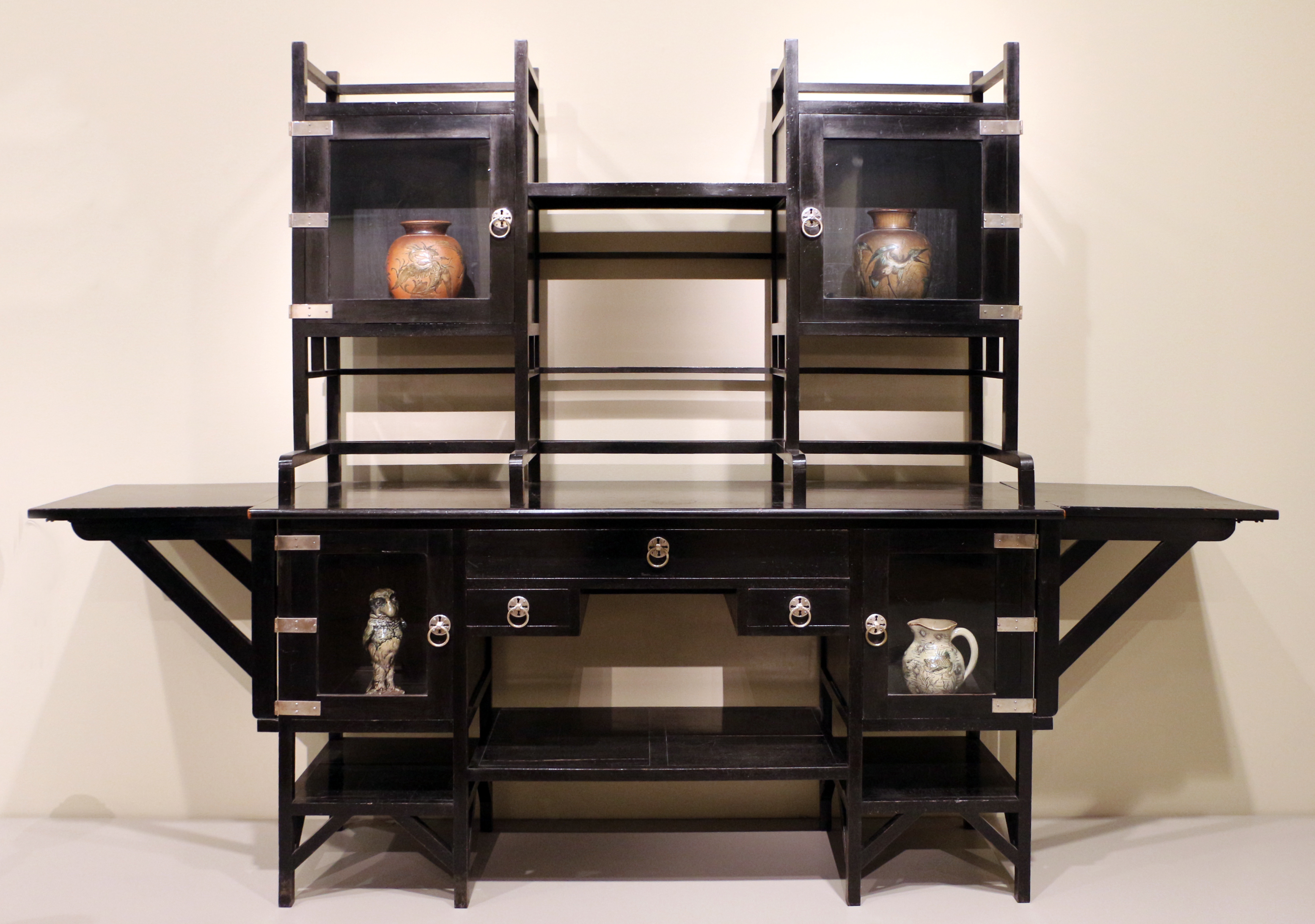
Edward William Godwin, Sideboard for William Watt (1876)

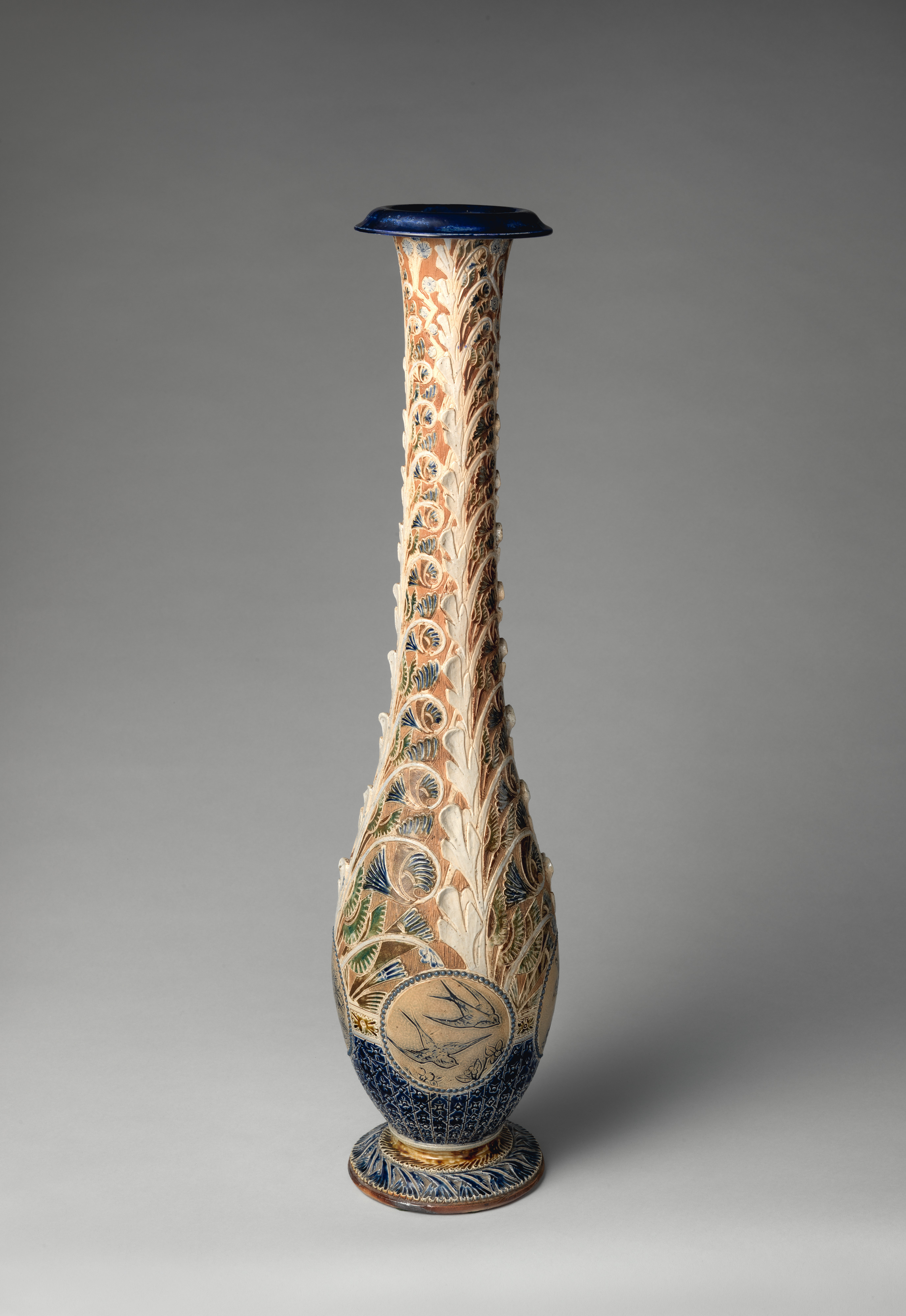
Martin Brothers, Japanese bird motif Vase (1876)

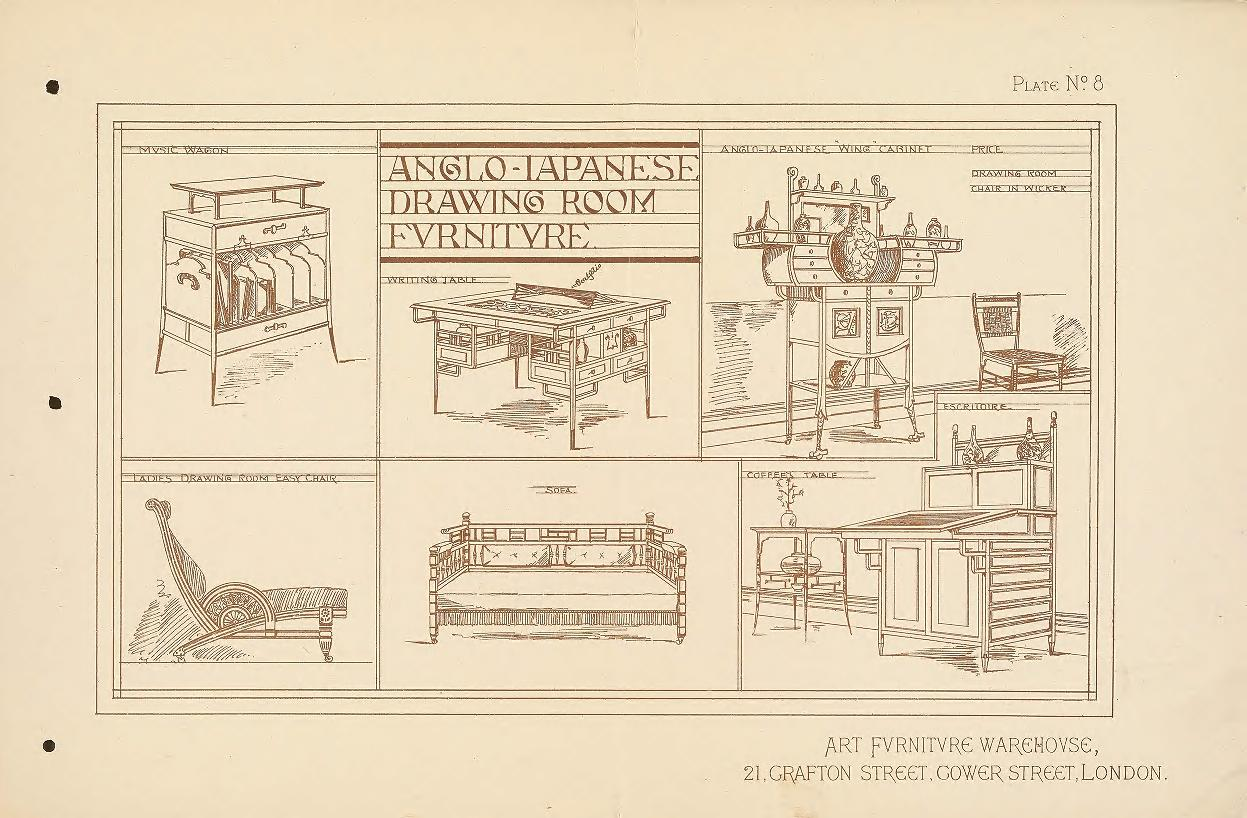
Godwin, Art Furniture (1877)

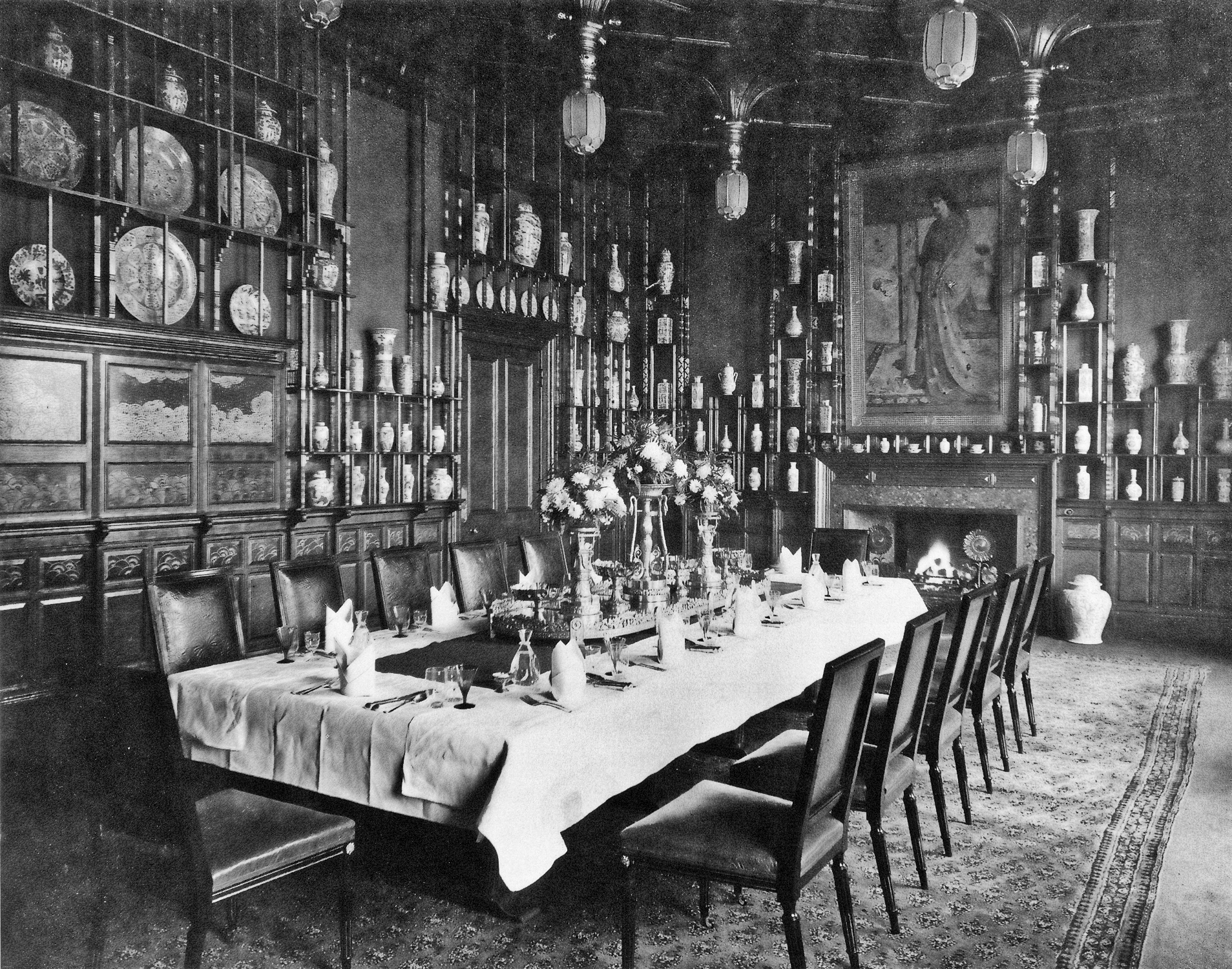
Peacock Room (1877; image taken in 1890)

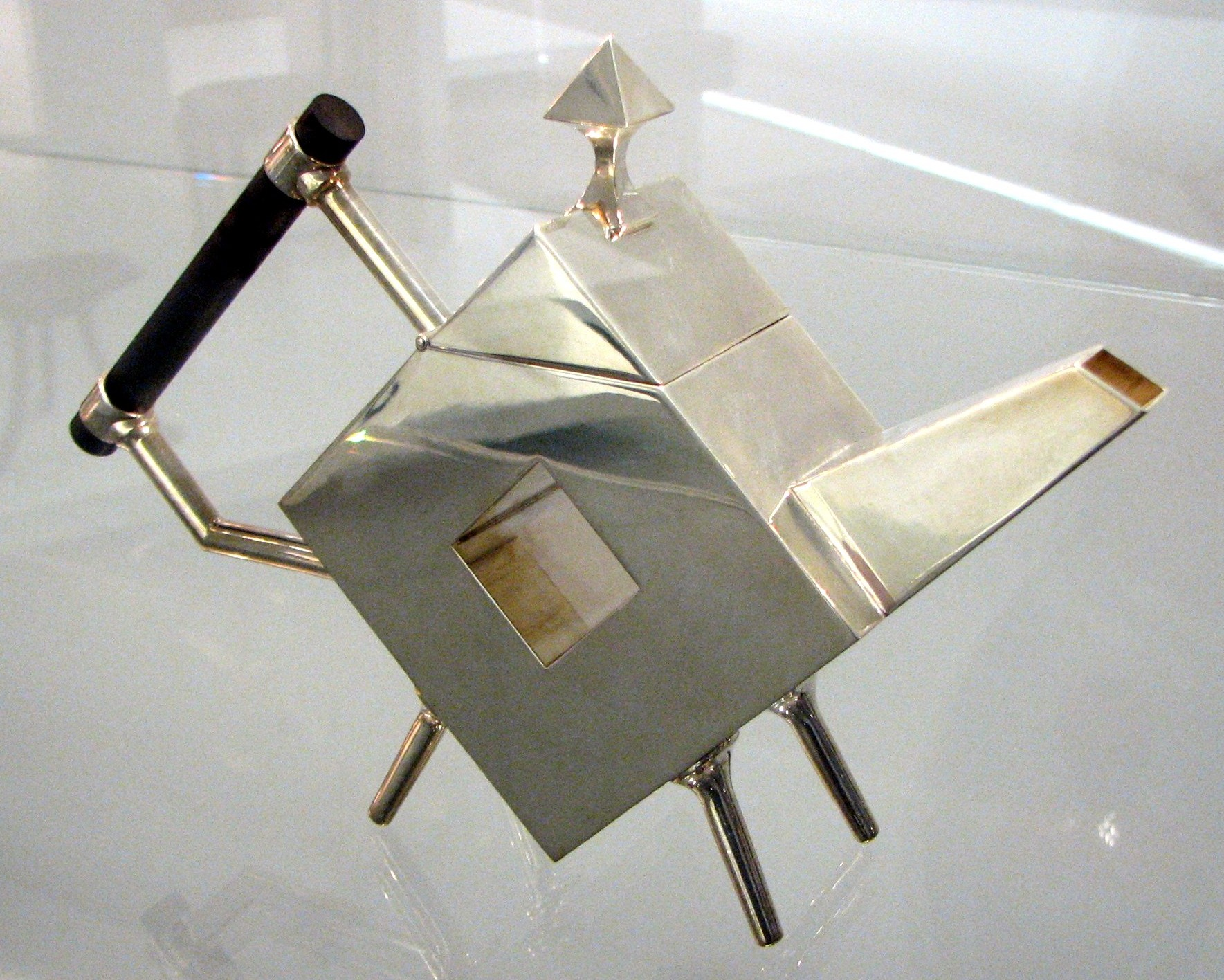
Dresser, Teapot, (1879)

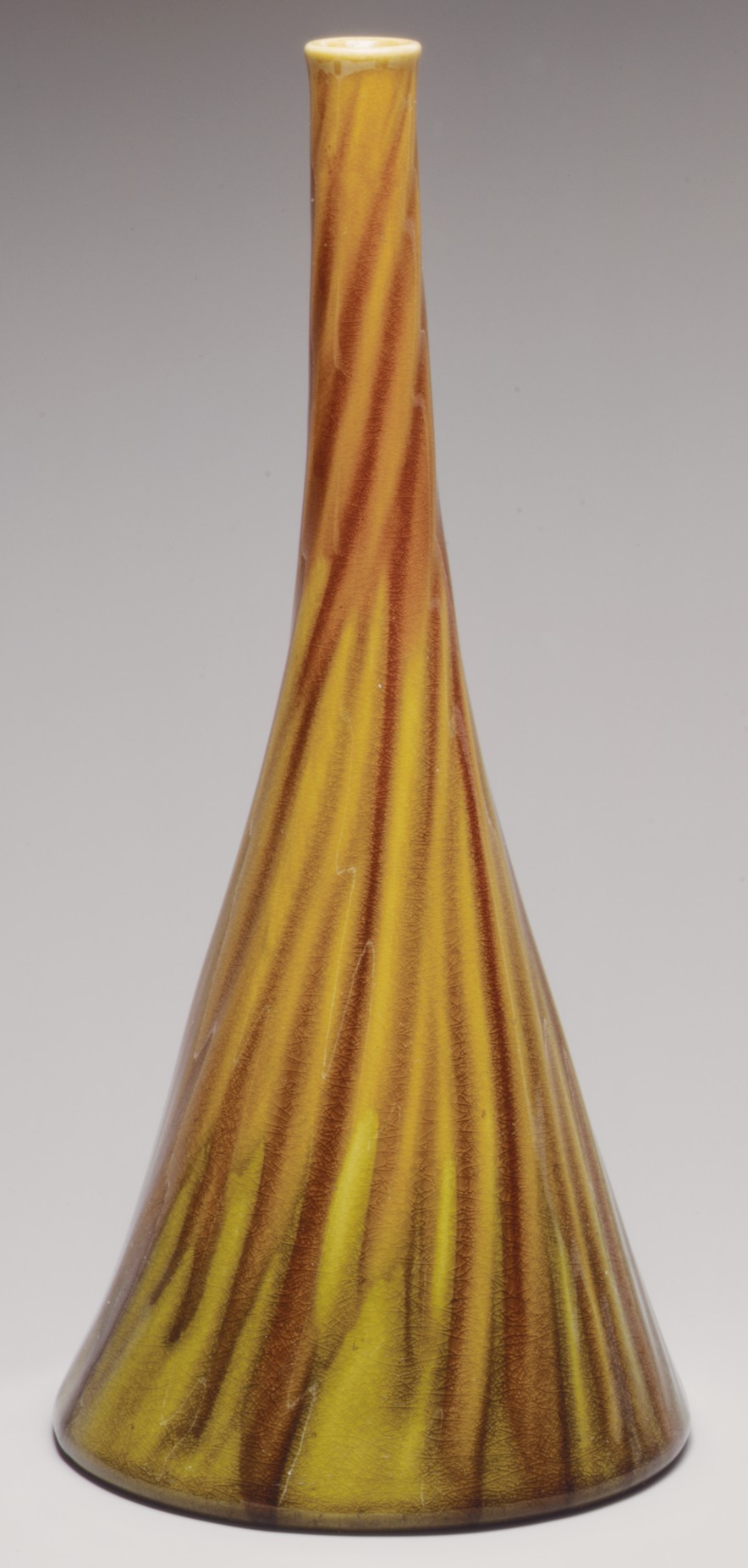
Dresser, Linthorpe Art Pottery Vase (1879–1882)

=== 1880–1889: Aesthetic art ===
By the 1880s, the style had become a major influence on the art and decoration of the time, particularly Aestheticism. When the aesthetes began to incorporate Japanese styles into their movement, they took on common motifs such as the sunflower, butterfly, peacock and Japanese fan. Particularly in 1880, Bruce James Talbert produced a number of ebonised Anglo-Japanese siedeboards and chairs using the sunflower motif throughout. He also produced a number of aesthetical wallpapers in the style for Warner and Ramm, notably 'characteristic [using] Japanese simplicity of line and colour' drawn from the aesthetical practices taught in the works of Dresser and Godwin. Another popular fabric employed in the Aesthetics were the tussore silks of 'Liberty Colours'. As aestheticism began to grow more popular, designers found the 'cult of personality, particularly when it involved creators of art, fundamentally conflicted with Ruskin's and Morris's emphasis upon the importance of traditional craftsman and artisans.' Liberty in particular, who sided with the ideals of William Morris; rejected early aestheticism, reflected later in what became the Liberty style.

Frederick William Sutton, an early Collodion photographer who had travelled to Japan in 1868 with the Royal Navy, gave eight lectures (between 1879 and 1883) on the new art form of photography in Japan. These lectures showcased early photographs and travel in Japan and in his sixth lecture, identified the concepts of 'Old and New Japan', a Victorian Ideal which divided the Meiji period into the time before Western contact and afterwards; Old Japan denoting an idealized, rural notion of the country from a time before the Meiji Restoration and New Japan being the industrial, westerner-tolerant Japan.

Stevens & Williams then in 1884 began to make their 'Matsu-no-Kee' decorative glass and fairy bowls, which took on the simplified nature so prominent amongst the Anglo-Japanese style and from the bright colour schemes seen in contemporary woodblock prints. Arthur Heygate Mackmurdo also began designing furniture inspired by Ikebana, as was noted further by many periodicals in the time on the subject of Japanese flower arrangement.

In 1887, Charles Holmes founder of The Studio Magazine, travels to Japan with Arthur Liberty. In the same year, Mortimer Menpes also presents his first Japanese inspired exhibition in London; rousing the ire of Whistler.

Alfred East is commissioned by the Fine Art Society to paint in Japan for six months in 1888, and Frank Morley Fletcher becomes introduced to Japanese woodcuts, helping through the next 22 years to teach about them in London and Reading, Yorkshire. In 1889, Oscar Wilde noted on The Decay of Lying how "In fact the whole of Japan is pure invention. ... The Japanese people are ... simply a mode of style, an exquisite fancy of art." Also see Whistler's paintings and designs (principally in The Peacock Room and his nocturnes series).

Arthur Morrison begins his 'collecting' of Japanese paintings (culminating in his 1911 publication) and woodblock prints, buying wares in Wapping and Limehouse and bought through his friend Harold George Parlett (1869–1945), a British Japanese diplomat and writer on Buddhism; this eventually became the Arthur Morrison collection in the British Museum.

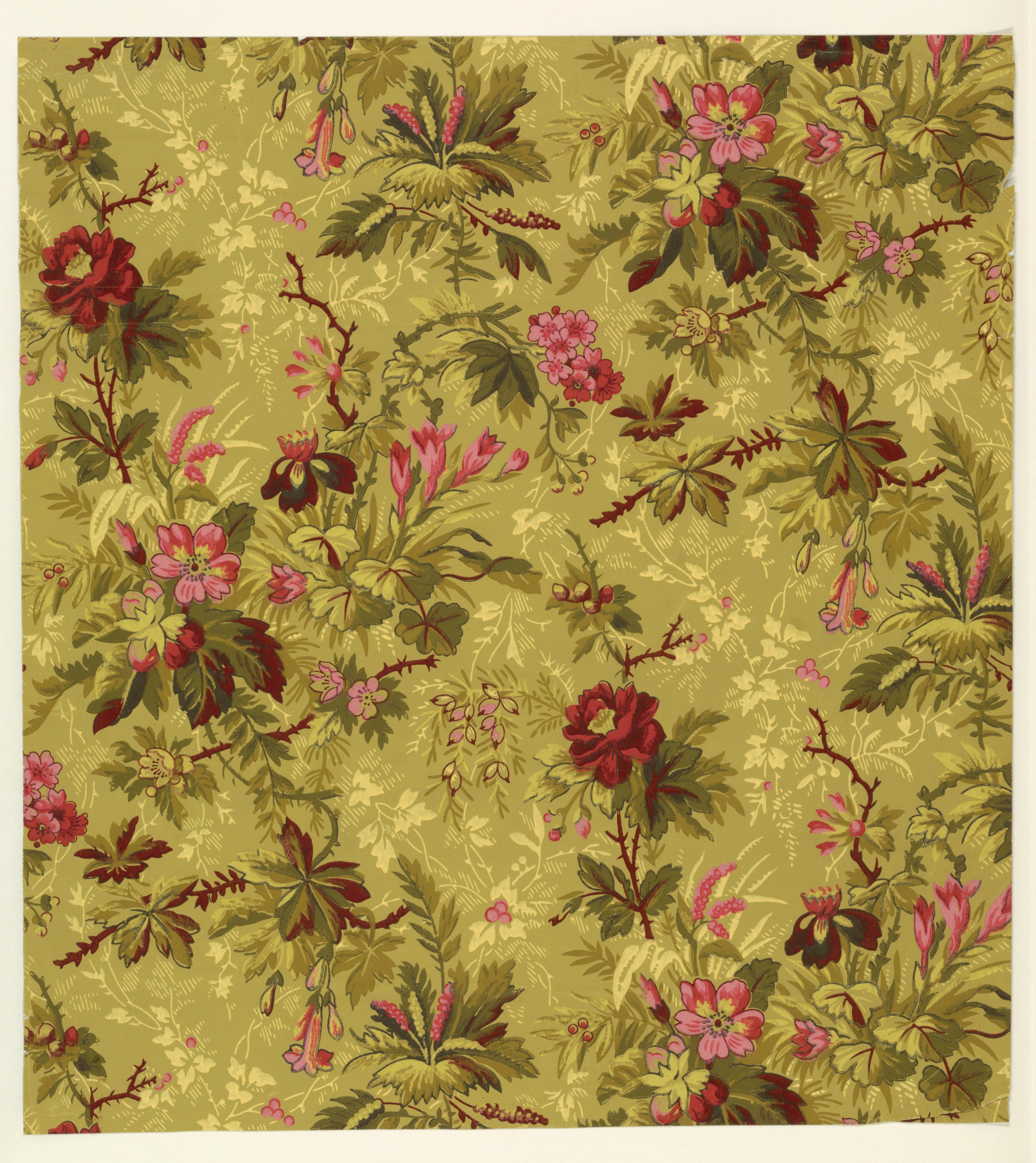
Anonymous, Aesthetic Wallpaper (1880)

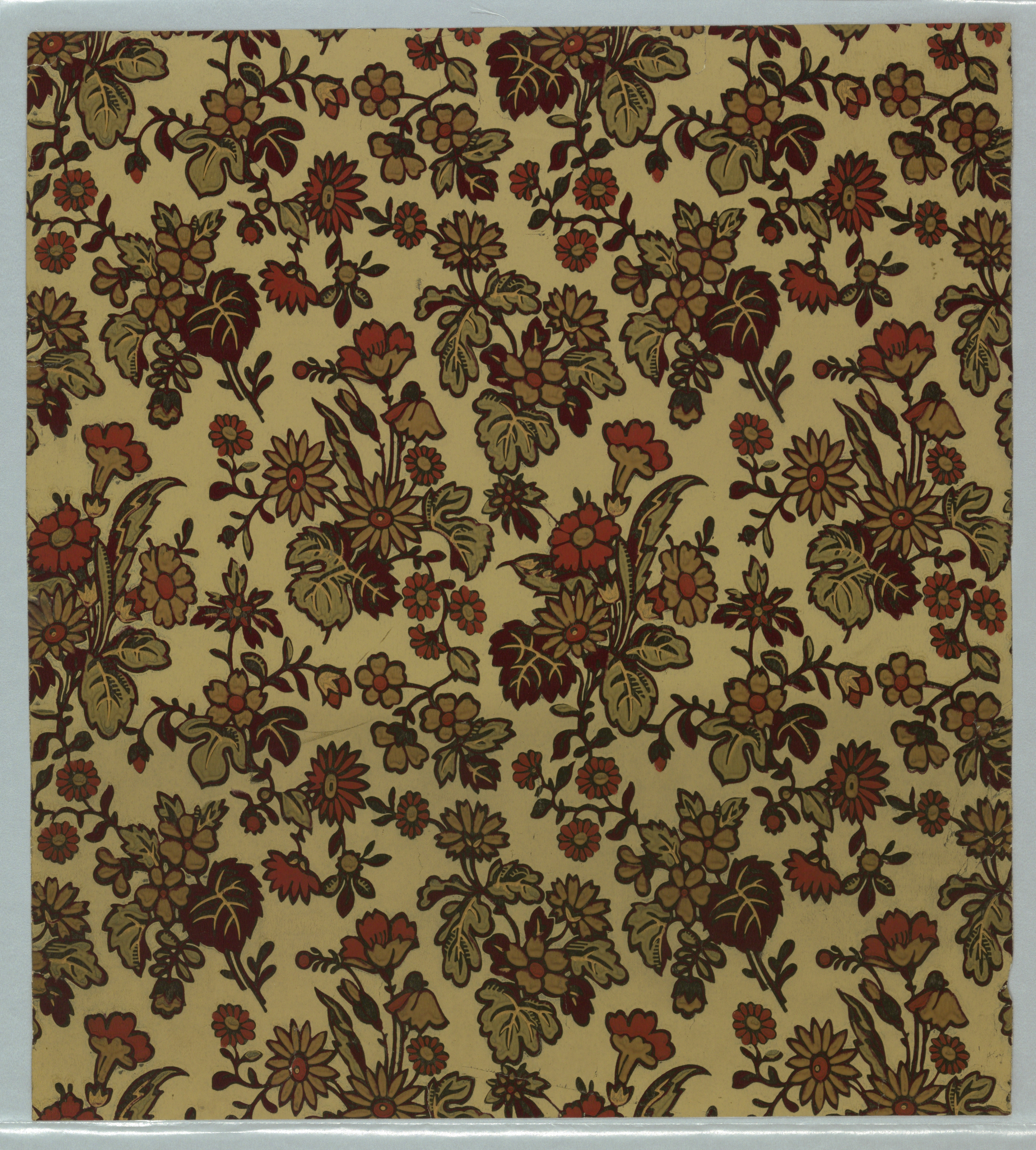
Aesthetic Wallpaper (c1880)

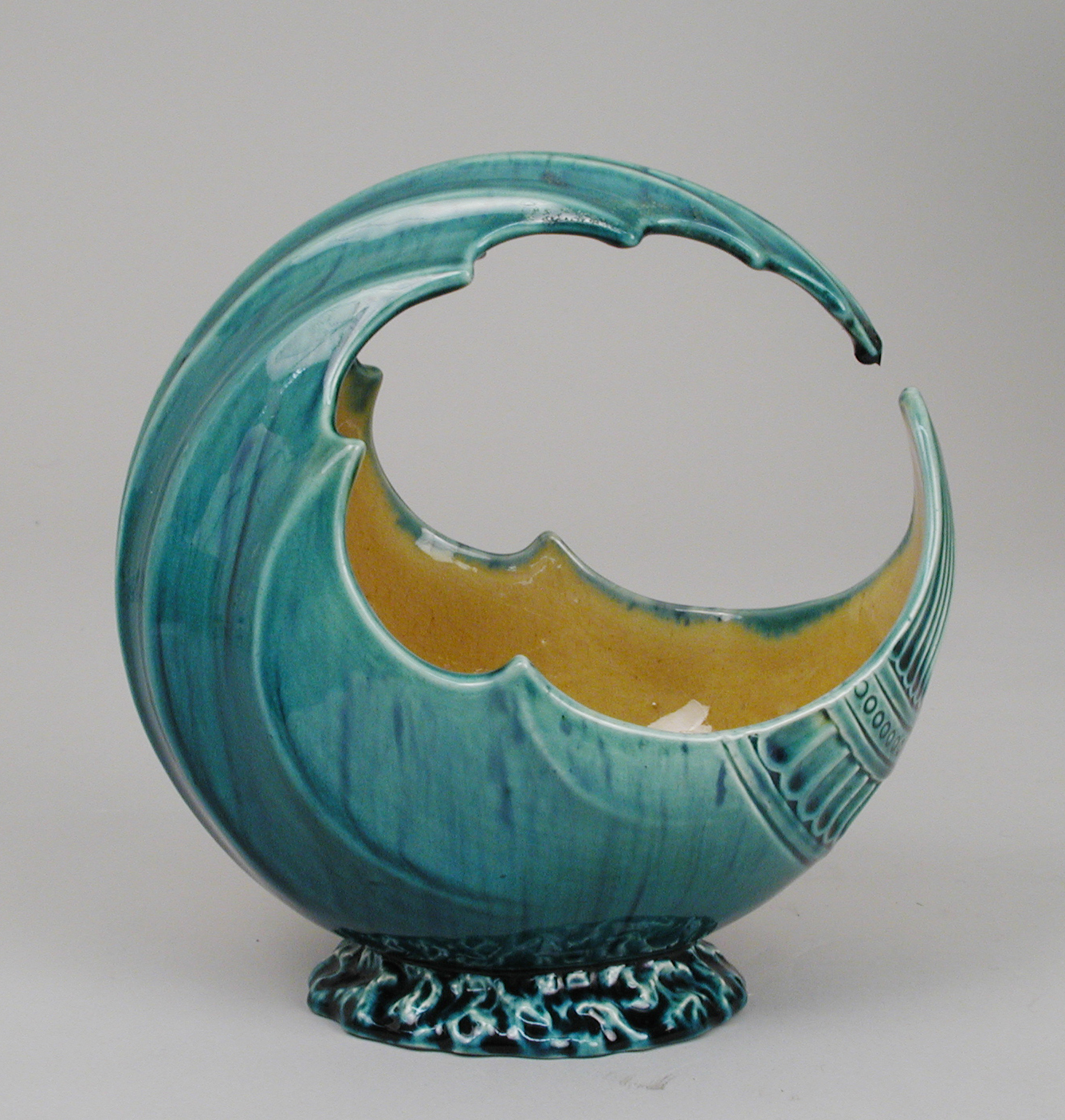
Dresser, 'Wave bowl' (c. 1880)

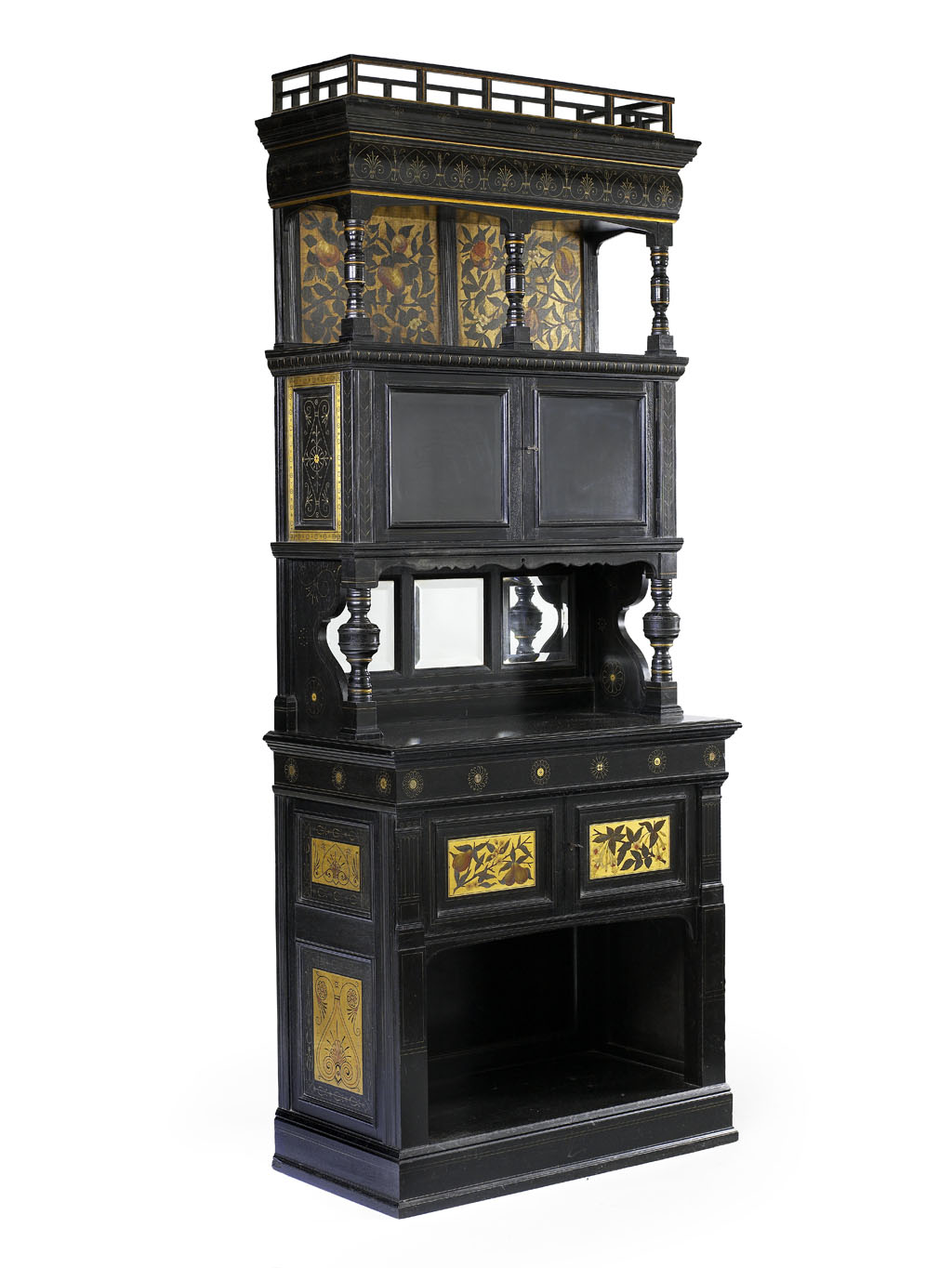
Cottier, Ebonised Cabinet (1880)

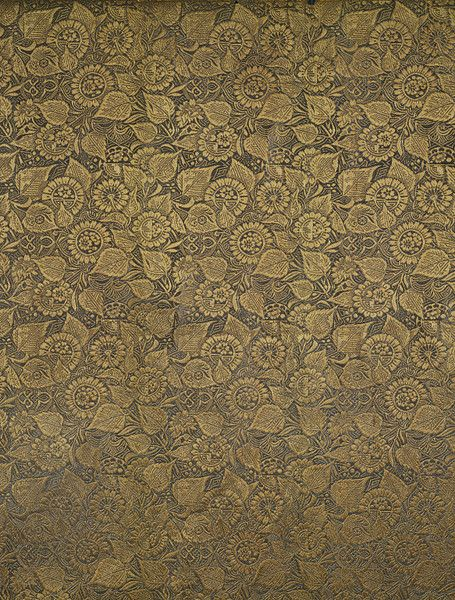
Talbert, Nagasaki design (1880)

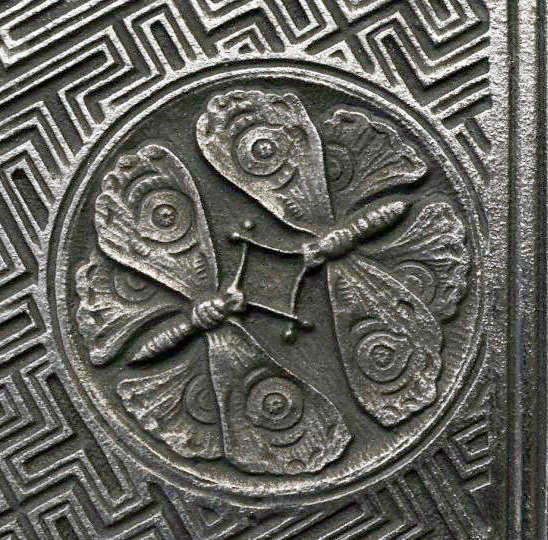
Jeckyll, Butterfly motif (c. 1880–1881)

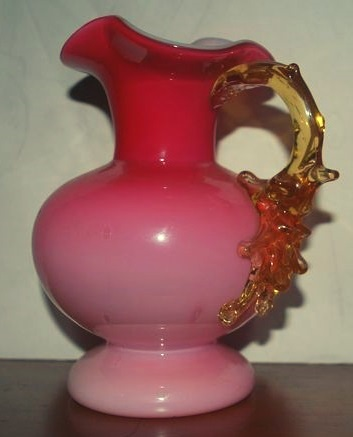
Steven & Williams, 'Matsu-no-Kee' Style Art-Glass (c. 1884)

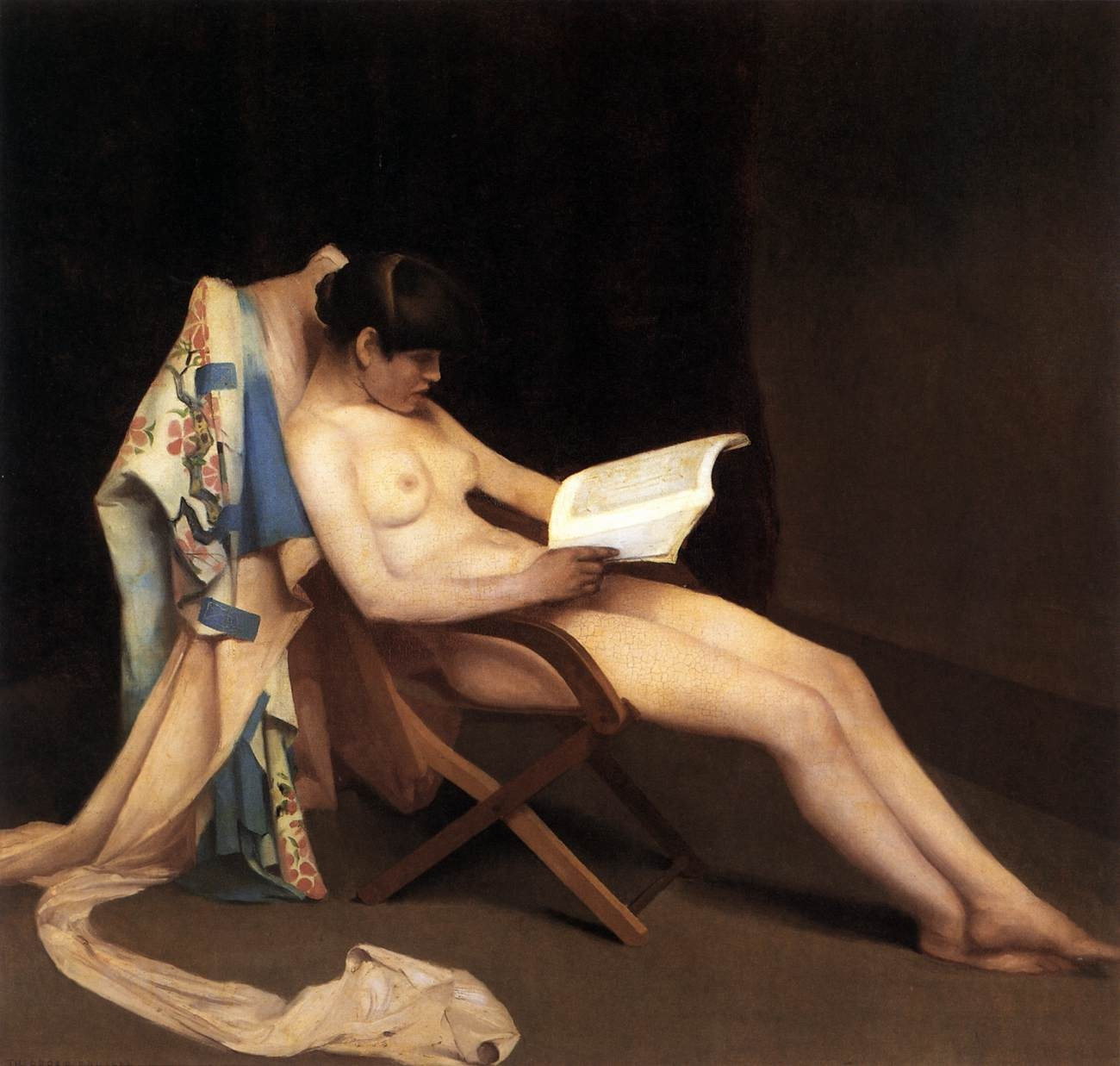
Roussel, The Reading Girl (1886)

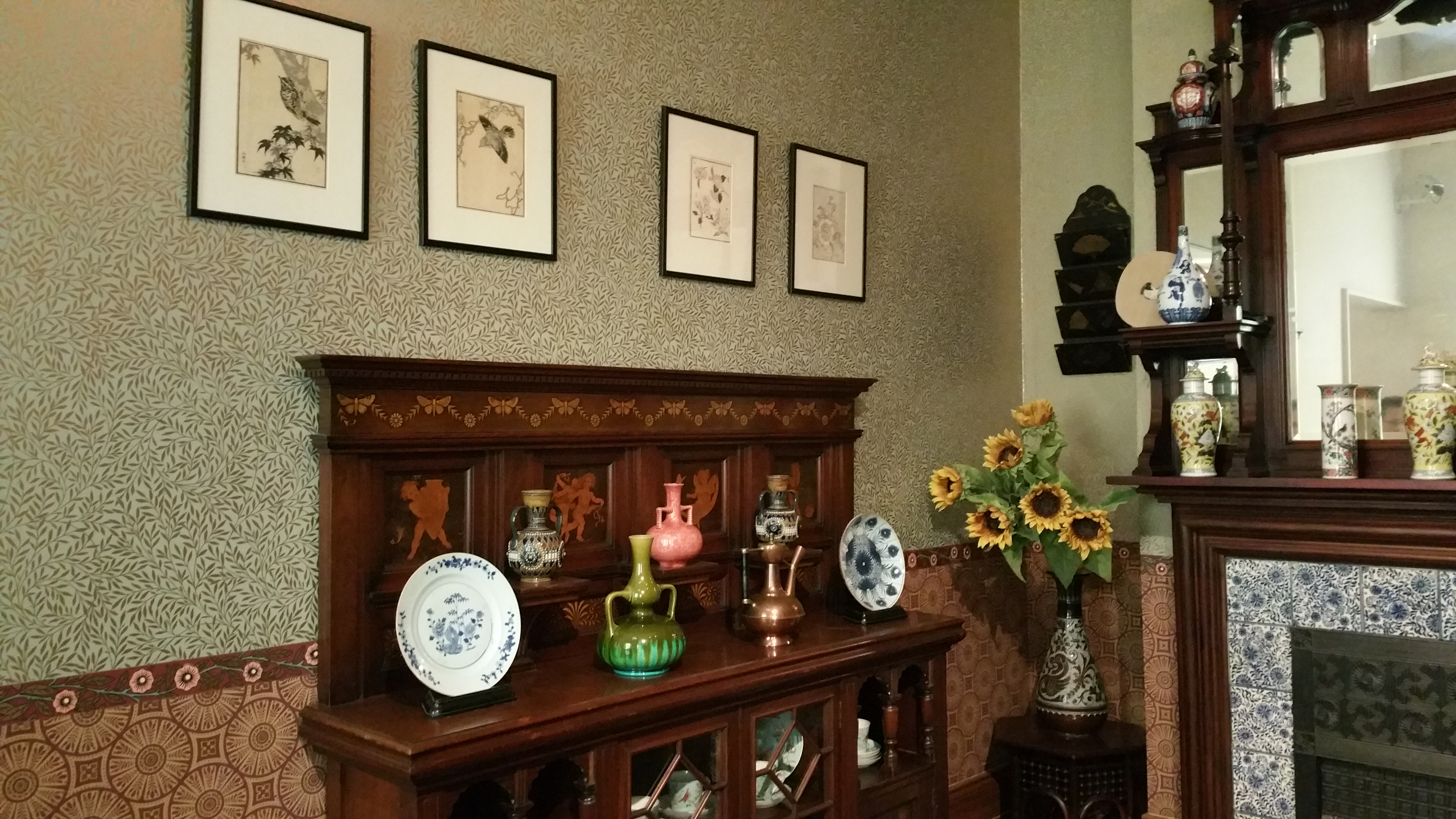
Museum of the Home, Aesthetical Interior (1882–1888)

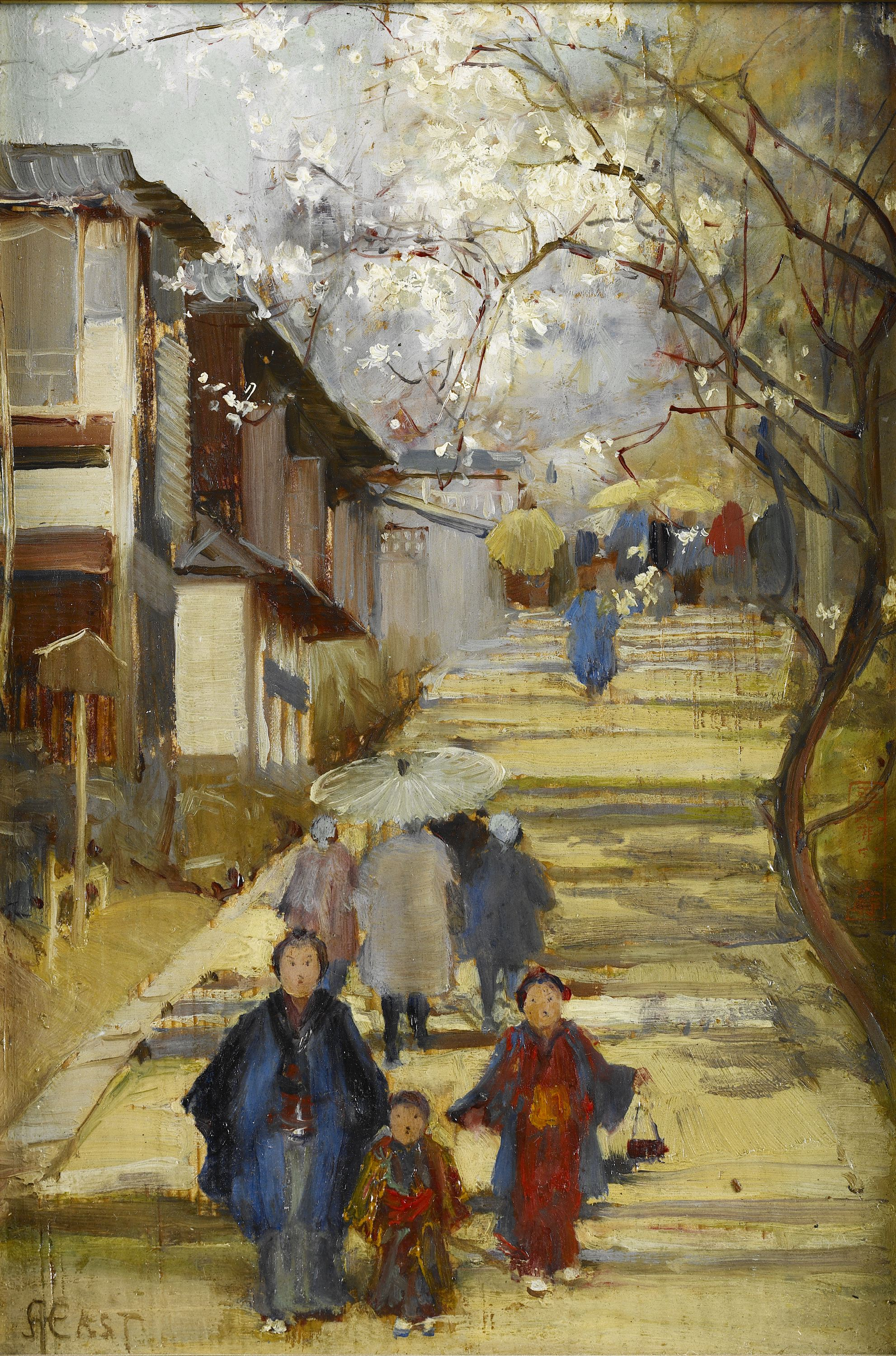
East, Steps to Maruyama (1888)

=== 1890–1899: Class consciousness ===
During the 1890s, the Anglo-Japanese was at the height of its popularity, with the middle classes in Victorian Britain also began to begin collecting and buying Japanese imports and Anglo-Japanese style designs and pieces. In 1890 the Bowes Museum of Japanese Art Work in Liverpool opening; in The Magazine of Art under Marion Harry Spielmann a number of articles were also published regarding Japanese art in the decade.

Two years prior, the painter Mortimer Menpes had travelled to Japan. Whilst there, Menpes developed a fascination with the architectural and decorative arts and upon return to London in 1889, had his home 'decorated in the Japanese style' by the architect Arthur Heygate Mackmurdo at 25 Cadogan Gardens, London by 1890. Menpes issued an Osaka-based Japanese company to furnish his home with stained curved wood panelling, traditionally seen in Shiro interiors or cornicing with gold detailing; based on Japanese lacquer, installed Kunmiko Ramma (decorative latticed ventilation screens), double-sided Anglo-Japanese window frames and employed typical minimal decoration. Furniture was also imported from Europe and Japan, with European chairs, sofa's and woven tapestries, simplistic 'Japanese character' drawers and cabinets, bronze and paper lanterns and lighting fixtures and porcelain jars which Menpes collaborated with Japanese potters on whilst in Japan.

"Mr. Menpes, by his free application of gold and colours and by his display in European fashion of numerous ornaments, has rather gone beyond Japanese custom in domestic interiors, ... as he has wished to adapt from rather than slavishly imitate the prototype. ... there is a growing feeling in the minds of many, and especially among those to whom the question of expense is not of paramount importance, that a house, to be in the highest sense an artistic house, should contain no decorations but those made by the hands of man, and especially adapted to their surroundings. Let ornament be used as sparingly as may be desired, but whatever there is of it, let it be of the best. Plain structural forms and plain surfaces add to rather than detract from the beauty of a house, provided their proportions are duly considered and that they are so placed that they relieve in effect some object of consummate decorative value." The Studio #17 (1899)

In 1891, the Japan Society was founded, and began to disseminate the writings of British expatriates who had worked within Japan, and writings on Japanese art, on topics such as Japanese woodwork, metalwork and Japanese artists Toyokuni I, Hiroshige, Kyosai, the Kano School. Contemporary Japanese art critics also published with the society such as Yone Noguchi and Okakura Kakuzō. Arthur Silver at Rottman, Strome, and Co began using the Ise katagami technique to make wallpaper. Andrew White Tuer also publishes information on katagami stencilling, promoted in England as sanitary 'leather paper' in his Book of Delightful and Strange Designs, Being One Hundred Facsimile Illustrations of the Art of the Japanese Stencil Cutter (1892). Furniture in the Anglo Japanese style was also reported by this time to have begun to use Mother-of-Pearl-inlay, a traditionally Japanese material made in Japan and imported for the British market. Allen William Seaby, pupil of Fletchley at the University of Reading begins to study Japanese woodblock printing.

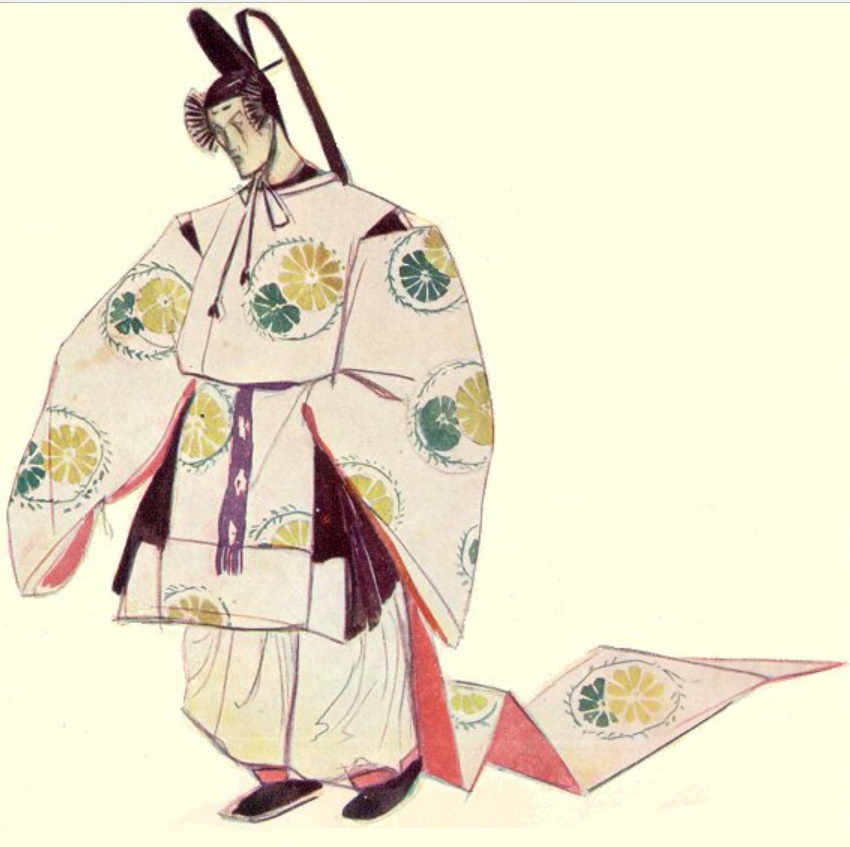
Ricketts The Mikado designs

One notable example from the decade of the move into the modern style includes Aubrey Beardsley, who intertwined the influence of what was termed in England the Modern Style with Japanese woodblock prints (such as Hokusai's Manga, made from 1814 to 1878) to form an English adaptation of the 'grotesque effects which the Japanese convention allowed' of presenting illustration in the Salome (1893) and The Yellow Book (1894–1897), particularly his 'Bon-Mots of Sydney Smith' (1893) illustrations. He was known to have received a copy of shunga by the artist Utamaro from William Rothenstein which heavily influenced Beardsley's own erotic imagery, being first introduced to Japanese woodblock prints during his lunch hours working in Frederick Evan's Holborn bookstore circa 1889. Beardsley was drawn to the Japanese sensibility of depicting the nude human body by being open to nudity and depicting this humorously, rejecting Victorian notions of how the body should be depicted in art. As well as the 'asymmetrical distribution of masses, ... absence of compactness, space, or light and shadow' amongst the 'curved lines' of the Peacock skirt.

Charles Ricketts also showcased the influence of Japanese line art in Wilde's 1891 House of Pomegranates which used Peacock and crocus blooms which 'appear in uniform rows like a repeated wallpaper pattern' (such as in the aesthetical merit of Voysey) and the 'asymmetrical construction of the page [, bookcover and illustration]' design; drawing also from nature; and in his proportions for the 1894 Wilde publication of the Sphinx which also predated the early form of English-Japanese influences of the Modern Style. The forms of waves in House of Pomegranates is also heavily reminiscent of Hokusai's woodblock prints.

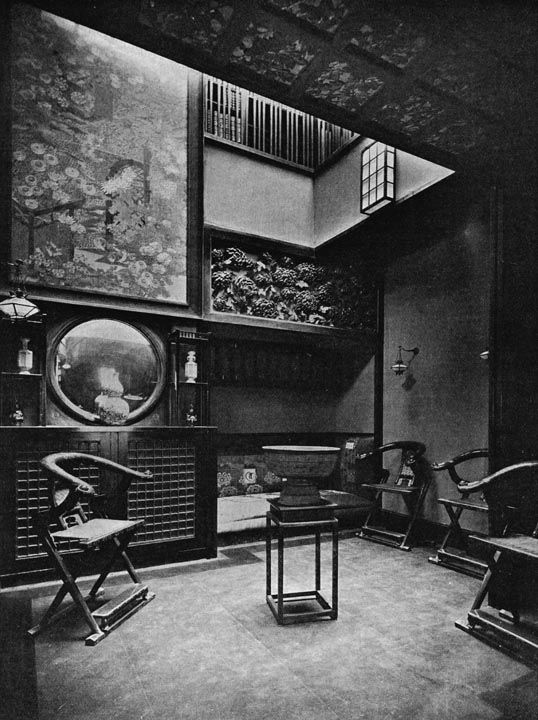
Menpes, London 'Japanese-House' Interior (c. 1890)

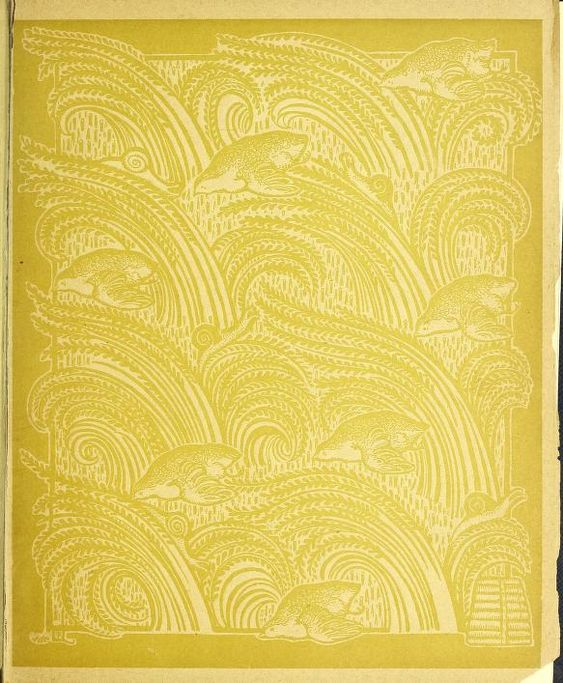
Ricketts Pomegranate frontispiece design (1891)

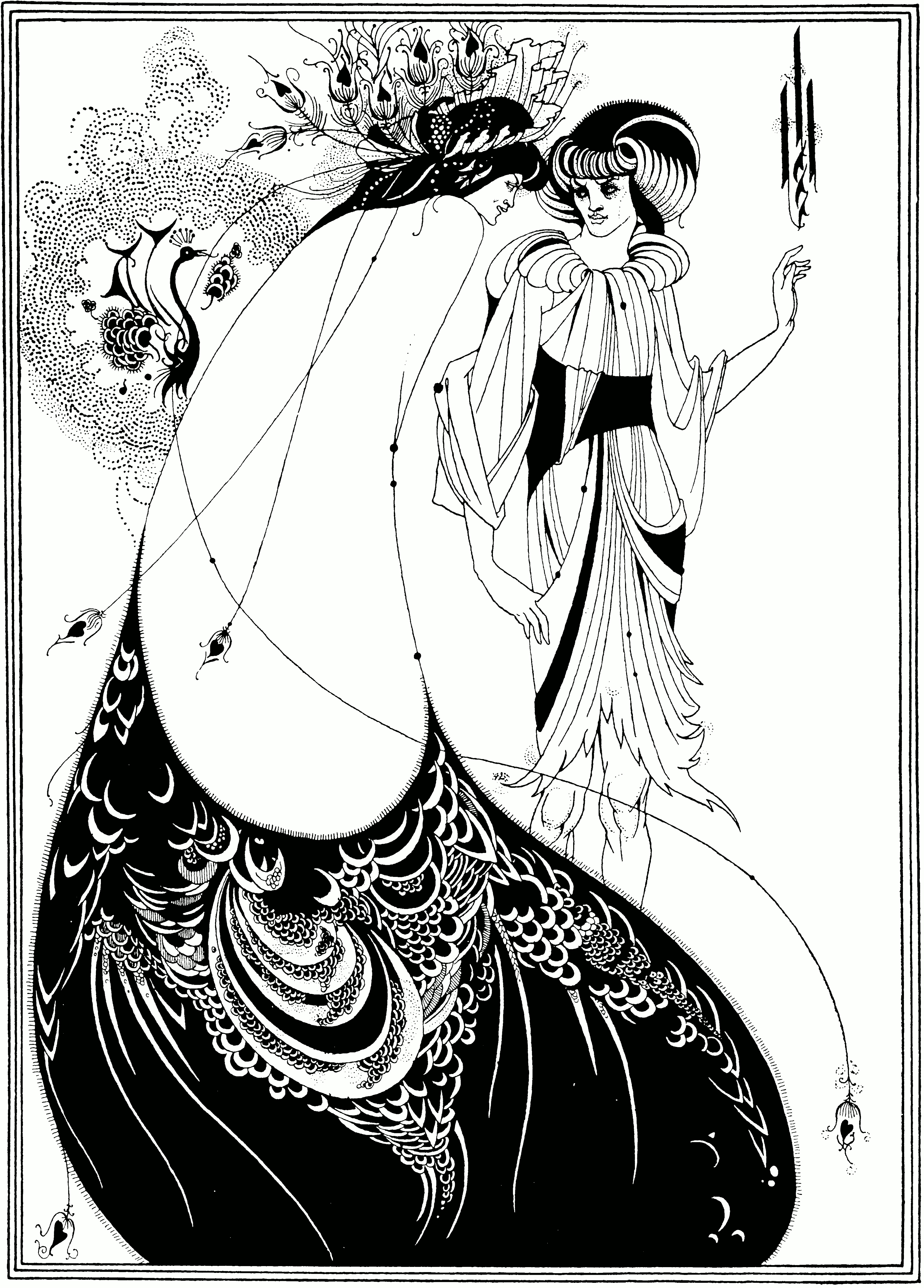
Beardsley, Peacock-skirt Illustration (1892)

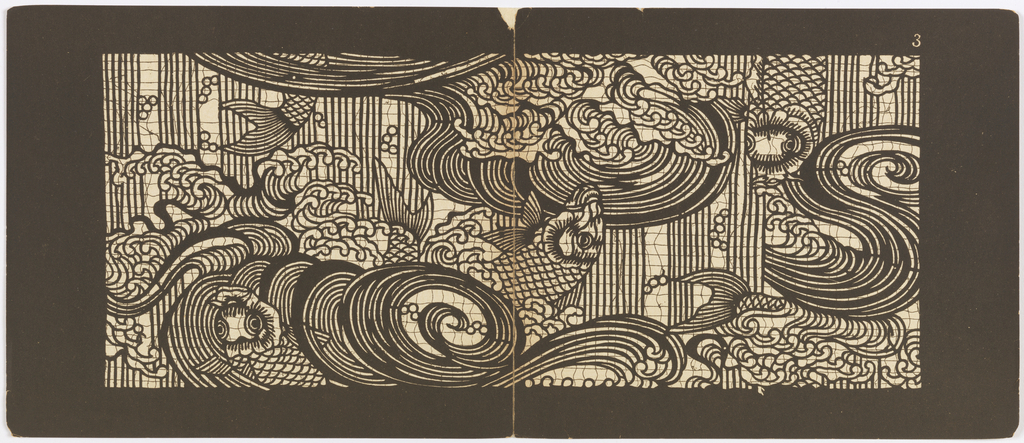
Tuer, Katagami wallpaper stencil (1893)

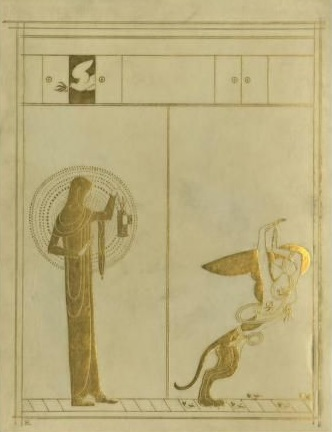
Ricketts, Sphinx design (1894)

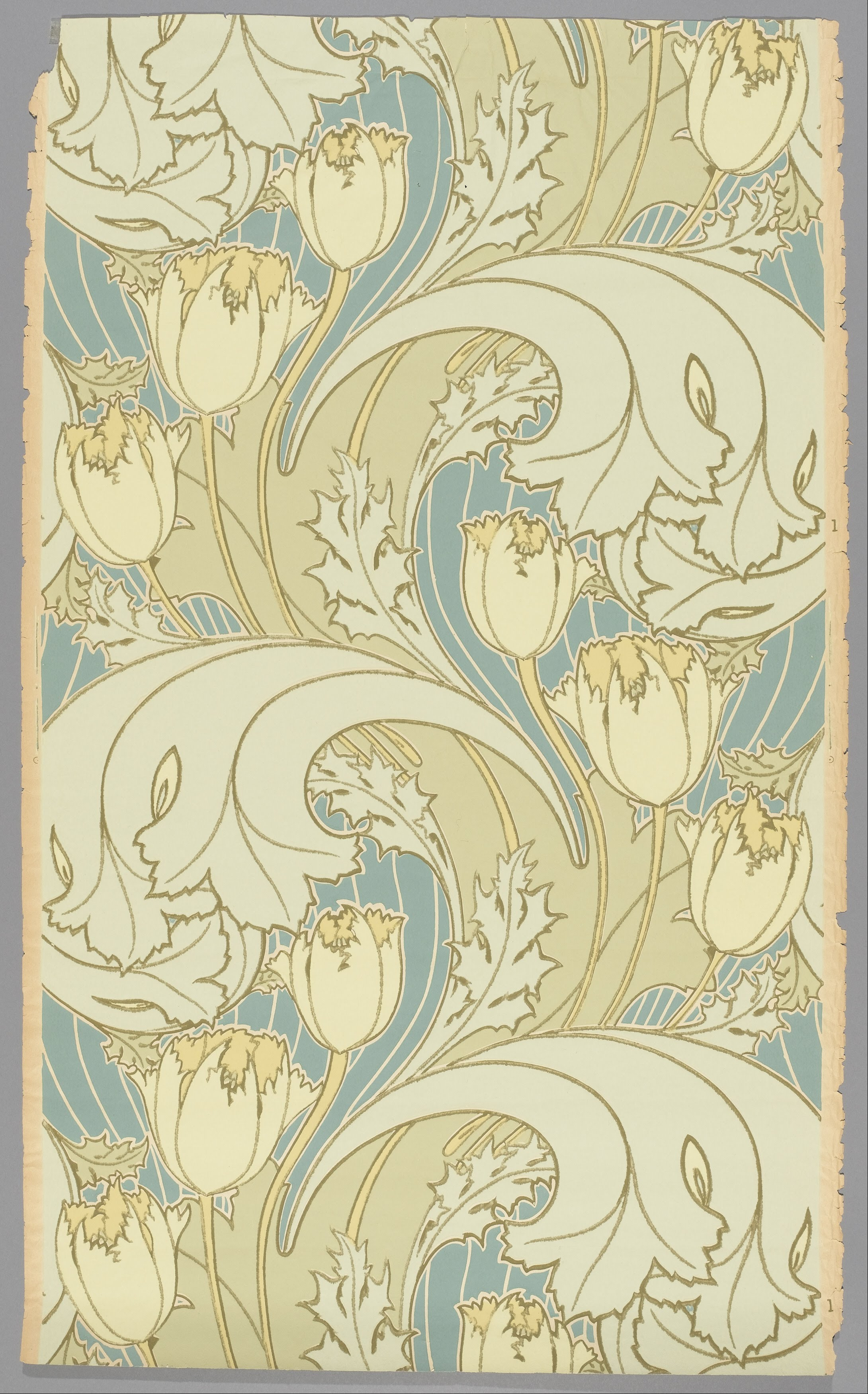
Voysey, Liberty Wallpaper (1893–95)

=== 1900–1925: Modernism and bilateral exchange ===
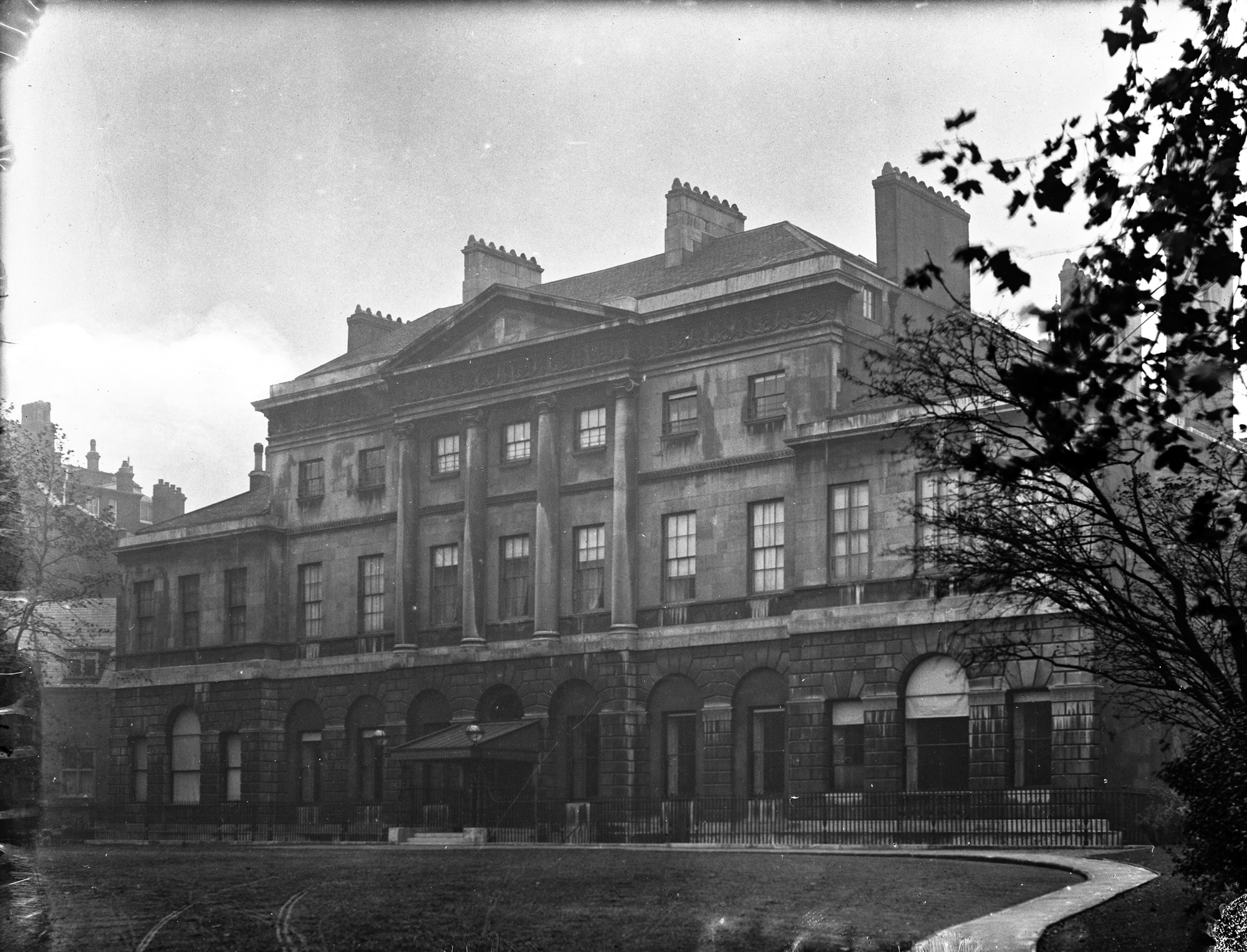
Landsdowne House where 1902 Treaty was signed

In 1902, with the signing of the Anglo-Japanese Alliance, Japan gained great power status in the eyes of British foreign policy-makers and along with 'progressive' industrialisation, Japanese influence became more pronounced, particularly with regard to the ship building industry in Glasgow. As such, British society began to exchange further with this fellow industrialised nation, exchanging ideas on Art, Aesthetics (particularly compositional) and academic bilateral exchange so that by the end of the 1910s, with this industrial, educational and academically driven shift, bilateral cultural exchange replaced the one-way Anglo-Japanese Style by way of greater cultural understanding of Japanese Art and its history, certainly among academics and publicly available national museums, and notable Japanese art figures, scholars and critics.

==== Liberty's and the Modern Style; 1900–1915 ====
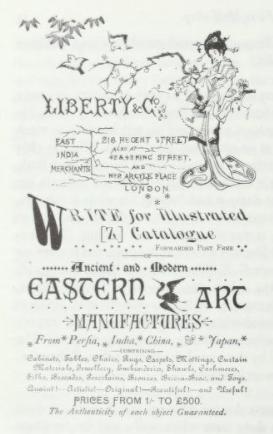
Liberty Advertisement (1880)

By 1901, Liberty Style began to flourish in Italy. This derived from a number of Japanese, Greek, Celtic and Renaissance themes, 'with those Japanese elements appealing to English sensibilities: asymmetry, simplicity, sensitivity to medium, and ... modest materials', which 'attained international popularity and came to epitomize British Art Nouveau' (also known as the modern style in England). First in England, with Liberty's rejection of the Aestheticism movements art principles of Art for Arts sake as poor design, favouring good design in mass manufacturing formats. With the influence of Mackintosh, and the design department's simplicity or vacui of design seen in the works of Archibald Knox, Arthur Silver, C F A Voysey and the popularity of the blend of Japanese and Celtic motif Mackintosh introduced in Europe, Japanese art aesthetic continued to influence and instill itself into the British design schools. Japanese influence was accepted among influences into the modern style from the time Liberty first began importing Japanese goods in the 1860s as 'England not only preceded other countries by several decades in accepting the example offered by Japan, but also underwent its influence over a much longer period' culminating for Liberty in eventually what became the modern style in England, taking from Japanese design the refined elegance inherent in the sparsity of Japanese design.

Otto Eckmann noted in the period that 'only England knew how to assimilate and transform this wealth of new ideas and to adapt them to its innate national character, thus deriving real profit from the Japanese style' in his preface to a series on Jugendstil; these decorative Japanese influenced Liberty textiles had thus become extremely popular in Germany; in Italy the style was known as Stile Liberty after the fabric designs of Liberty's, and seen in the Turin 1902 Exhibition and work of Carlo Bugatti. So in England, the Modern Style thus emerged in this melding of cultural motif, and also emerged in the works Ricketts for Wilde and of Beardsley in the last years of his life, inspired by Utamaro prints.

Japanese interior design is also heavily prominent in the works of Charles Voysey, and shared with Mackintosh for their 'abastraction ... of new and individual approaches to the design of interior space'. Seen most heavily in his wallpaper designs which reduced ornamental and decorative elements, Voysey declared he wished in his design to start by 'getting rid of useless ornament and burning the modish finery which disfigures our furniture and our household utensils ... [and] to cut down the number of patterns and [colours] in one room.' The influence on his interiors can be seen in Horniman House from 1906 to 1907.

==== Garden design; 1901–1910 ====
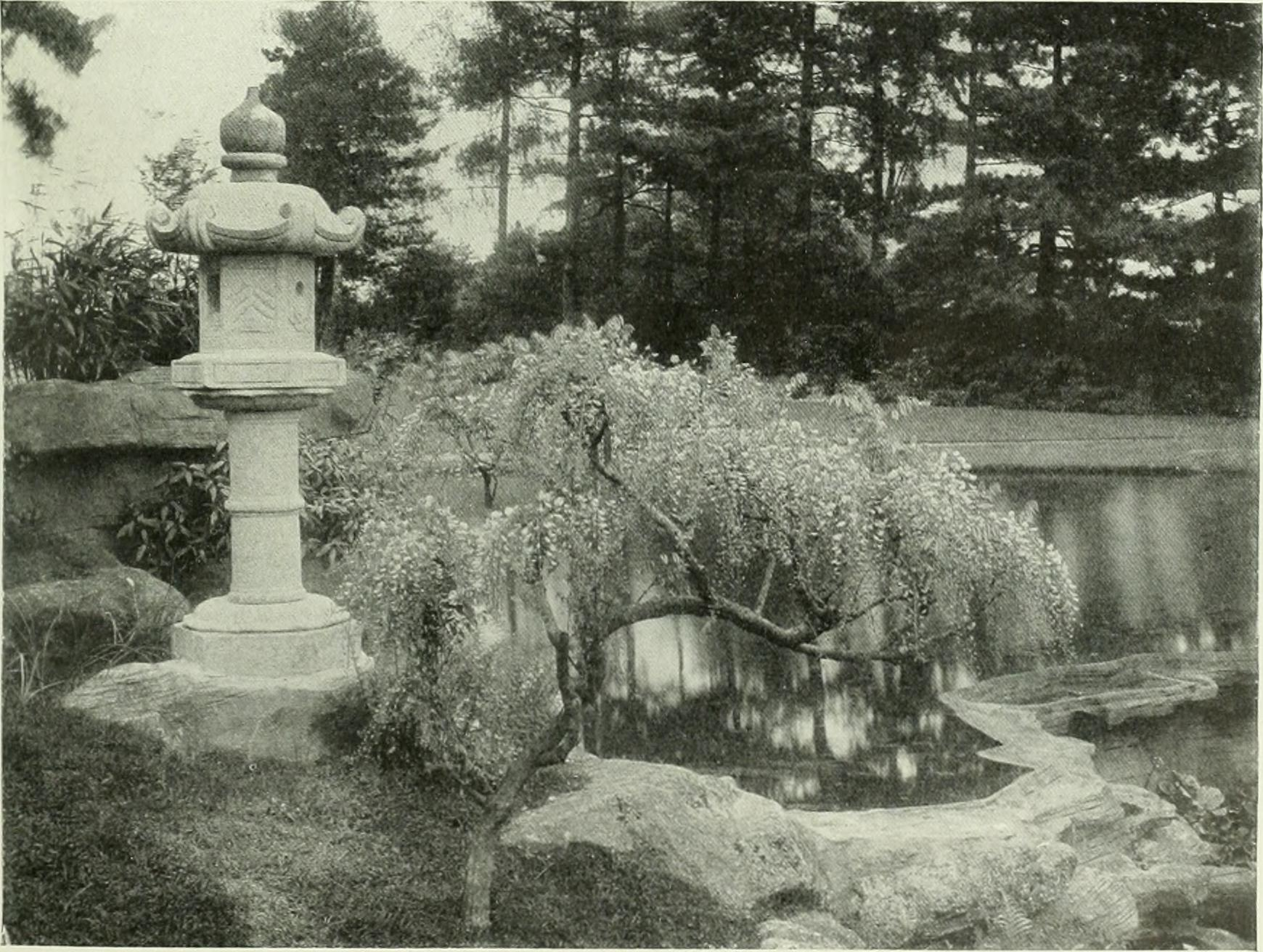
Stone lantern and dwarf wistaria at Friar Park, Henley-on-Thames (c. 1899, by Frank Crisp)

With this appreciation of Japan came an influx of interest also in the appreciation of Japanese garden design. The first acclaimed Japanese garden is often cited as having popularised the style was Leopold de Rothschild Japanese bamboo garden opened at Gunnersby Estate in West London in 1901. In 1903 Reginald Farrer popularised the rock gardening style affiliated by English gardeners with Zen gardens further in his writings. In 1908 this was furthered by the Scottish design proffered by Taki Handa. The Japanese garden at Tatton Park is an example of Anglo-Japanese gardening style. Common elements include 'stone lanterns, the use of large rocks and pebbles, stone bowls of water, and decorative shrubs and flowers like acers, azaleas and lilies' and 'red painted bridges'. The 1910 Floating Isle Garden particularly reinforced these elements in the style. Although elements of traditional Japanese garden design was incorporated, many English garden elements flowed into the overall appearance as well. By 1910 the Japanese garden had become a popular fixture such as at Hascombe Court by Percy Cane and Christopher Tunnard.

==== Bilateral artisanal exchange; 1901–1923 ====
The 1902 Japanese Whitechapel Exhibition was favourably reviewed by Charles Lewis Hind, however Laurence Binyon noted the exhibition was lacking and that 'some day a loan exhibition may be formed which shall at least adumbrate the range and history of that [Japanese] art'. Charles Ricketts and Charles Haslewood Shannon donate their Japanese collection of Harunobu, Utagawa and Hokusai woodblock prints to the British Museum in this period. The Burlington Magazine was established in 1903 and with Charles Holmes editing the magazine, a number of articles on Japanese art were being published in the periodical, as well as in English Illustrated Magazine in 1904.

In 1905, Kokka began to be published in English. In 1906, Sidney Sime produced a number of illustrated works for Edward Plunkett, 18th Baron of Dunsany the Time and the Gods (1906). Dunsany was familiar with Japanese theatre and introduced Sime to a number of the conventions, which can be seen evident particularly in these illustrations, such as the stooping postures and placement of figures, and fore and backgrounds application of stippling combined with wave forms commonly seen in 19th century Japanese kimono for example. Eric Slater, taught by Fletcher and inspired by Arthur Rigden Read began to make Japanese woodcut prints as well.

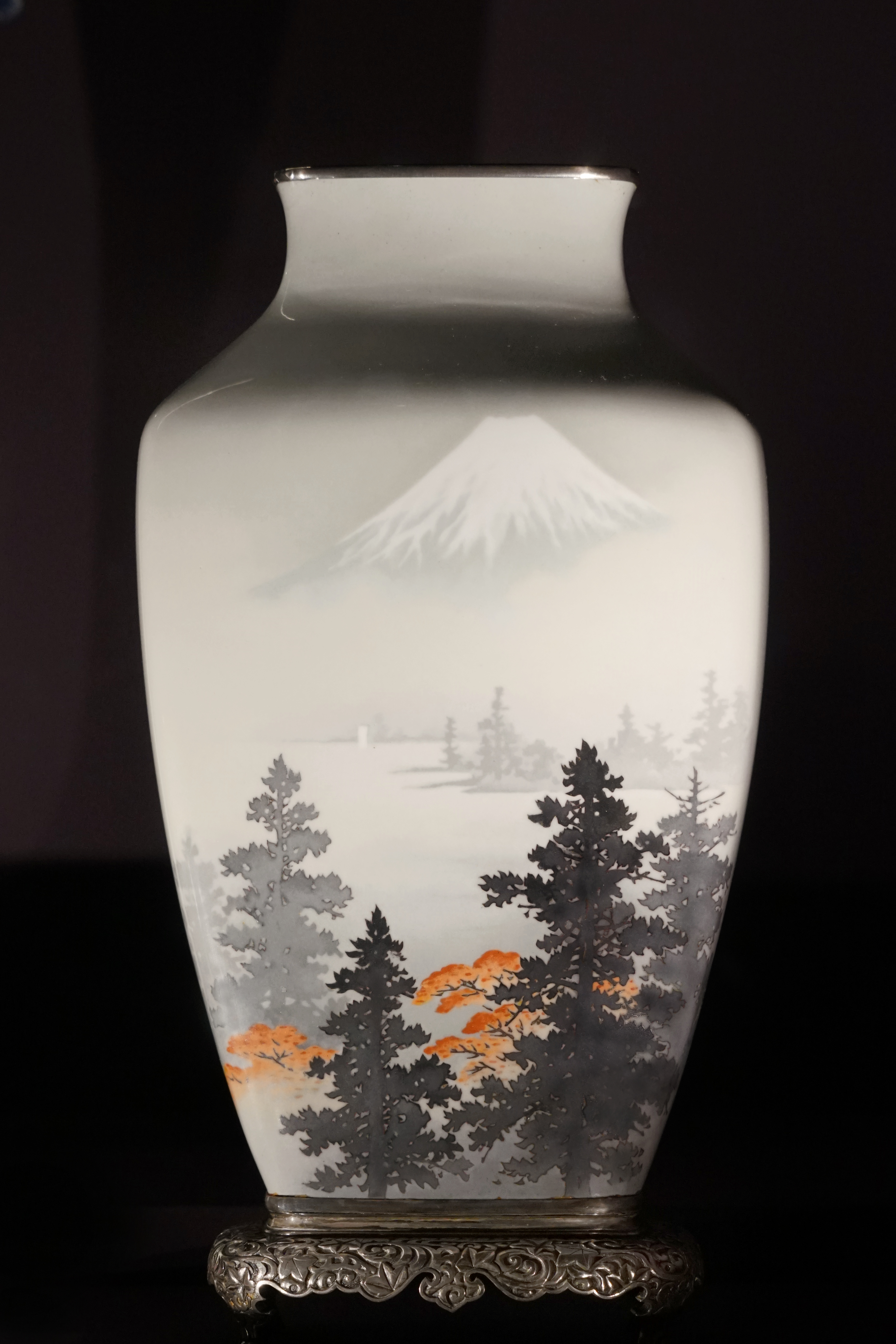
Vase exhibited in 1910 at Shepherds Bush Exhibition

In particular, painting and illustration were further elaborated on at this time. Japanese art critic Seiichi Taki (1873–1945) noted in Studio Magazine; how Occidental and Oriental painting regarded the subject matter of painting in expressing an idea to an audience as important; but that they differed in their outcomes and execution by how the western style of painting lays 'stress on [the] objective, and the other [(Japanese)] on subjective ideas'. Taki noted that in Western painting focused heavily on a singular object, such as framing the human body to be the sole focal point of attention in a painting, 'in Japanese pictures, flowers, birds, landscapes, even withered trees and lifeless rocks' are given these points of focal interest; such that the execution of for example a Byobu screen is not draw the eye to one part of the painting, but to all parts of it such it created in the picture as a whole as 'microcosmically complete.' Roger Fry also noted how European artists had begun to forget Chiaroscuro in favour of the Eastern style of what Binyon termed sensuosness; or the 'rejection of light and shade'. Fry noted in 1910 how Chinese and Japanese art "rejected light and shade as belonging primarily to the sculptor's art" concluding "certain broad effects of lighted and shaded atmosphere, effects of mist, of night, and of twilight, they have for six centuries shown the way which only quite modern European art has begun to follow."

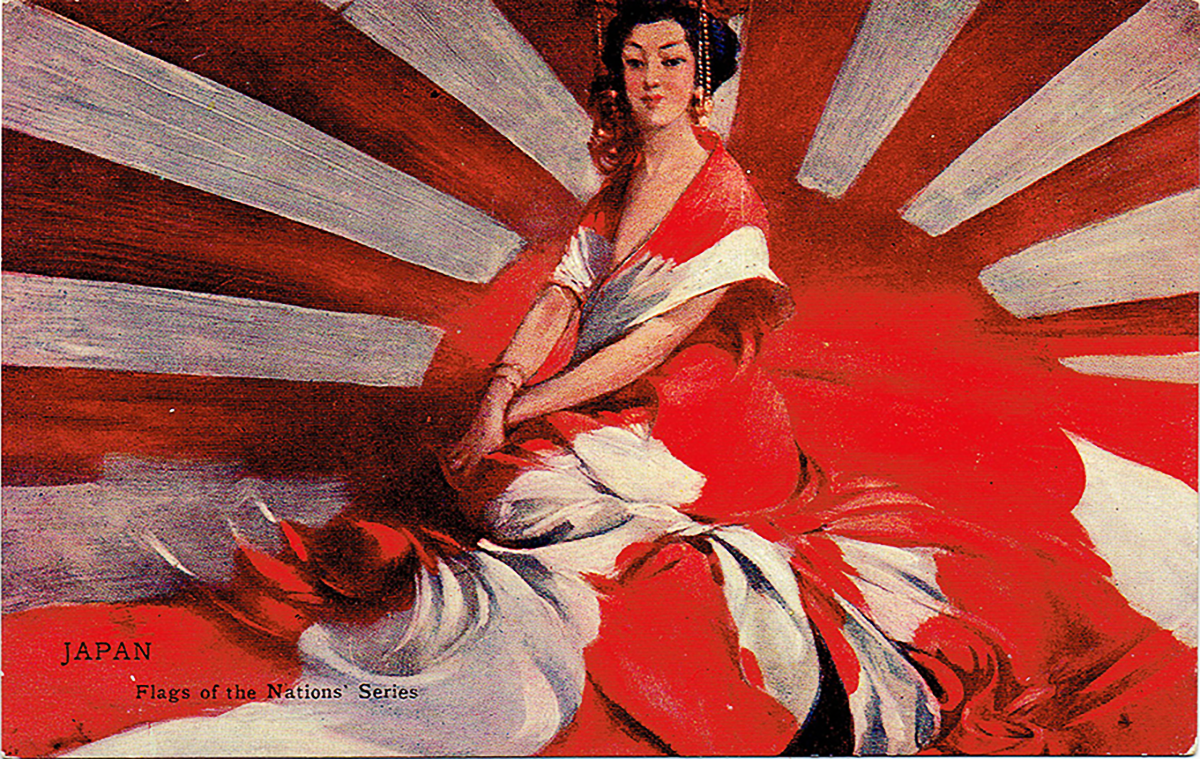
Exhibition Postcard 1910

The Japan–British Exhibition occurred in 1910, where Japan loaned a number of its art and industrial objects to the UK. During this decade though, the style would come to a close as academics and public museums had begun to fully appreciate and exchange more fully with living artisans and the Japanese community in the UK (between 500 and 1000 people at this time) who had arrived for the 1910 exhibition. Harry Allen (fl. 1910–1925) also designed a number of blue Titianian Vases decorated in Anglo-Japanese motifs such as the Red-crowned crane or Peacock and Matsu pine leaves for Royal Doulton.

In 1913, when Binyon took over the Japanese section of the Oriental Department at the British Museum, he along with Rothenstein, Morrison, Ricketts and Sazlewood had formed a literary and arts based circle of collectors of Japanese prints. Binyon radically helped to improve the quality of the department, and thus helped the general understanding of the depth and variety of Japanese painting styles known by the general public. Ricketts particularly enjoyed the Korin or Rinpa style of painting. Binyon's published works also helped to showcase a new Oriental based worldview, rather than espousing a eurocentric one; for example Binyon explains how the 'Japanese look to China as we look to Italy and Greece : [that] for them it is the classic land, the source from which their art has drawn not only methods, materials, and principles of design, but an endless variety of theme and motive.'

My chief concern has been, not to discuss questions of authorship or archaeology, but to inquire what aesthetic value and significance these Eastern paintings possess for us in the West – Binyon (1913)

With the advent of the further academic understanding of Japanese aesthetics, the Anglo-Japanese style ended, morphing into Modernism with the death of the 'Japan Craze' and Japanese art objects having become permanent parts of European and American Museum collections. Particularly this is noticeable in the sparsity or plain backgrounds in the work of Charles Rennie Mackintosh and the stage and costume design of Edward Gordon Craig. Bernard Leach also helped to inspire a return to more traditional craftsmanship in Japan with the Mingei movement in Japan and on pottery in England for William Staite Murray in his choice of materials.

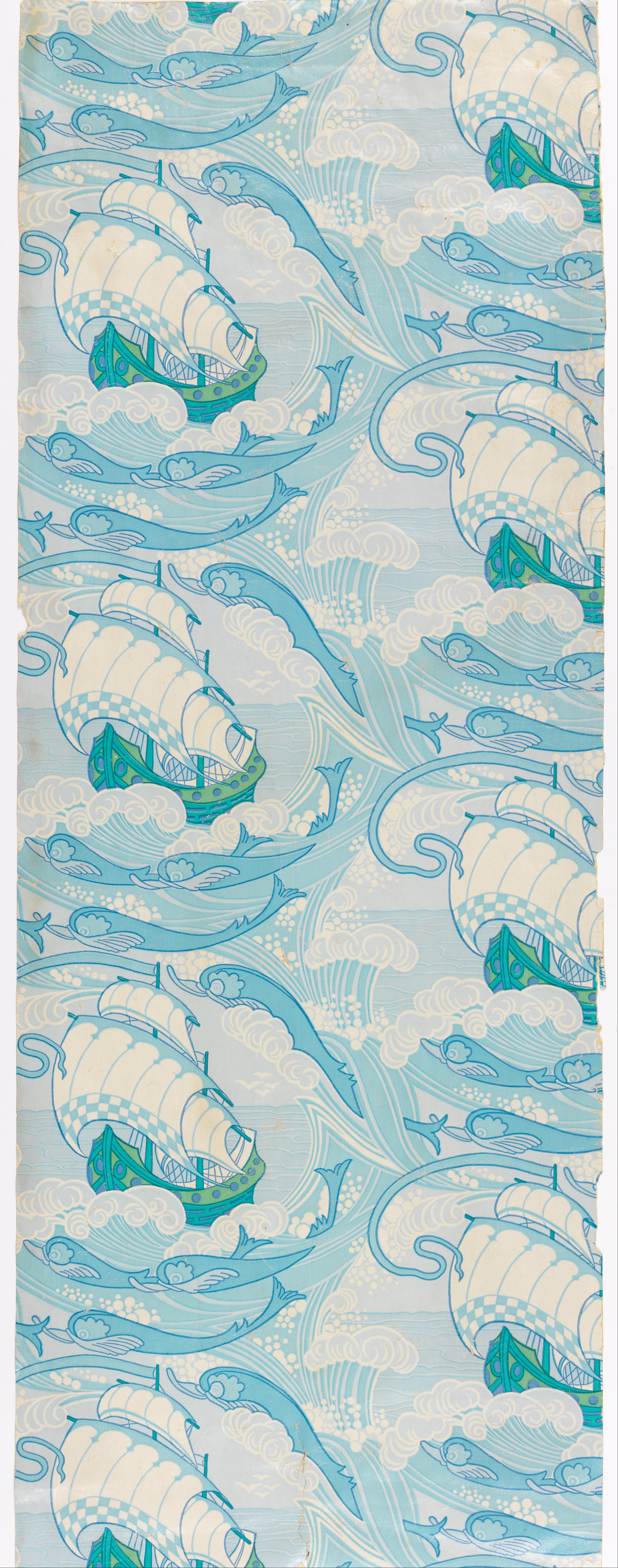
Dresser; Side-wallpaper Design (c. 1880–1904)

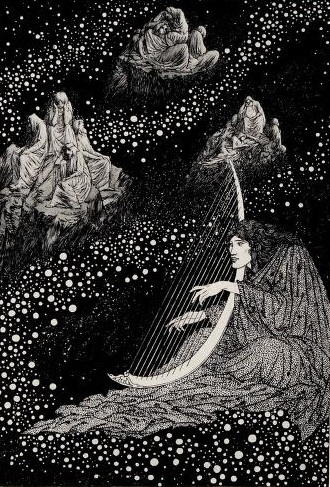
Sime, The Dirge of Shimono Kani (1906)

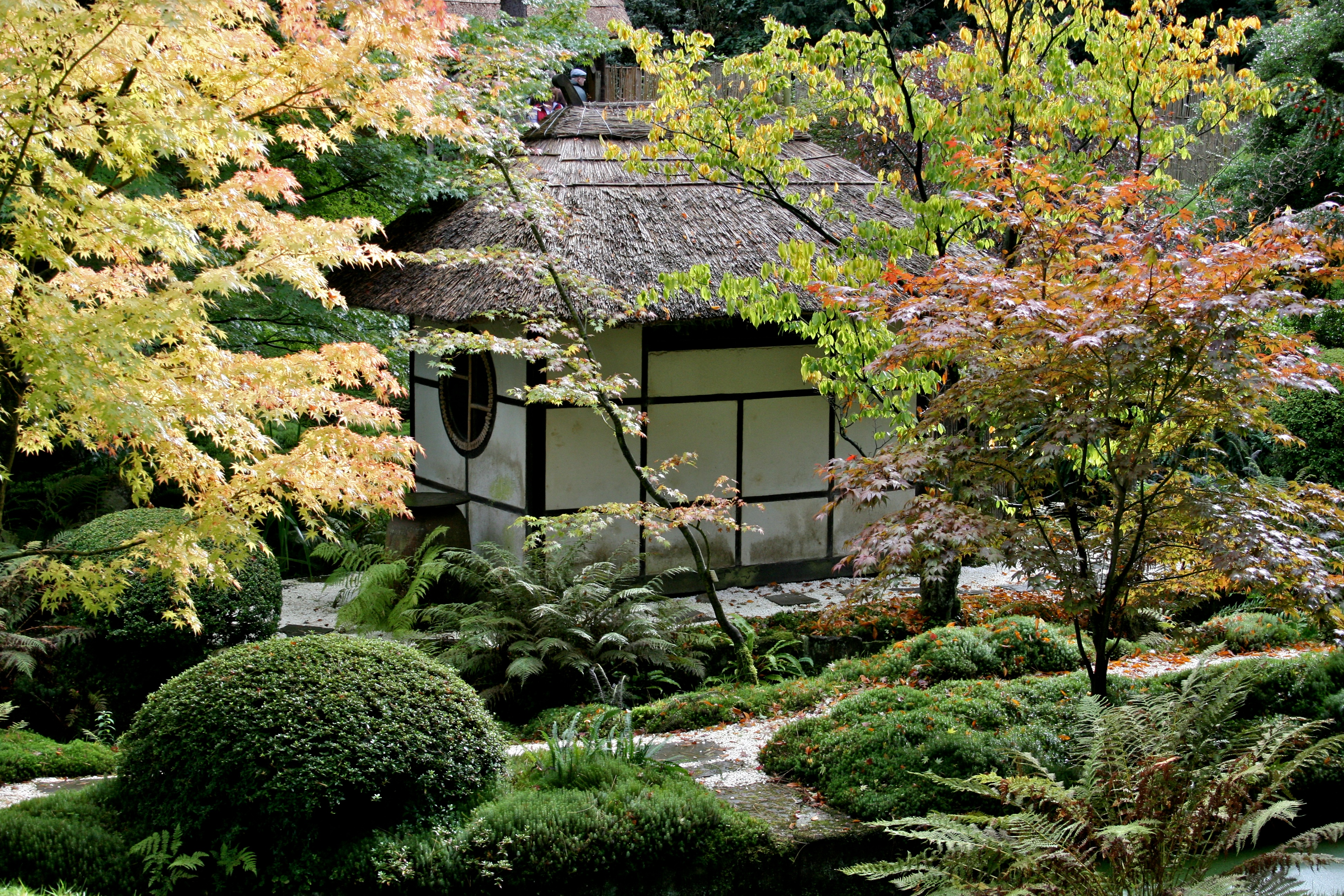
Tatton's Tatton Park, built in the Anglo-Japanese style (c. 1910–1911)

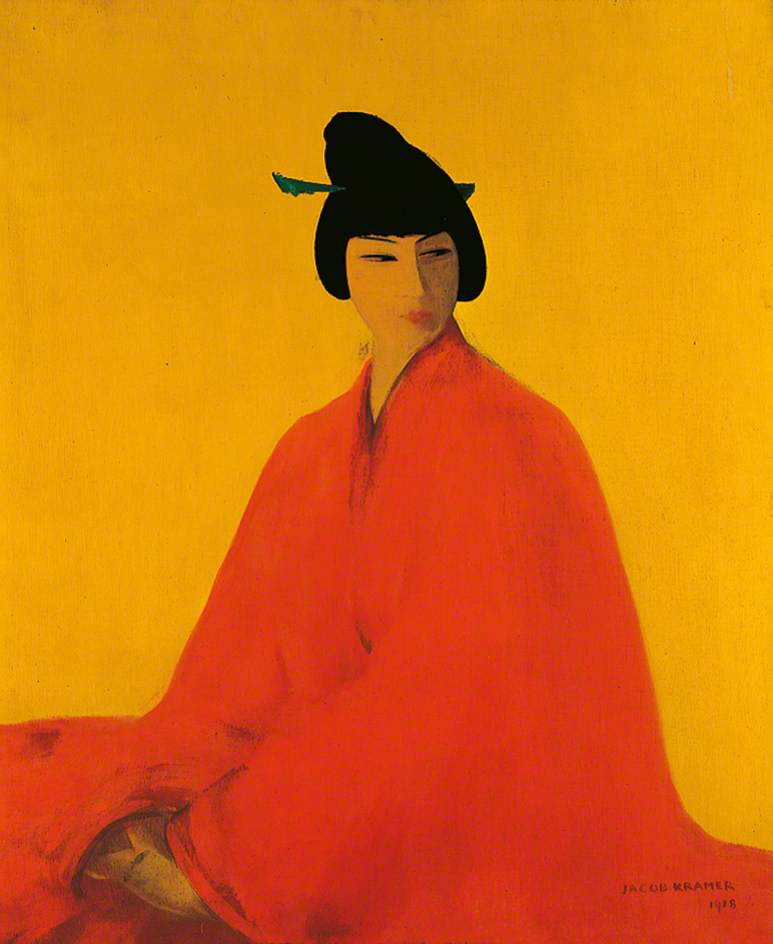
Kramer, A Japanese Girl (1918)

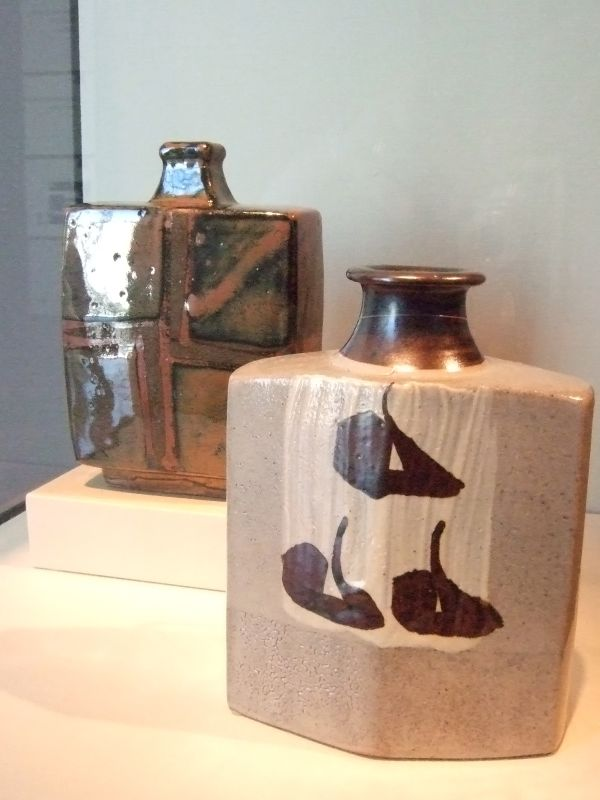
Hamada Shoji Mashiko stoneware with iron glaze bottles (1950–1960)

==== The Japanese enclave ====
Part of the new bilateral cultural exchange which replaced the one-way Anglo-Japanese style by way of greater cultural understanding of Japanese art and its history, came from the Japanese community itself in London.

For example, in 1900, Sadajirō Yamanaka open his London Branch of Yamanaka and Co. By 1902, a Japanese exhibition opened in Whitechapel, London, in which Charles Lewis Hind reviewed the watercolours of the Japanese artist working in London Yoshio Markino. Markino would go on to become a successful illustrator in Edwardian Britain, publishing illustrated works such as The Colour of London(1907) and A Japanese Artist in London(1910). The writer Douglas Sladen also frequently collaborated with Markino in his publications. Between 1907 and 1910, Wakana Utagawa visits London to train in watercolour painting and showcase her traditional Japanese brush paintings.

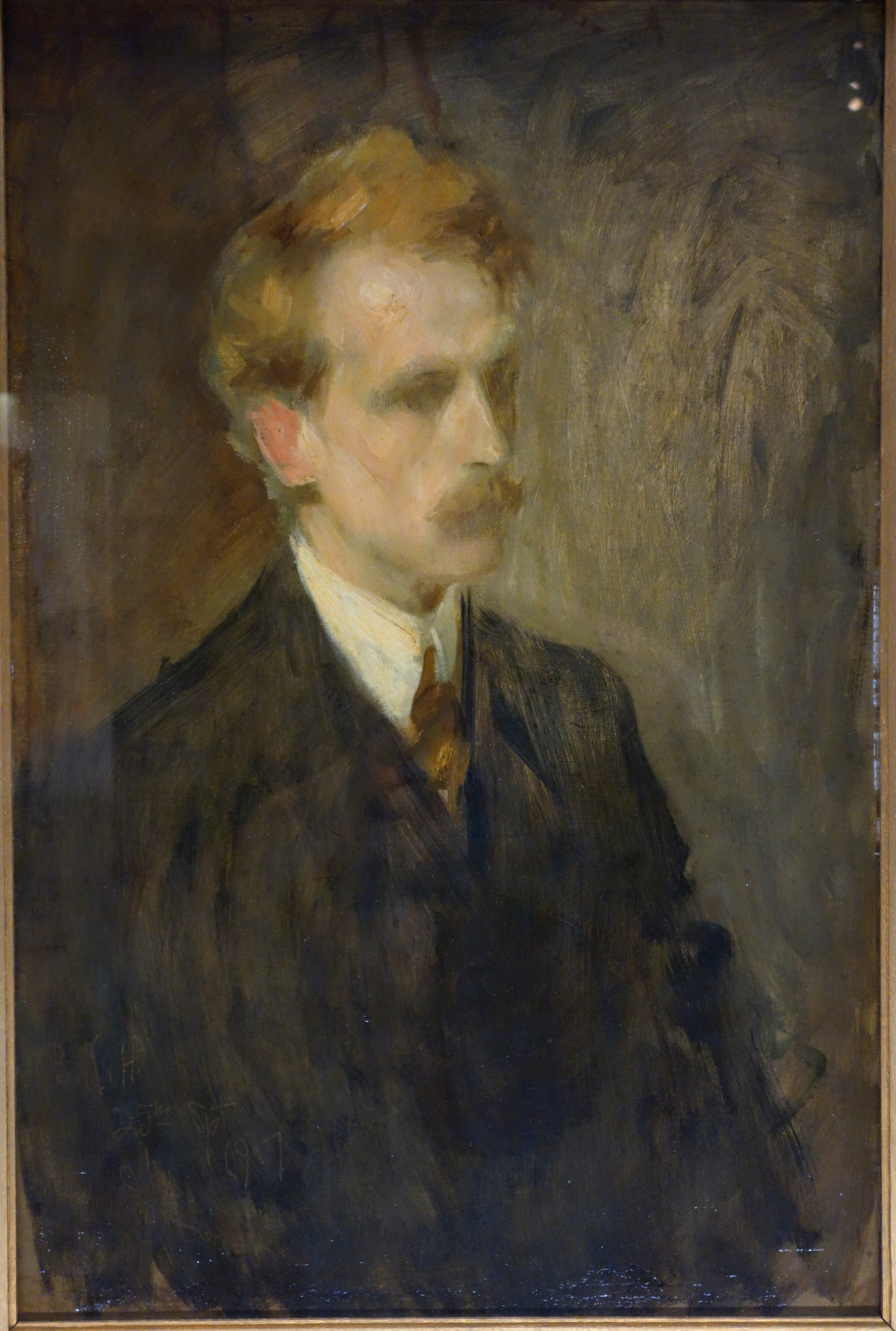
Portrait of the Artist Henry by Hara Busho (1907)

In 1911, Frank Brangwyn had begun to collaborate with various Japanese artists such as Ryuson Chuzo Matsuyama working in Edwardian England on woodblock printing techniques. Then in 1915, the Yamanaka gallery in London hosted the British Red Cross Loan Exhibition. These businessmen, taking advantage of improved international relations, set up shop in Europe and America. Dealers such as Tonying, C. T. Loo (q.v.) and Yamanaka all began to sell East Asian objects directly to Western collectors.

Artist	Start of activity in the UK	End of activity in the UK
Busho Hara	1907	1912
Ryuson Chuzo Matsuyama	1911	1947
Ishibashi Kazunori	1903	1924
Urushibara Mokuchu	1908	1940
Kamisaka Sekka	1901	1908
Yoshio Markino	1897	1942
Wakana Utagawa	1907	1910

== Scotland ==
=== 1870–1879: Glasgow Exhibition ===
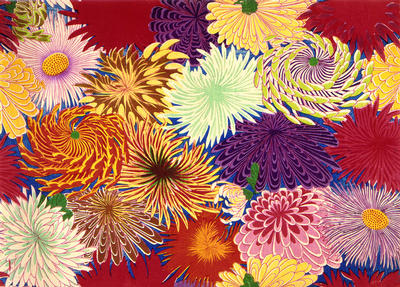
Chiyo-gami paper design exhibited in Glasgow (1878)

In Glasgow, the November 1878 Glasgow Japan Exchange occurs where art goods are traded bilaterally, including 1000 various 'architectural pieces, furniture, wood and lacquer ware, musical instruments, ceramics, metalwork, textiles and costume and paper samples' publicly shown between 1881 and 1882. Bruce James Talbert is also inspired to make Japanese inspired furniture and wallpapers and furnishing fabrics.

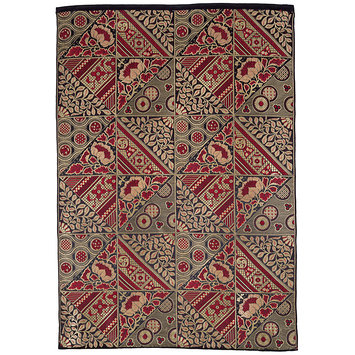
Yesso furnishing fabric (1870)

=== 1880–1889 ===
In December 1881, the Oriental Art Loan Exhibition opened at the Corporation Galleries, showcasing 1,000 art objects from Japan in Glasgow alongside other objects from Liberty & Co and artifacts from the South Kensington Museum, and was seen by 30,000 spectators. Christopher Dresser gave a lecture on Japanese art at an art gallery in Glasgow in 1882 and Liberty became the investor for Art Furnishers' Alliance established by Dresser. In 1883, Frank Dillon (1823–1909); who had visited Japan in 1876; exhibited The Festival of the Cherry Blossom, Osaka, Japan at the Glasgow Institute. In March 1883, Dresser also visited Glasgow to give a lecture on 'Japanese Art Workmanship'. Japan also began exhibiting its goods in the UK, separately exhibiting in 1883, 1884, 1885 in London and in Edinburgh in 1884. Alexander Reid was an art dealer who opened an art gallery named "La Sociète des Beaux-Arts" in 1889, being most remembered for being an acquaintance of Vincent van Gogh, they both began to be influenced by Japanese wares in 1887.

=== 1890–1899: School of Art ===
George Henry and E. A. Hornel, both graduates of Glasgow School of Art, went on a trip funded by Reid to Japan from 1893 to 1894. Upon their return, they held a lecture and exhibition about the paintings produced as a result of their visit to Japan at the Art Club. The Art Club had just been renovated by Mackintosh in 1893 and had become an important social space for artists in Glasgow. Hornel being a good friend of John Keppie, a partner of Mackintosh being colleagues at the Glasgow School of Art, that Mackintosh may have attended this exhibition and lecture. Henry's lectures thus in 1895 furthered the western interest and narrative in Japanese arts as decorative.

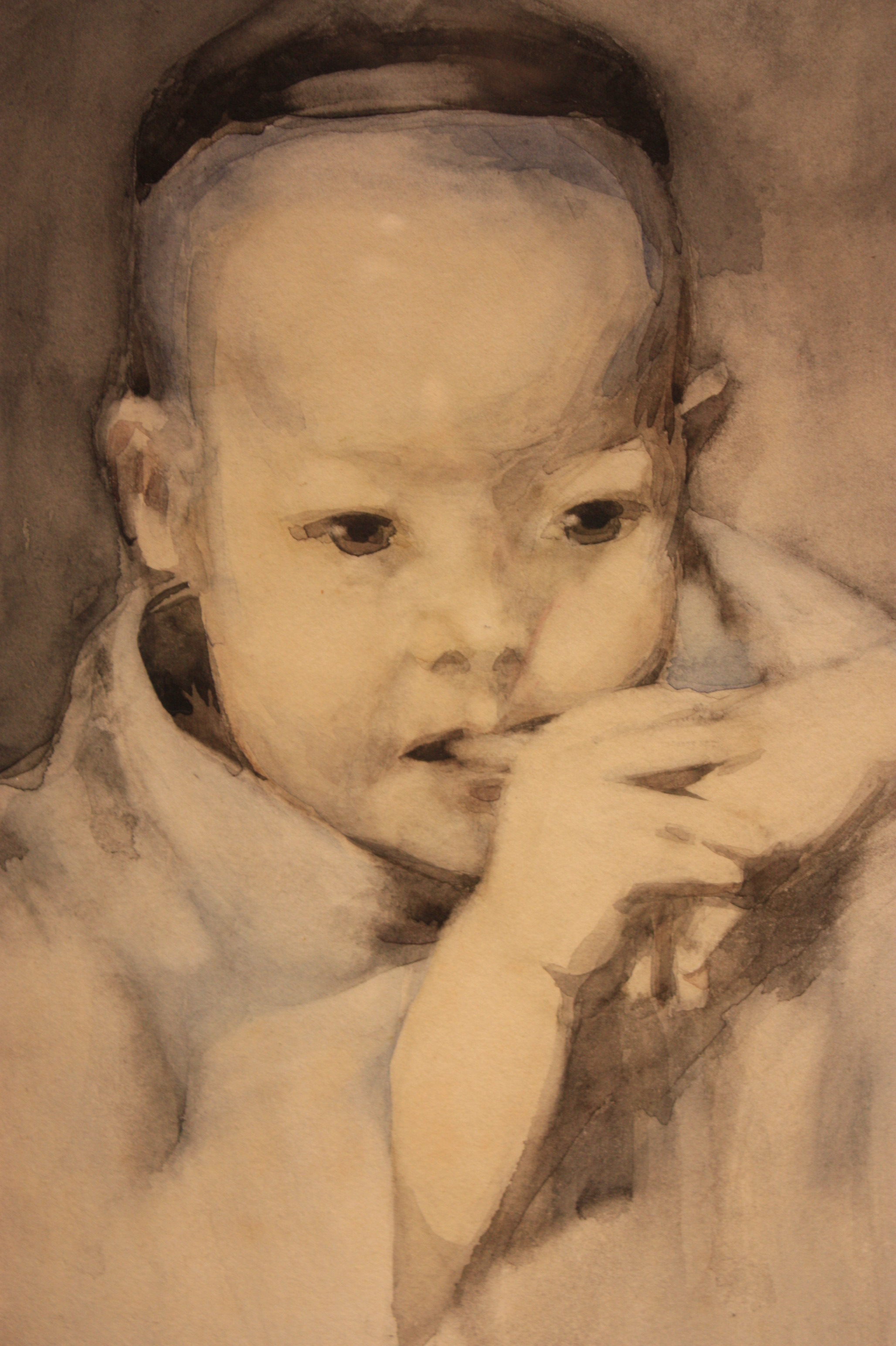
Henry, The Japanese Baby (1893)

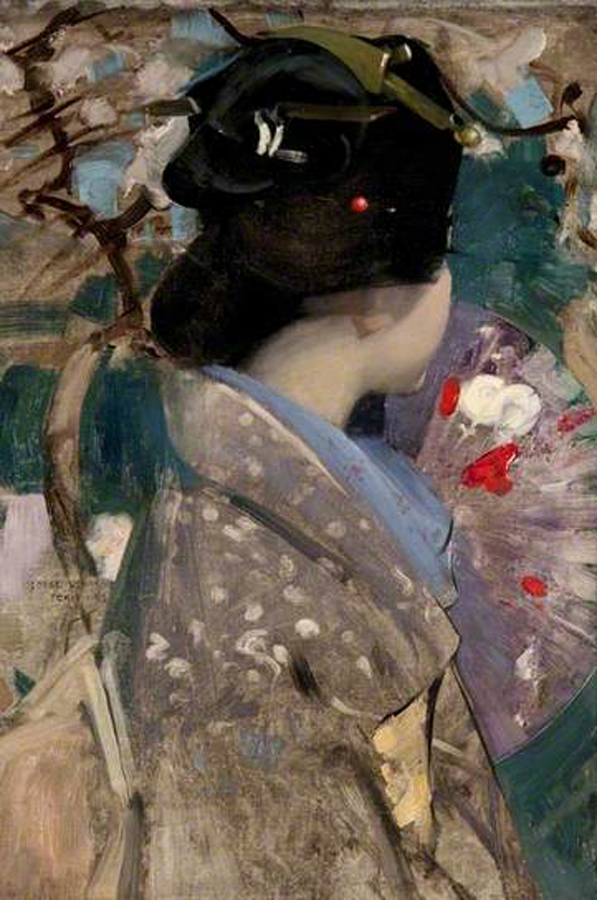
Henry, Japanese woman with a fan (1893–1894)

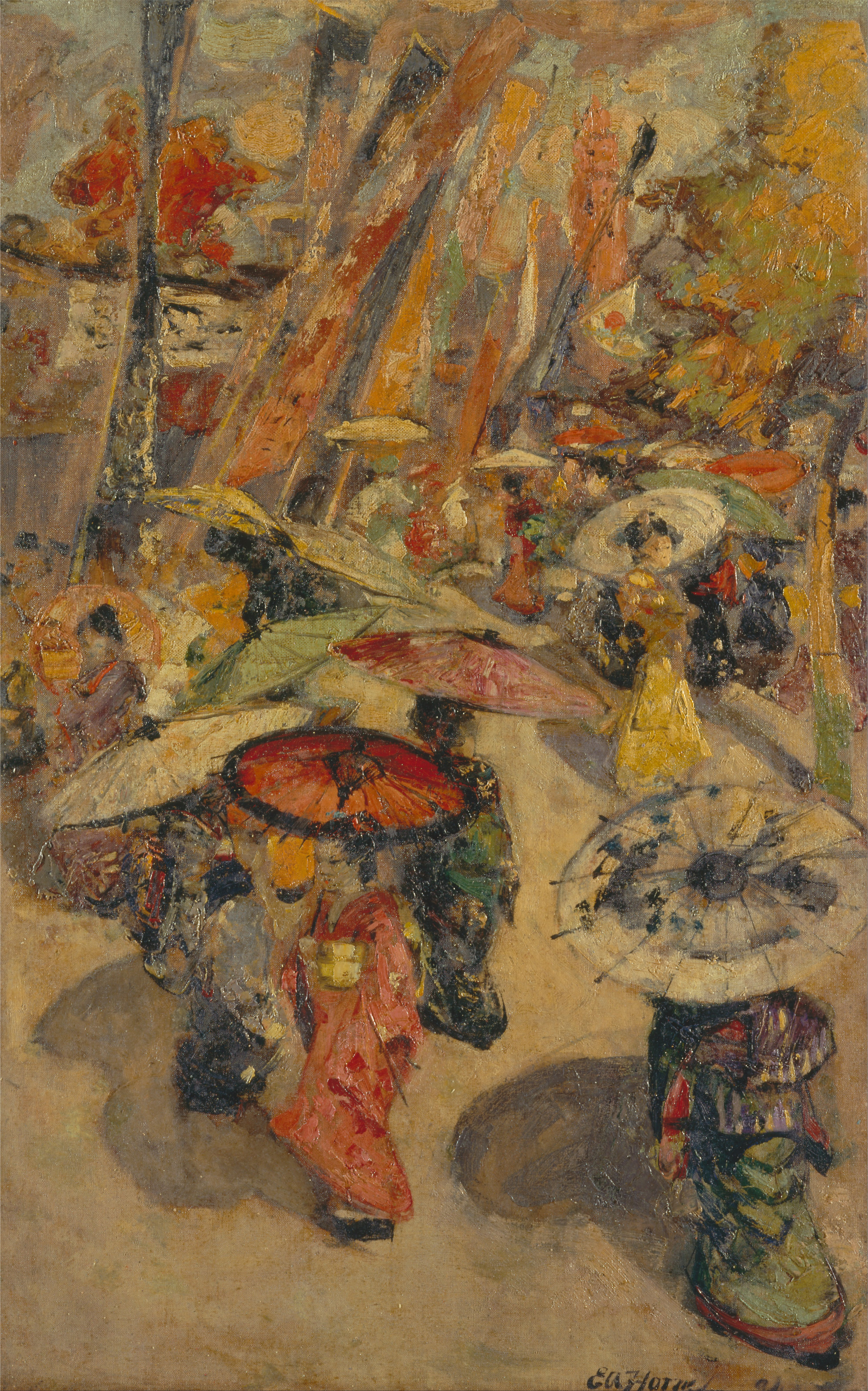
Hornel, – Street Scene (1894)

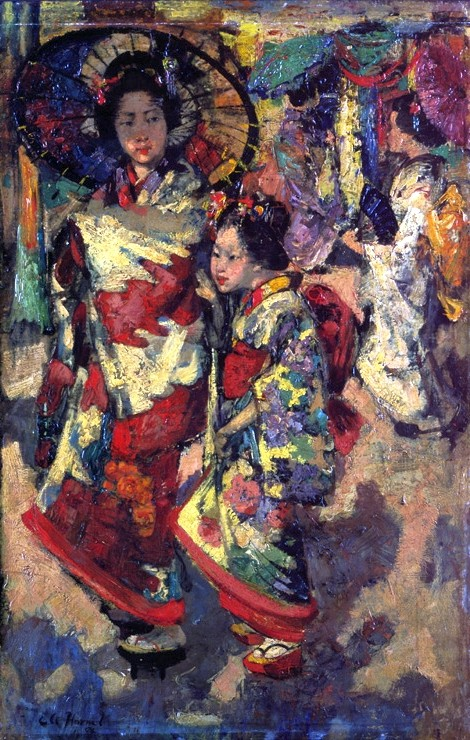
Hornel, Two Geisha Girls (1894)

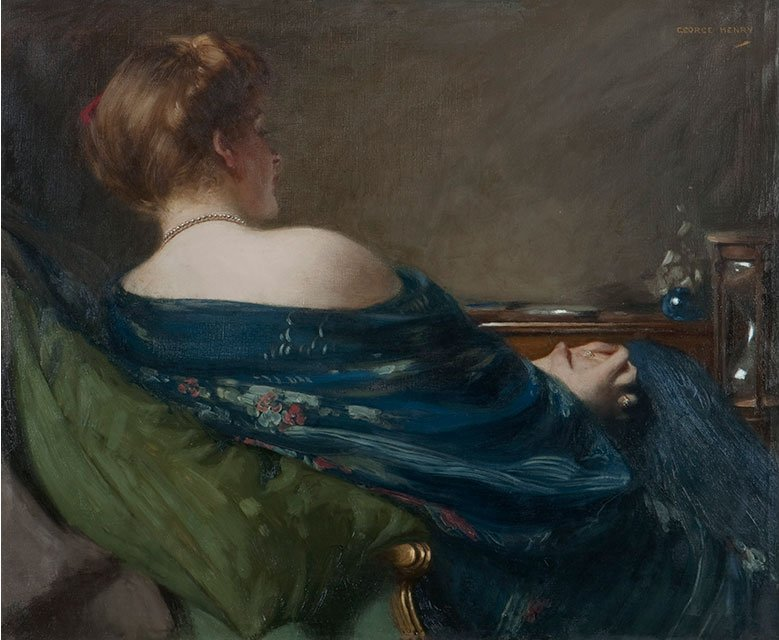
Henry, The Hour-Glass (c. 1899)

=== 1900–1909: Glasgow and the Modern Style ===
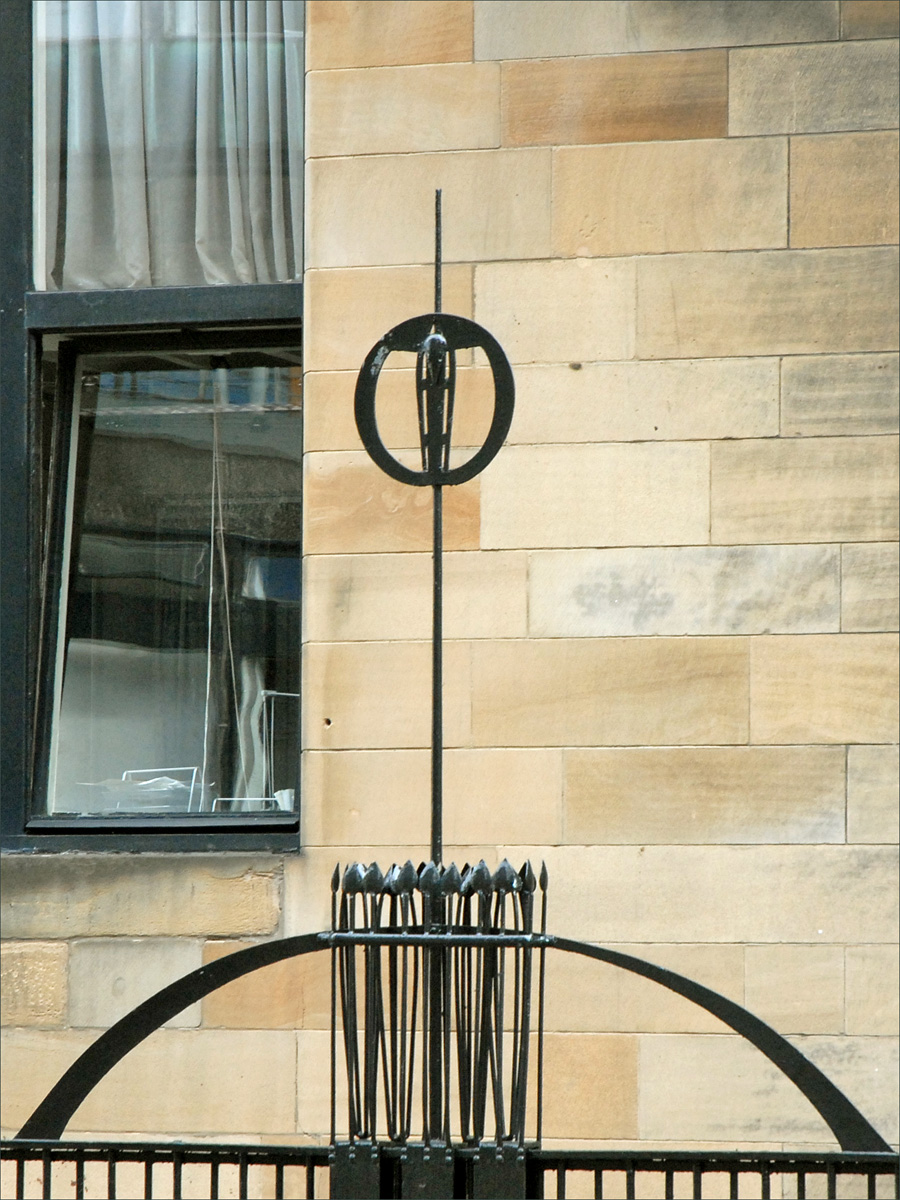
Glasgow School of Art 'Mon' Decorative Metalwork by Mackintosh

Glasgow International Exhibition in 1901 included a Japan Exhibition.

==== Mackintosh and Japan ====
Mackintosh first became acquainted with Japanese design in 1884 at the Glasgow school of Art, producing a Japanese inspired work in Part Seen, Part Imagined in 1896 shown in the kimono style garment portrayed, and also submitting architectural designs to the Glasgow School of Art inspired by the Mon crests based on 'Kinuo Tanaka's I-Ro-Ha Mon-Cho' (or 1881 edition Catalogue of Mon) and on the 'temporary nature of Japanese joinery'. He is thought to have been introduced to Japonisme by Hermann Muthesius in 1897. In turn, he influenced the arts of Siegfried Bing and Gustav Klimt, with his influence on the European circle of Viennese designers who took inspiration in his blending of Celtic and Japanese motif designs. It is particular noticeable of 'the relationship between Mackintosh and Japan from the interior design of the 120 Mains Street flat' of 1900 and in his kimono cabinet (c. 1906). Notably, 'Japan has played an important role in triggering [the] ideas of modernism, when [Mackintosh also] attracted most attention' at the turn of the 20th century in his designs in Continental Europe.

== United States ==
In the United States, early appreciation of the Anglo-Japanese style was also transferred over in the posthumous publications of Charles Locke Eastlake's Hints on Household Taste (first published in 1868).

When I look into the windows of a fashionable establishment devoted to decorative art, and see the monstrosities which are daily offered to the public in the name of taste ... which pass for ornament in the nineteenth century – I cannot help thinking how much we might learn from those nations whose art it has long been our custom to despise[, such as] from the half-civilised craftsmen of Japan

The Aesthetics brought Japanese influences to the United States. Some of the glass and silverwork by Louis Comfort Tiffany, textiles and wallpaper by Candace Wheeler, and the furniture of Kimbel & Cabus, Daniel Pabst, Nimura & Sato, and the Herter Brothers (particularly that produced after 1870) shows influence of the Anglo-Japanese style. The Herter Brothers drew heavily from the furniture of Godwin and Dresser in their motifs and asymmetrical design, but American Anglo-Japanese styles lent towards the older more favoured heavily decorative and ornamental Victorian styles.

Beginning in 1877, Godwin began publishing his Art Furniture Catalogue, which popularised Japanese motifs in the United States until the late 1880s, and Dresser became the first designer to visit and design using Japanese decorative art styles, influencing the style in the Occident. Oscar Wilde also reported and commented upon the progress of the style, referring to "the influence which Eastern art is having on us in Europe, and the fascination of all Japanese work" in a lecture he gave in the United States in 1882 (The English Renaissance of Art).

By 1893 however the 'Japan Craze, despite its intensity, never amounted to more than dilettantish fascination in the quest for the artful [aesthetical] interior and the identity it imbued.'

=== Anglo-Japanese works in the United States ===
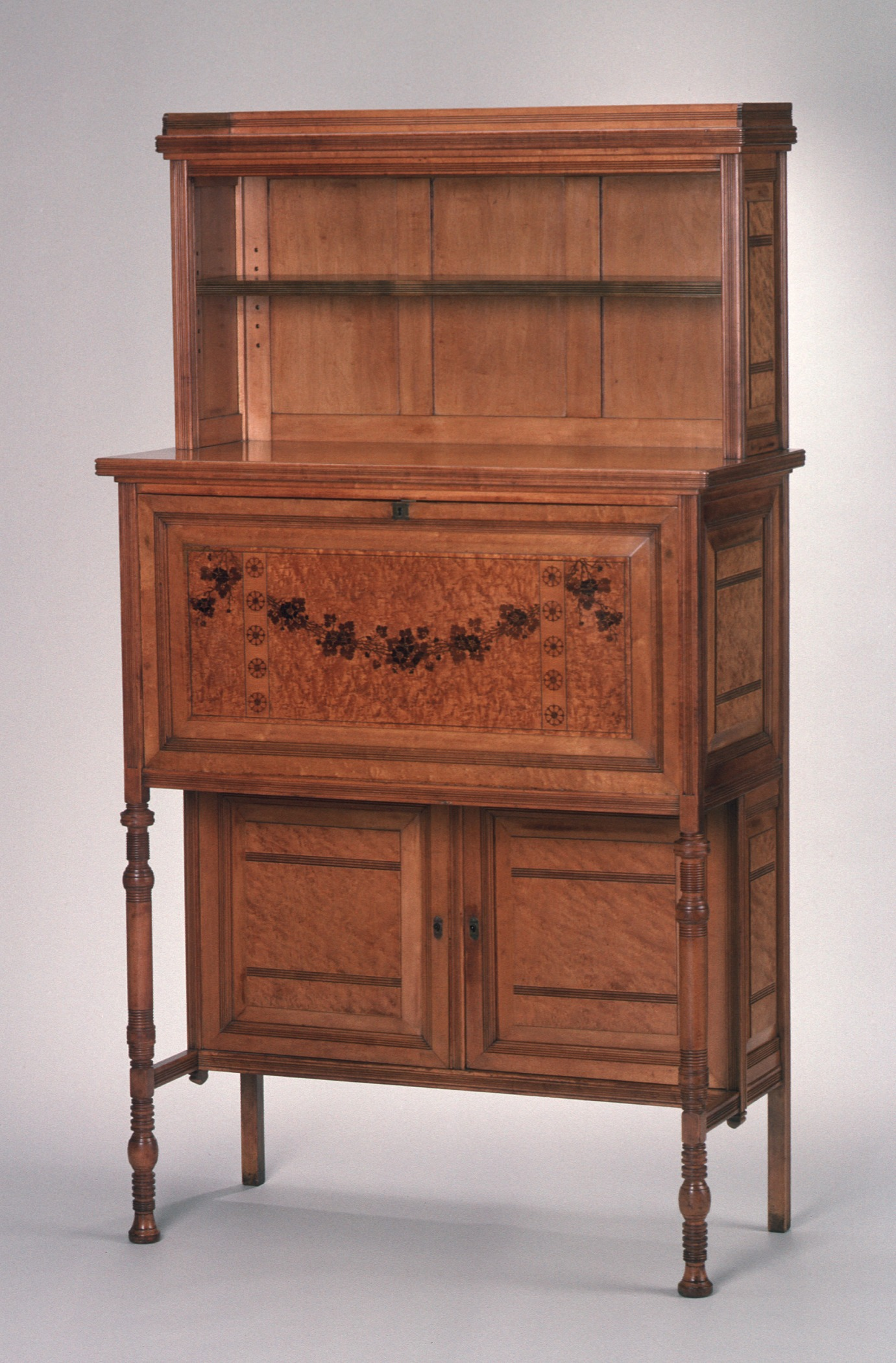
Fall-front desk, Herter Brothers (c. 1865–1905)

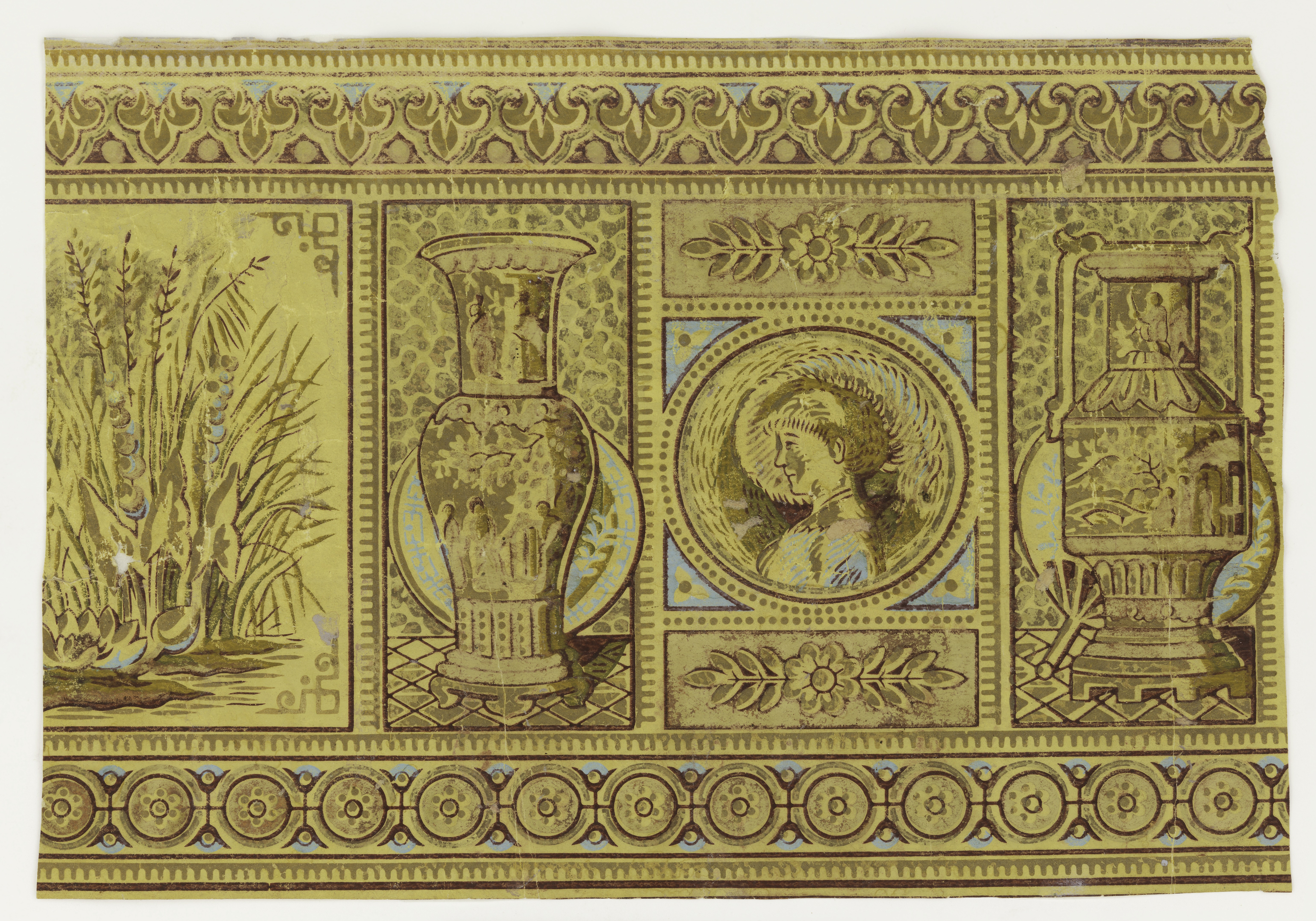
American Wallpaper, (c.1885)

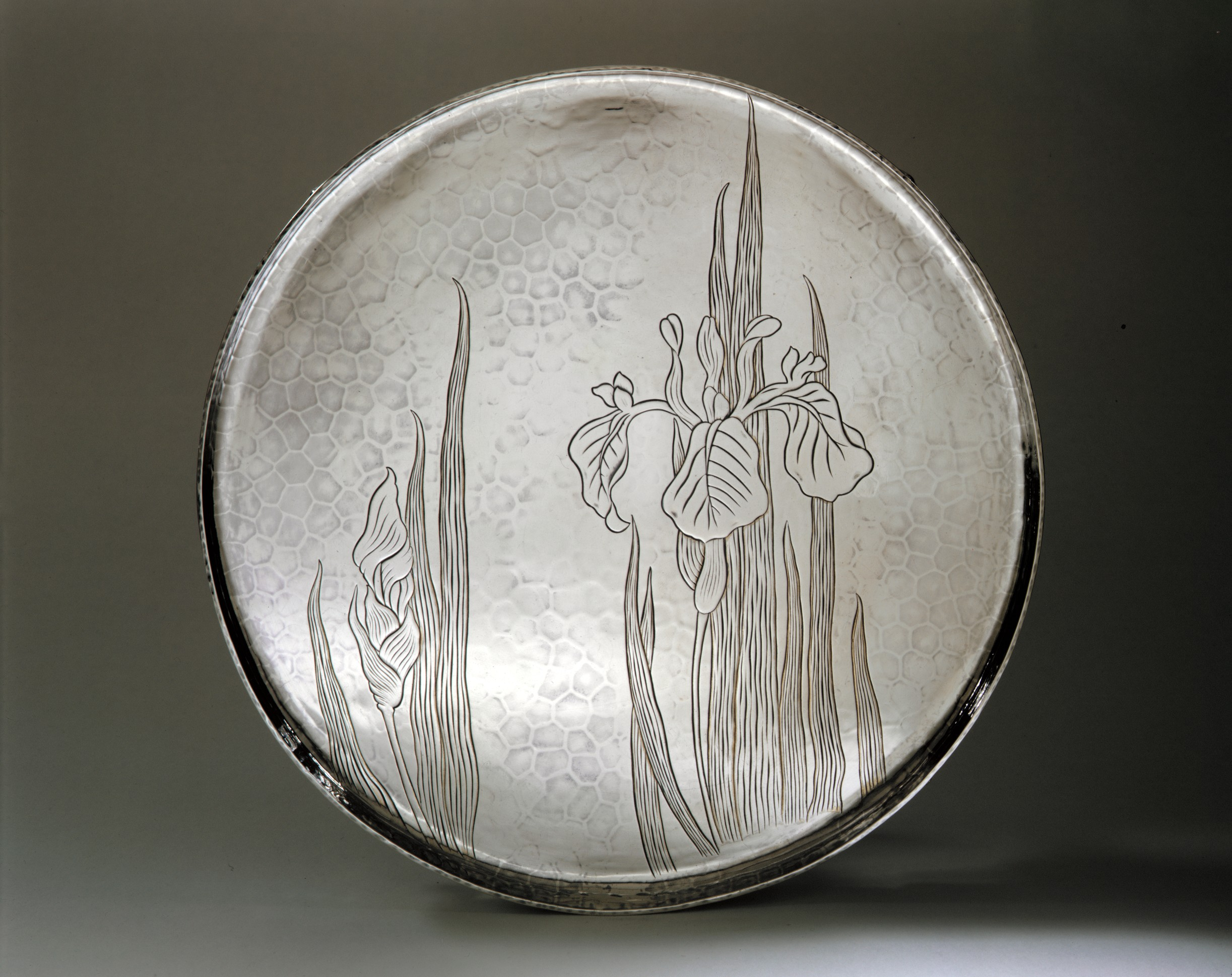
Silver plate with iris motif, by Tiffany & Company (1879)

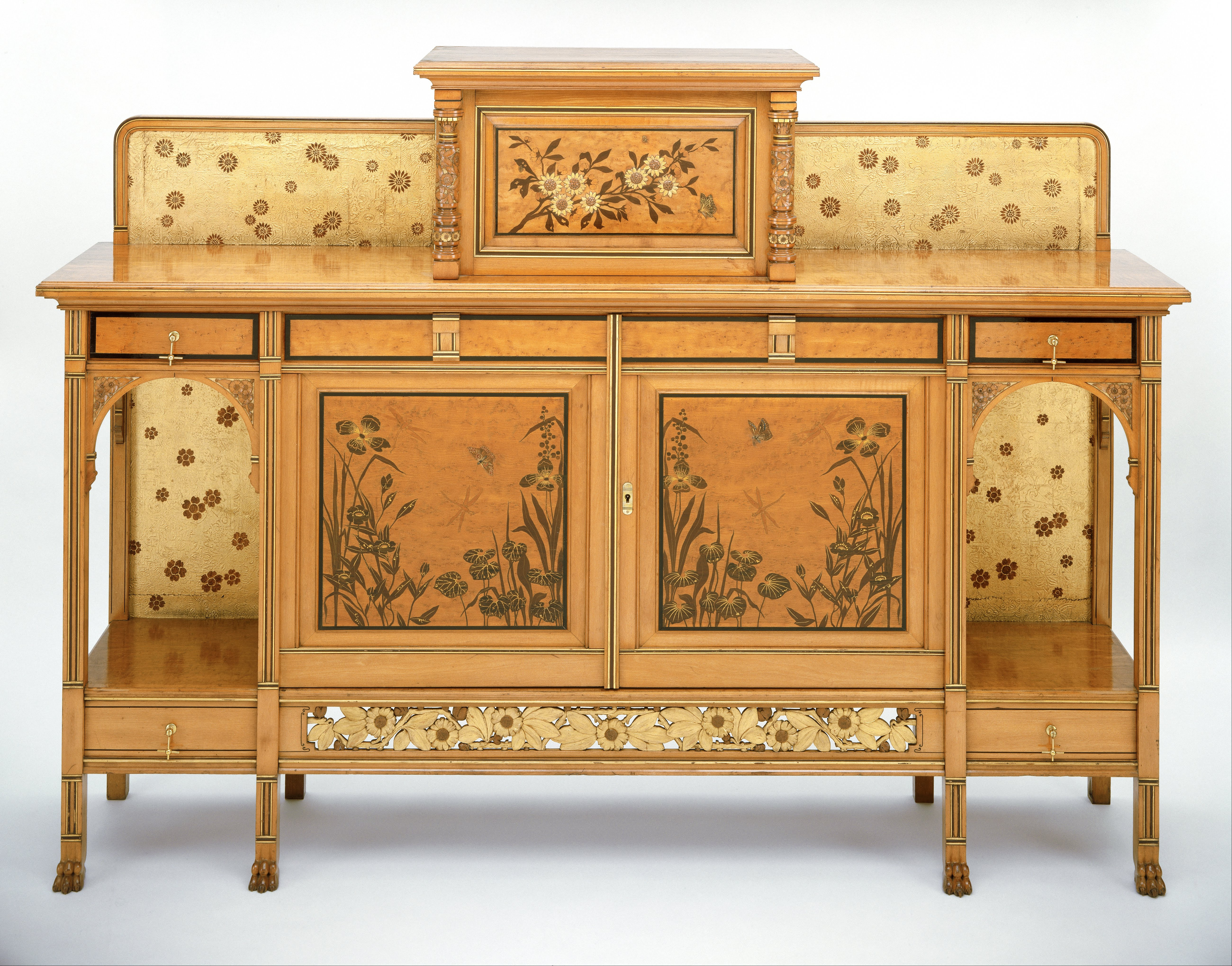
Cabinet by Herter Brothers (c. 1880)

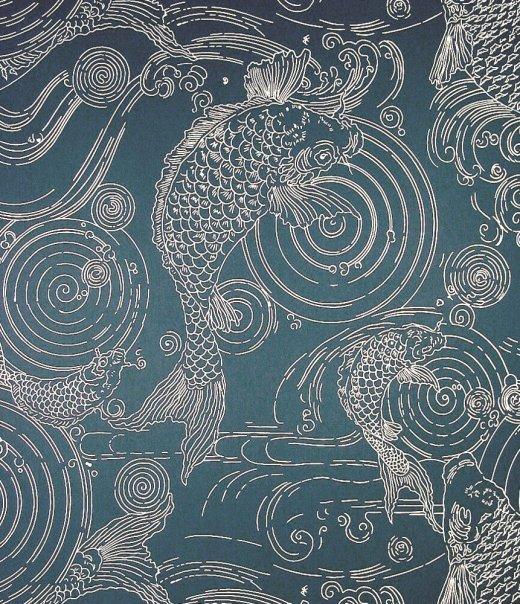
Stencil for wallpaper with Japanese carp motif, by Candace Wheeler (c. 1885–1905)

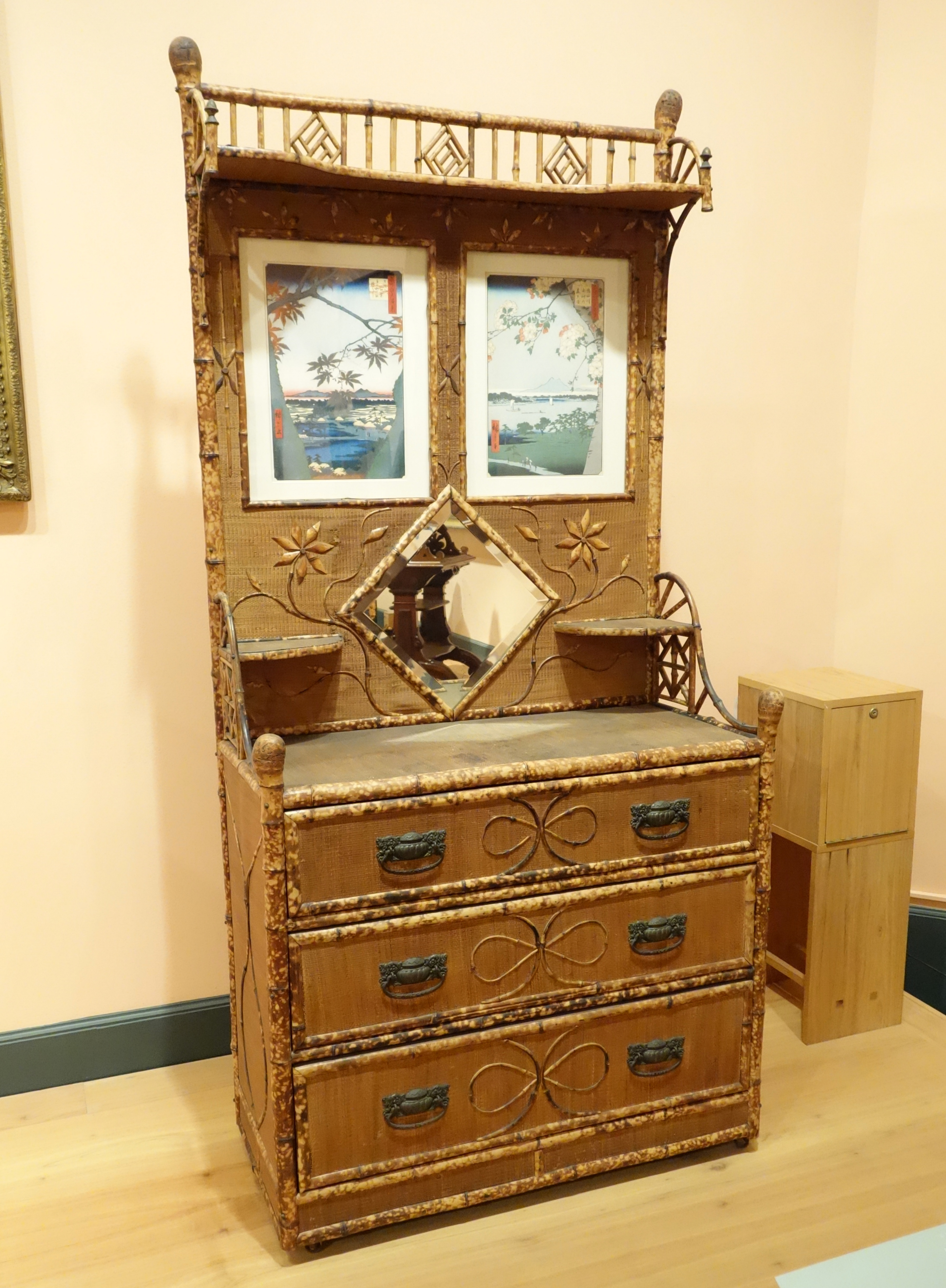
Chest of drawers, by Nimura & Sato, 1905

== See also ==
- Lafcadio Hearn, Author
- Charles Rennie Mackintosh, Designer (see the Kimono Cabinet, circa 1906)
- Molly Verney, 17th century Japanner
- Japanophile
- Orientalism
