= Arthur Silver =

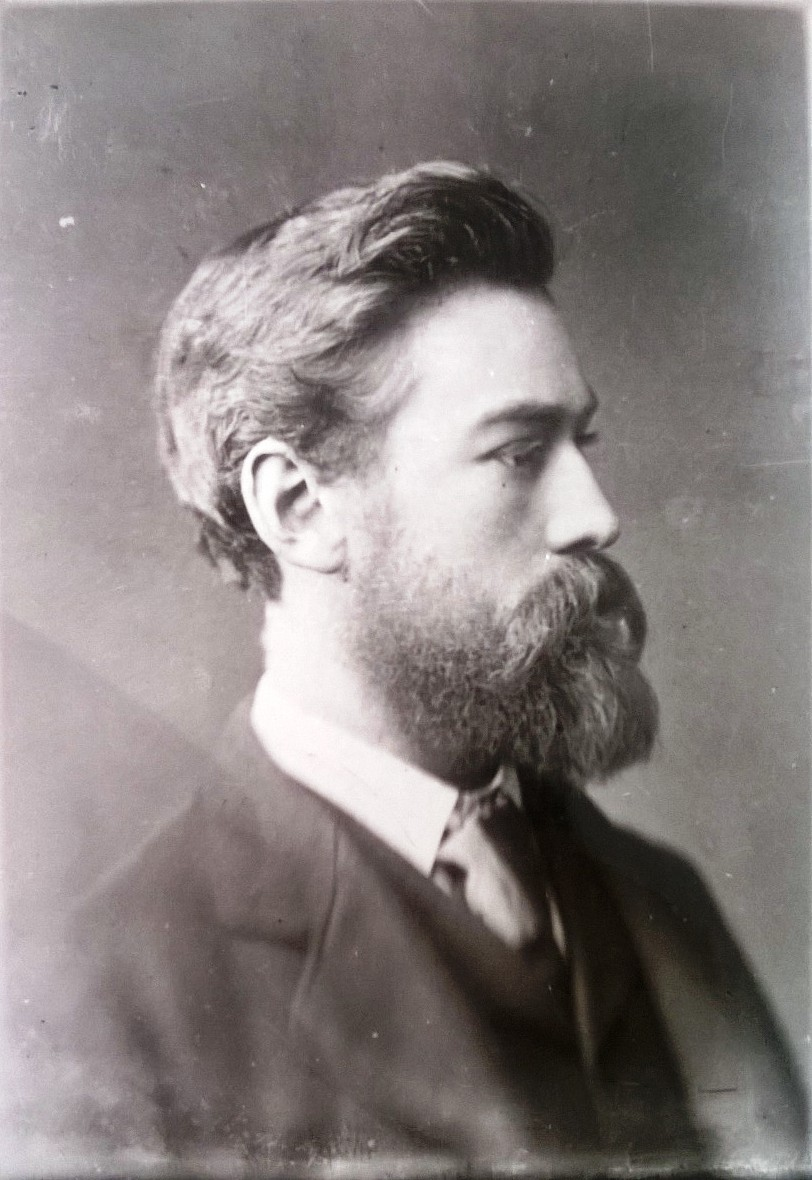
Arthur Silver (1853-1896)

Arthur Silver (1853–1896) was a designer and founder of the Silver Studio. He was born in Reading, Berkshire in 1853. His grandfather had been in the cabinet-making business and his father, James Silver, was an upholsterer.

== Education ==
In 1869, Arthur attended Reading School of Art, which had been founded by Sir Henry Cole with the aim of training designers in both art and industry. He won a prize for the elementary section of the Introduction in Art course.

After leaving art school Arthur Silver was apprenticed to furniture designer Henry William Batley.

== Marriage and family life ==
In 1878, at the age of 25, Arthur Silver married Isabella Walenn. Isabella came from a large and artistically creative family. Her father was the scientist William Henry Walenn, and several of her siblings were notable musicians: Herbert Walenn was Professor of Cello at the Royal Academy of Music, Charles Walenn a singer, Gerald Walenn the first Professor of Violin at the Sydney Conservatoire, Frederick Walenn, a painter, founded the St John's Wood Art School, Dorothea Walenn taught violin at St Paul's Girls' School and Ellie Walenn was a valued teacher at Roedean School. Isabella was no exception to the rule - she inherited the Walenn love of music and spent many years with the Royal Choral Society.

Arthur and Isabella had five children:

- Reginald (Rex) Silver (1879-1965)
- Arthur Silver (1880–
- Harry Silver (1881–1971)
- Christine Silver (1883–1960)
- Ellen Margerine Silver (1886–1906)

Rex Silver was to take over the running of the Silver Studio after his father's death.

== Career ==
Arthur Silver established his own company, the Silver Studio, in Brook Green, Hammersmith in 1880. The Studio produced designs for wallpapers and textiles which they sold to clients such as Liberty (department store),

In 1890, Arthur Silver produced a series of photographic reproductions of items from the South Kensington Museum, intended as inspiration for textile manufacturers, his clients.

In 1893, he was commissioned to design the silks for the wedding dress of Princess Mary of Teck, which were woven by Warner & Sons, a firm with which he worked regularly.

In 1894, he contributed two chapters to Joseph Gleeson White's book on Practical Designing, demonstrating his mastery of the technical aspects of designing for commercial production.

Silver was an avid collector of visual source material. He was a member of The Japan Society of the UK, and the materials he acquired included around four hundred Ise-katagami, or Japanese stencils, which he used as inspiration for his designs.

== Silver Studio Collection ==
The Silver Studio Collection is now part of MoDA, the Museum of Domestic Design and Architecture, part of Middlesex University. It contains around 40,000 designs (for wallpapers, textiles, carpets and other domestic furnishings), 5,000 wallpaper samples, 5,000 textile samples, a library of books on design, architecture and decoration, daybooks, trade cards and other printed ephemera.
