= Christine Silver =

British actress and playwright (1883–1960)

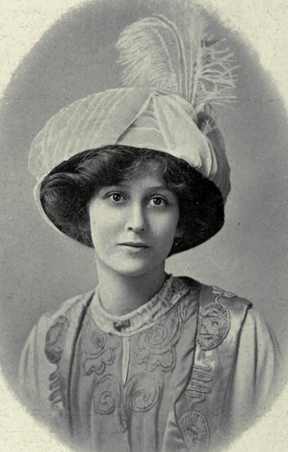
- Silver, from a 1910 publication
- Born: Christine Isie Silver; 17 December 1883; Fulham, London
- Died: 23 November 1960 (aged 76); Kensington, London
- Occupations: Actress, playwright

Christine Isie Silver (17 December 1883 – 23 November 1960) was a British stage, film and television actress, and a playwright.

== Early life ==
Christine Isie Silver was born in 1883 (some sources give 1884) in Fulham, London, the daughter of Arthur Silver and Isabella Charlotte Walenn Silver. Her father was a textile designer. Her maternal grandfather was scientist William Henry Walenn, and her uncles included singer and actor Charles Walenn and composer Gerald Walenn.

== Career ==
Silver began acting as a teenager, working on the London stage by 1902. She appeared in Peter Pan (1904), The Lion and the Mouse (1907), Diana of Dobson's (1908), An Englishman's Home (1909), The Speckled Band (1910), George Bernard Shaw's Fanny's First Play (1911), A Midsummer Night's Dream (1913), The Sister-in-Law (1916), Betty at Bay (1918), The Mayor of Casterbridge (1926), and the title role in Thomas Hardy's Tess of the d'Urbervilles. Later roles included parts in The Cathedral (1930), The Cradle Song (1931), Barnet's Folly (1935) The Unveiling (1938), and A Trip to Scarborough (1944).

Silver was in several silent films, including The Pleydell Mystery (1916), The Labour Leader (1917), The Little Welsh Girl (1920), and Judge Not (1920). She made the transition to sound films as a character actress, with roles in Dead Men Tell No Tales (1938), Salute John Citizen (1942), Those Kids from Town (1942), Heaven is Round the Corner (1944), Room to Let (1950), and Companions in Crime (1954), and The Hornet's Nest, in 1955, as Becky Crumb, which was her last feature film rôle, with Nora Nicholson.

She was heard on radio programmes in the 1920s and 1930s, and seen on television in the 1940s and 1950s.

Silver also wrote a play, Doorsteps (1915), which was adapted into a silent film, Chicken Casey (1917).

== Personal life ==
Silver married twice. Her first husband was her manager, Walter Maxwell; they married in 1908, and had a daughter Ellen Barbara Maxwell Sturgis (1912-2004), before they divorced. Her second husband was Roland Sturgis, the son of American-born writer Julian Russell Sturgis and brother of government official Mark Grant-Sturgis. They married in 1918. She died in 1960, aged 76 years, in Kensington, London.
