= Alice Barth =

English operatic soprano (1848–1910)

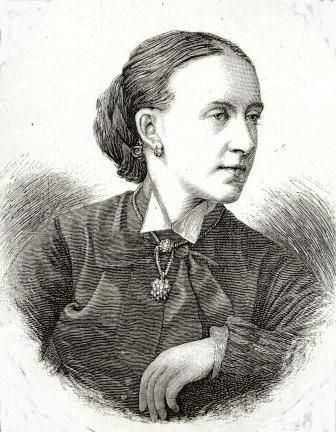
Alice Mary Barth - The Illustrated Sporting and Dramatic News (1881)

Alice Mary Barth (25 August 1848 – 18 July 1910) was an English operatic soprano who for some years was a member of the Carl Rosa Opera Company and who during the 1880s managed her own troupe, the Alice Barth Opera Company.

== Early life and career ==
She was born in the St Pancras area of London in 1848, the youngest of five children of Sarah Jane née Wheeler (1810–1870) and George Harman Barth (1807–1869), who began his career as a perfumer but by 1851 was describing himself as a mesmerist, treating patients in his home. From this he progressed to treating ailments through the use of undefined ‘gases’, in 1854 patenting ‘improvements in an apparatus for administering and supplying and purifying gases or vapours for medicinal and other purposes’. In 1861 he described himself as an 'operative chemist and lecturer'. She was the aunt of the D'Oyly Carte Opera Company performer Charles Walenn through his mother, Skene Charlotte Walenn (1837–1927), Barth's sister.

She and her older sister Kate initially studied singing with Lucy Fosbroke (1836–1870), making their concert début in January 1869 with Fosbroke at Myddelton Hall; in May of that year they again appeared in Lucy Fosbroke's own concert where Alice Barth sang Ganz's 'Since Yesterday' and with her sister sang the duet ‘The Fan’. Later she studied singing with the tenor Charles Manvers and following the death of her parents within a year of each other she decided to pursue a career as an operatic soprano. In 1871 she was listed as a 'Teacher of Music'.

After taking lessons from Alberto Randegger among others she launched her career, appearing in burlesques, the concert platform, in operetta and oratorio. In May 1871 at the Royal Polytechnic Institution she sang Irish ballads in John Henry Pepper's production A Trip to the West Highlands of Ireland. She was to return to the Royal Polytechnic Institution frequently over the next 18 months where she became a popular favourite, on another occasion appearing there on the same bill as Pepper himself and George Grossmith. She made her début in English opera at The Crystal Palace in 1873, singing Sally Silver in Satanella and as Donna Elvira in Mozart's Don Giovanni, returning there in September 1874 when she sang in an Offenbach double-bill of Vent du soir, ou L'horrible festin and Rouge et Noir.

On 8 October 1874 she married civil engineer Frederick William Usher (1843–1889) at the Old Church in Saint Pancras. Her marriage resulted in a two-year break in her theatrical career during which she had their son Frank Usher (1876–1912), but by 1876 as 'Madam Barth' she returned to singing, firstly at the Royal Polytechnic Institution in the operetta Courtship Under Difficulties before appearing on the concert platform at the Royal Aquarium Theatre, at Freemasons' Hall, St James's Hall and the Brighton Aquarium among others, later returning to The Crystal Palace in August 1877 where she sang Donna Elvira in Don Giovanni. She was in Guy Mannering and was Adina in L'elisir d'amore before taking part in the first English-language performance of Mozart's Der Schauspieldirektor in September 1877 which had been adapted into English as The Manager. In the Autumn of 1877 she toured with the Crystal Palace Company before returning to London with them in December that year to appear in Il matrimonio segreto. She next appeared in an English-language opera season at Her Majesty's Theatre where she appeared as Anne Chute in The Lily of Killarney before playing Arline in The Bohemian Girl.

== Alice Barth Opera Company ==
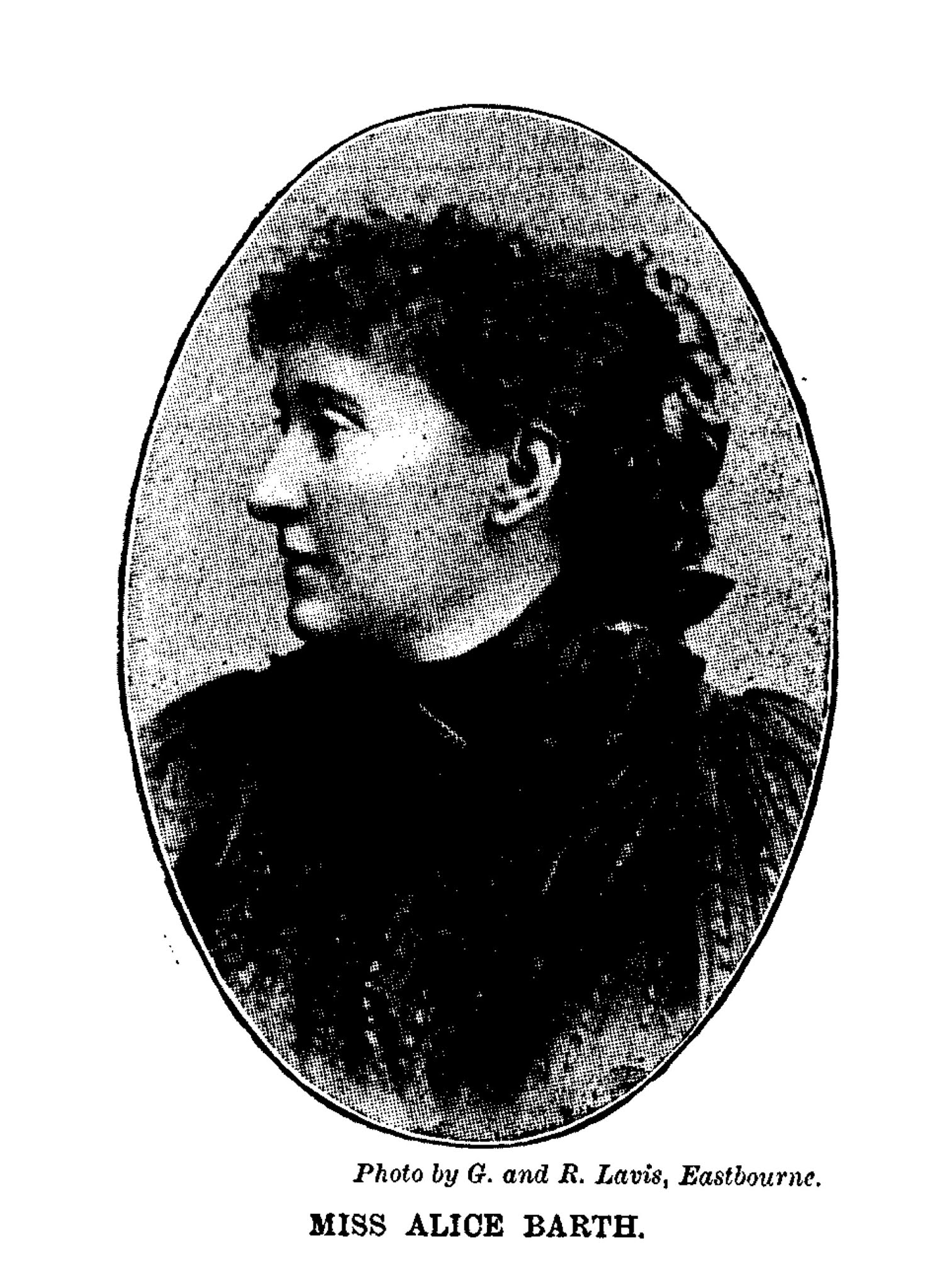
Alice Mary Barth

After singing engagements in Brighton, Blackpool, Margate and Windsor among other towns, in April 1879 Barth managed a small tour of drawing room operettas including Virginia Gabriel's Widows Bewitched, which would become a popular favourite in her repertoire, and Forty Winks, an English-language adaptation of Offenbach's Une nuit blanche. In 1880 she was performing with Sims Reeves in ballad opera and during the early 1880s she was managing her own touring troupe, the Alice Barth Opera Company, which included Richard Temple and Eric Lewis among the cast. Over the next few years Barth's troupe would become well known on the southern touring circuits while also making regular appearances at The Crystal Palace and Alexandra Palace. In 1880 she added The Sleeping Queen to her Company's repertoire in addition to the Garden Scene from Faust, Massé's Les noces de Jeannette (adapted as Haste to the Wedding) and Offenbach's The Rose of Auvergne.

Between engagements with her own Company Barth joined other small touring companies including that of Traverner and Walsham for whom she appeared at the Royal Opera House in Covent Garden and at Hengler's promenade concerts. She sang in Elijah at Lancaster (1880) while in August 1881 she returned to her own Company in the new musical sketch Cross Purposes. When the Royal Polytechnic Institution announced it was closing Barth's Company, they played Widows Bewitched as the venue's final performances in September 1881; she was Josephine in H.M.S. Pinafore at the Alexandra Palace in November 1881. In February 1882 at Brighton Barth produced a new work for her Company, Frederick Corder's A Storm in a Teacup.

Such was her fame as a drawing room entertainer that Barth was booked by Alfred Reed and Corney Grain to appear as Arabella Upshott in the German Reed Entertainments production of The Head of the Poll at St. George's Hall. During 1882 and 1883 the Alice Barth Opera Company toured Britain playing in such works as Quid pro Quo, The Chalet, Dr Miracle, A Fair Encounter, The Loan of a Lover, The Captain of the Guard and at times a shortened version of Il trovatore. Barth temporarily left her Company to play ‘Mirth, a good fairy’ in the pantomime Beauty and the Beast at the Theatre Royal in Sheffield (1883). She sang in whatever work interested her, irrespective of genre. In 1884 she sang again in the promenade concerts at the Royal Aquarium Theatre, was Wilhelmina in Dibdin's The Waterman in a benefit performance, and with her own Company produced a new operetta, This House to Let at Brighton in June 1884. September of that year saw Barth as co-prima donna opposite Blanche Cole with the Royal English Opera Company, singing Susanna in The Marriage of Figaro, the title role in Maritana, Arline in The Bohemian Girl and Diana in The Crown Diamonds.

From May 1885 Barth undertook another tour with her own Company which performed Corder's The Nabob's Pickle (1883), Ganymede and Galatea, The Waterman and Corder's The Noble Savage (1885) before she appeared in the pantomime Dick Whittington at Worcester following which she rejoined the Royal English Opera Company for whom she sang Amina in La Sonnambula. In 1887 the Alice Barth Opera Company was touring once again with Gounod's La colombe (as The Pet Dove) and Don Pasquale added to the repertoire, but following the sudden death of the company's principal tenor the tour was forced to close. Alice Barth then joined the English Opera Company for whom she appeared as Arline, Maritana and Susanna.

== Carl Rosa Opera Company ==
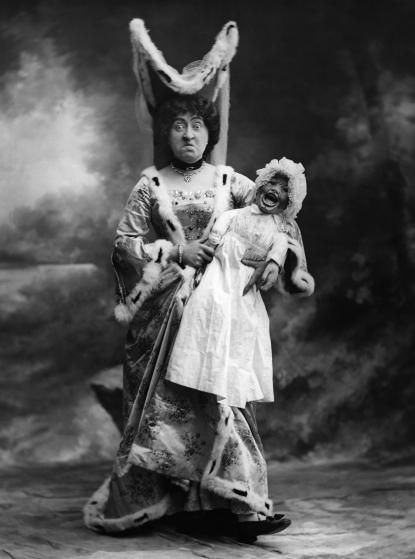
As The Duchess in Alice in Wonderland at the Prince of Wales's Theatre (1906)

In March 1885 Barth joined the Carl Rosa Opera Company, singing the Countess in Mozart's The Marriage of Figaro at the Theatre Royal, Manchester. She was Donna Anna in Don Giovanni in Glasgow and Eily O’Connor in The Lily of Killarney at Bradford before joining another Carl Rosa touring company in 1891 as Paquita in Carmen, the Countess in The Daughter of the Regiment and the title role in Maritana before briefly returning to the main Carl Rosa company. In early 1892 she left to appear with the Burns-Crotty Opera Company for whom she sang Clorinda, daughter of Don Magnifico in La Cenerentola under the baton of Henry Wood.

In August 1894 she returned to the Carl Rosa Opera Company at the Grand Theatre, Blackpool where she played the Nurse in Roméo et Juliette by Gounod and created the role of Janet Raistrick in the world premiere of the opera Jeanie Deans by Hamish MacCunn. She toured in Hansel and Gretel by Humperdinck in which she variously played Gertrude, the children's mother and the Witch. By the time she left the company in June 1895 she had played 11 roles in 150 performances. She returned to Carl Rosa briefly in October 1895 to sing Lola in Cavalleria Rusticana at the Theatre Royal, Hanley. In 1895 she is said to have married the actor and vocalist Francis William Campbell Bishop (1853–1929), but no trace of a record for the marriage can be found, and in her Probate documents she is named as 'Usher'.

== Later life ==
Following the rise of musical comedy in the 1890s, Barth's career took a new turn in the new genre when in 1895 she accepted the role of Mrs Honeycombe in a lengthy tour of The Gay Parisienne. She made such a success in the character that she was soon offered a similar role, that of Lady Hawser in The French Maid at Terry's Theatre in London. In 1898 Barth played the Duchess and the Red Queen opposite Rose Hersee as Alice in the musical Alice in Wonderland at the Opera Comique in London. In the 1901 census Barth was listed as a 'Teacher of Music', and from about this time she also worked in and around London as a soloist and as the manager of small concert and opera companies, giving up her management role in 1906. During this period she played Mrs Dingle in Skipped by the Light of the Moon (1899); was the Royal Governess in Little Hans Andersen (1903) at the Adelphi Theatre opposite Walter Passmore and Henry Lytton; and reprised her roles as the Duchess and the Red Queen in the musical Alice in Wonderland at the Prince of Wales's Theatre (1906) opposite Marie Studholme as Alice and again opposite Maidie Andrews as Alice (1907–08) at the Apollo Theatre in London. In March 1907 she was Lady Heldon in Seymour Hicks' production of My Darling at the Hicks Theatre.

Alice Barth died aged 61 at her home in London in 1910 and was buried in Highgate Cemetery. In her will she left £211 14s to her relative William George Walenn, an insurance agent.
