= Herbert Kinsey =

British violinist and composer (1885–1966)

- Born: Herbert Kinze; 3 September 1885; Penge, London, England
- Died: October , 1966 Croydon, London
- Genre: Classical
- Occupations: Musician, professor, composer, author
- Instrument: Violin
- Formerly of: London String Quartet

Herbert Henry Kinsey (Kinze) (3 September 1885 – October 1966) was a British violinist and composer. Kinsey was a founder member and 2nd violinist of the English String Quartet in 1902, and a member of the famed London String Quartet from 1918. He played with the London Symphony Orchestra 1913–1928. His tutor books for the violin have been published by the Associated Board of the Royal Schools of Music since the 1930s.

== Biography ==
Herbert Kinze was born on 3 September 1885 in Penge, England, to Rudolf and Martha Kinze. His father Rudolf was a colonial produce broker and a naturalised British Subject. Herbert changed his German name from Kinze to Kinsey, some time after World War I. The London Symphony Orchestra, where he was the principal second violin, records both versions of his name.

In 1902 he gained an open scholarship to study at the Royal College of Music in London with Enrique Fernández Arbós, and was later a professor of violin, viola and chamber music at the RCM from 1920. In 1950 he was made a Fellow of the Royal College of Music, FRCM. He stepped down as Professor of Viola at the RCM in 1956. From 1921 Kinsey was an examiner for the Associated Board of the Royal Schools of Music (ABRSM).

In 1902, Kinsey, along with Frank Bridge (viola), Thomas F Morris (violin) and Ivor James (cello), founded the English String Quartet. Marjorie Hayward replaced Thomas Morris as first violin from 1911. Ivor James recalls in his memoirs how, in 1904, the quartet were sent by Sir Hubert Parry, director of the RCM, to play the Schumann and Brahms piano quintets with Donald Tovey at 10 Downing Street when Arthur Balfour was Prime Minister. And how a fortnight later, Sir Hubert lined the quartet up in the corridor outside his room at the RCM and put ten golden sovereigns into each of their hands, saying that "Arthur had sent them for the boys!" The following year they went to Mr Balfour's house in Carlton House Terrace where they played the Bach C major Concerto for two pianos (Donald Tovey and James Friskin) with the quartet plus Ernest Tomlinson (violist) and Robert A. Grimson (cellist), together with the Brahms B flat Sextet.

In 1903 he played in the Walenn String Quartet with Gerald Walenn (violin), James Lockyer (viola), and Herbert Walenn (cello). In later years the violist position was held by Lionel Tertis. The quartet was disbanded in 1914 owing to the onset of World War I.

On 19 October 1904, Kinsey on violin, with Frank Bridge (viola), Vera Warwick Evans (violin) and Ivor James (cello) gave what was believed to be the first British premiere of Debussy's String Quartet. In November 1904 Kinsey, along with Frank Bridge on viola, William Armstrong on violin and Ivor James on cello, gave the first performance of Bridge's Novelletten at an RCM students' concert.

In 1908 he played with the newly-formed Marion Scott Quartet, with Sybil Maturin on viola and Ivor James on cello. The quartet was founded by Scott mainly to introduce contemporary British music to London audiences. Their programs at Aeolian Hall featured new works by Charles Villiers Stanford, Frank Bridge, Walford Davies, James Friskin, Hubert Parry, William Hurlstone and others.

In 1913 he performed Maurice Ravel's Introduction and Allegro at the Bechstein Hall (now Wigmore Hall) with the English String Quartet, Gwendolen Mason on harp and Ravel conducting. He later recorded the work, again with Ravel conducting, in 1923.

In March 1919 he performed alongside Lionel Tertis, Felix Salmond, William Murdoch, Marjorie Hayward, and Pedro G. Morales in the English premieres of two works by the Spanish composer Joaquín Turina - his Piano Quintet and his Scéne Andalouse.

In 1919 he founded the Herbert Kinsey String Quartet with Frank Howard, Ernest Tomlinson and Bertie Patterson Parker. In 1925 he formed the Kinsey Piano Quartet, which consisted of Kinsey on violin, Frank Howard on viola; Anthony Pini on cello and Ethel Hobday on piano. Kinsey's wife, Olive Bloom was often the pianist for the quartet. Both quartets performed regularly throughout the 1920s. Kinsey also played with the Charles Woodhouse Quartet with Ernest Yonge and Charles Crabbe.

He published the following violin compositions, and books on violin teaching:

- My First Violin Book; Four Miniature Sketches; Serenade; Six Pieces; Elementary Progressive Studies (Books I - III); 12 Preliminary Studies; Four Little Fairy Pictures; Three Contrasted Pieces; Canzonetta; Elegy for Violin and Pianoforte (1910); Barcarole, for Violin & Pianoforte (1912); The Fisherman's Tale for Violin and Pianoforte (1933); The Foundations of Violin Playing and Musicianship (1954).

He married the pianist Olive Louise Augusta Blume (later Bloom) (1884-1967), a fellow scholar at the RCM, in 1912. Harold Darke played the organ at their wedding.
