= Rowan Road, Hammersmith =

Road in Hammersmith, London

Coordinates: 51.494730°N 0.21967925°W

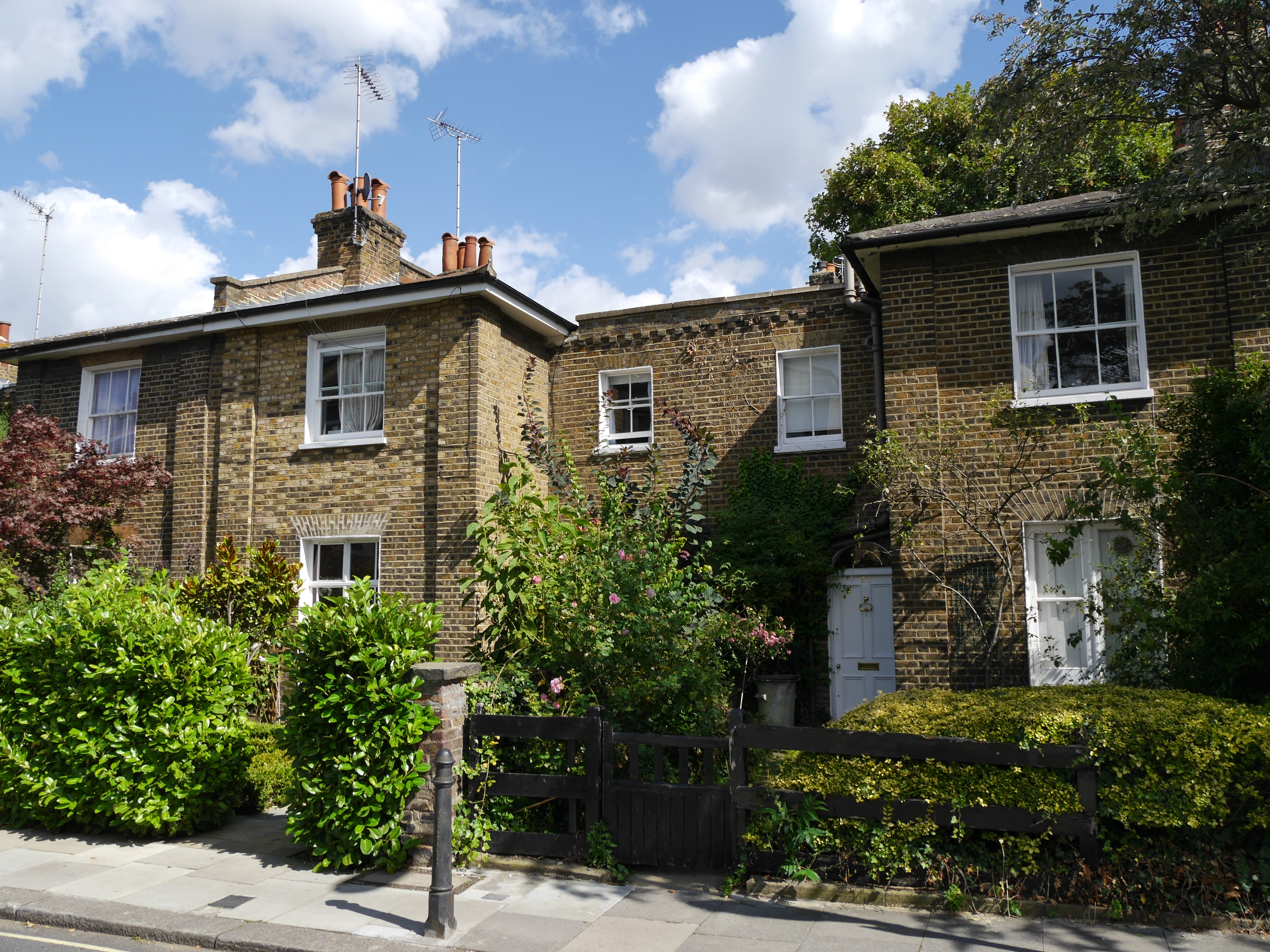
Rowan Road

Rowan Road is a road in Hammersmith, London W6.

Rowan Road runs north–south from Brook Green in the north to Hammersmith Road in the south.

Almost all of the eastern side, 8-46 Rowan Road, is Grade II listed.
