= St Joseph's Almshouses =

Coordinates: 51.494245°N 0.21677374°W

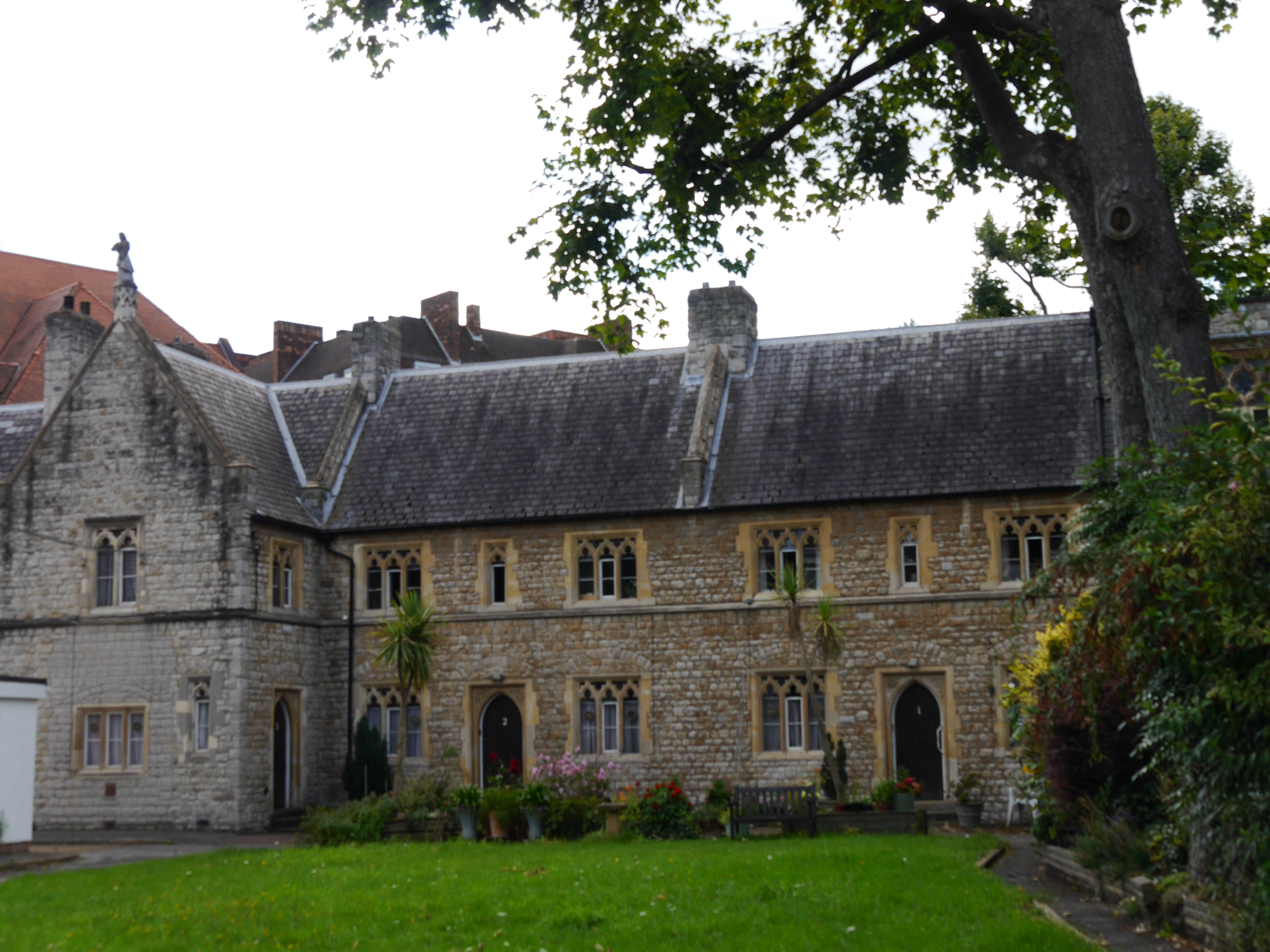
St Joseph's Almshouses

St Joseph's Almshouses is a Grade II listed building at Brook Green, London W6 7BN.

They were built in 1851, probably by the architect William Wardell. Only four remain today.
