= Ise katagami =

Japanese craft of making paper stencils

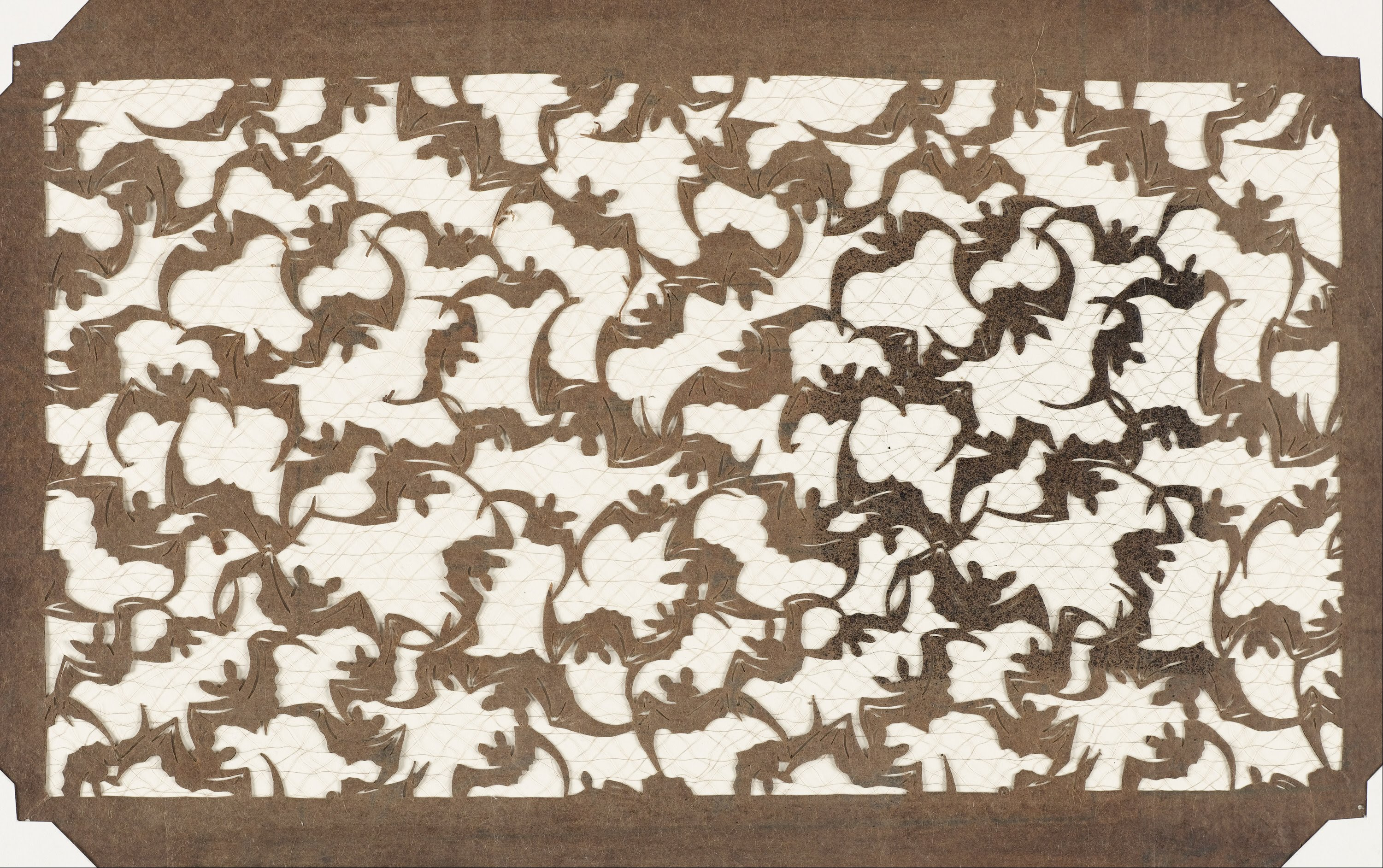
Katagami depicting flying bats (1780–1830): mulberry paper, lacquer made from persimmon juice, and human hair

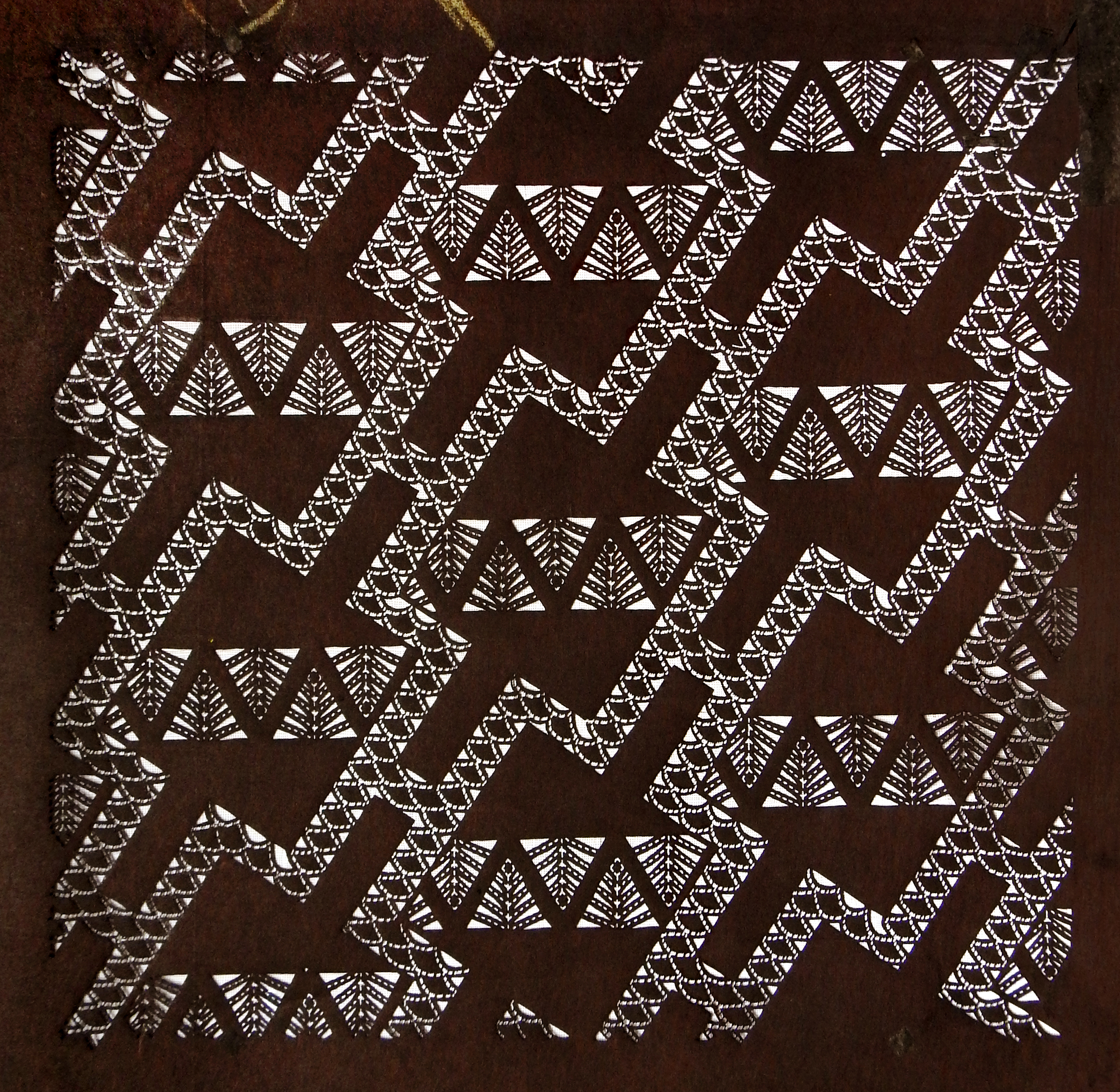
Katagami depicting geometric ornament (1900s)

Ise katagami (伊勢型紙) is the Japanese craft of making paper stencils for dyeing textiles (katagami (型紙)). It is designated one of the Important Intangible Cultural Properties of Japan. The art is traditionally centered on the city of Suzuka in Mie Prefecture. It is different from ise washi, though both are made in Mie Prefecture.

== Description ==
Multiple layers of thin washi paper are bonded with a glue extracted from persimmon, which makes a strong flexible brown coloured paper. The designs can be extremely intricate, and consequently fragile. Nowadays the stencils are sometimes sold as artwork, attached to hand fans, or used to decorate screens and doors in Japanese rooms. For kimono printing the stencils are stabilized by attaching them to a fine silk net. In past times, human hair was used instead of silk, but silk is less likely to warp and can be finer.

== Technique ==
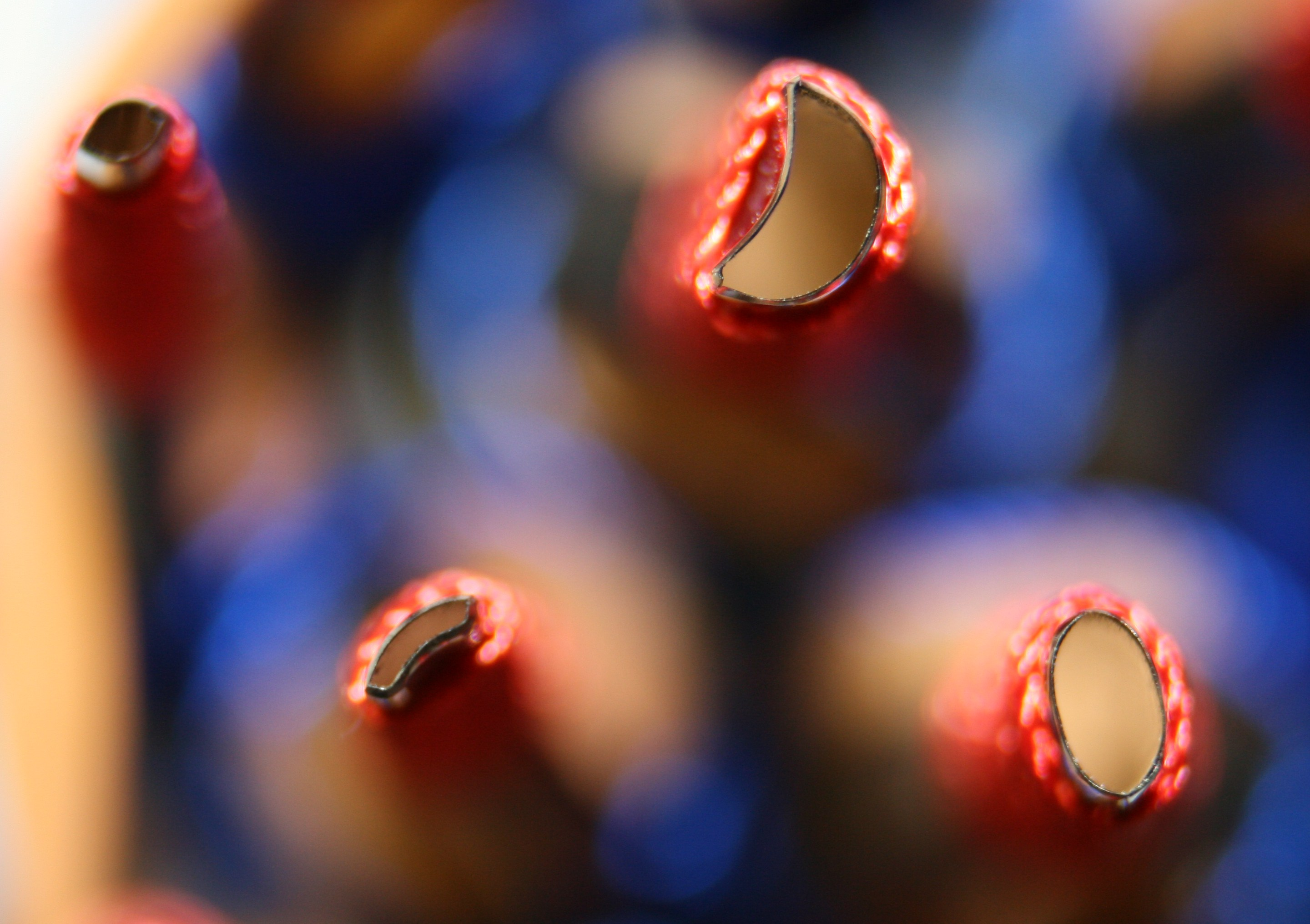
Dōgu-bori, tools used for cutting the stencils

Three sheets of washi (和紙) or Japanese paper are pasted together with kakishibu (柿渋), tannin-rich persimmon juice. The pattern is excised using a variety of tools known as dōgu-bori (道具彫り). Four principal cutting techniques are used:

1. Pulling the knife towards the artist, which results in long straight cuts.
2. Carving patterns, which allows for figurative designs.
3. Cutting circular holes, often in fan-like designs
4. Using shaped punches.

The stencils are then used for resist dyeing. Rice paste is passed through the stencil onto silk. When dyed, the color does not adhere to the areas with rice paste. By multiple alignments of the stencil, large areas can be patterned. This technique was developed in France as silk screen printing. The stencil is not generally used for more than one kimono, though multiple stencils can be cut at the same time.

== History ==
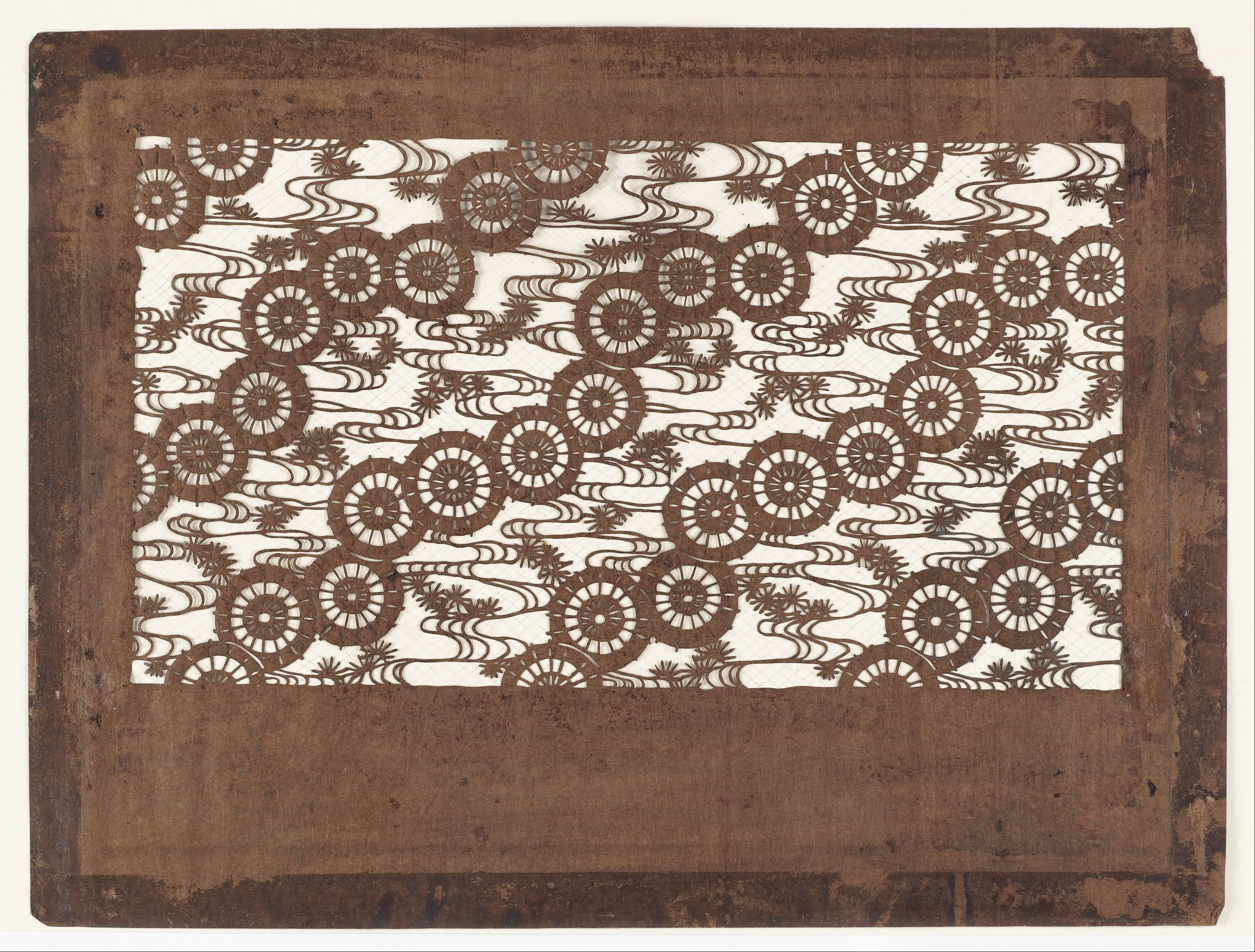
Katagami with design of umbrellas, water and pine needle clusters (late 19th century): mulberry paper, persimmon-juice lacquer, silk thread

The use of stencils was known by the Nara period, as is evident from objects in the Shōsōin (正倉院). Later paper stencils developed alongside kimono. The technique is known as ise katagami since towns in Ise Province, now Mie Prefecture, were historic centres of the craft. Production is now primarily localised around the town of Suzuka.

== Conservation ==
Former practitioners Nakajima Hidekichi (中島秀吉) (1883–1968), Rokutani Baiken (六谷梅軒) (1907–1973), Nanbu Yoshimatsu (南部芳松) (1894–1976), Nakamura Yūjirō (中村勇二郎) (1902–1985), Kodama Hiroshi (児玉博) (1909–1992), and Jōnoguchi Mie (城ノ口みゑ) (1917–2003) were recognized as Living National Treasures (人間国宝). The Association for the Preservation of Ise-Katagami (伊勢型紙技術保存会) was founded in 1992. Ise katagami was designated an Important Intangible Cultural Property (重要無形文化財) in 1993. The Ise-Katagami Stencil Museum in Suzuka opened in 1997.

== Collections ==
- The Museum of Applied Arts Vienna (MAK) has more than 8,000 examples of ise katagami in its collection, which inspired artists from the Wiener Werkstätte such as Josef Hoffmann, among others. In 2018 more than 600 examples of ise katagami with detailed data sheets were published in the online database of the MAK.
- The Museum of Domestic Design and Architecture, Middlesex University has around 400 examples of ise katagami in its collection, which are part of the Silver Studio Collection. They were among the visual resources collected by Arthur Silver as inspiration for designs for wallpapers and textiles.

== See also ==
- Katazome
- Important Intangible Cultural Properties of Japan
- National Treasures of Japan – Dyeing and Weaving
