= 18 and 19 Brook Green =

Georgian houses in Hammersmith, London, England

Coordinates: 51.495025°N 0.21685928°W

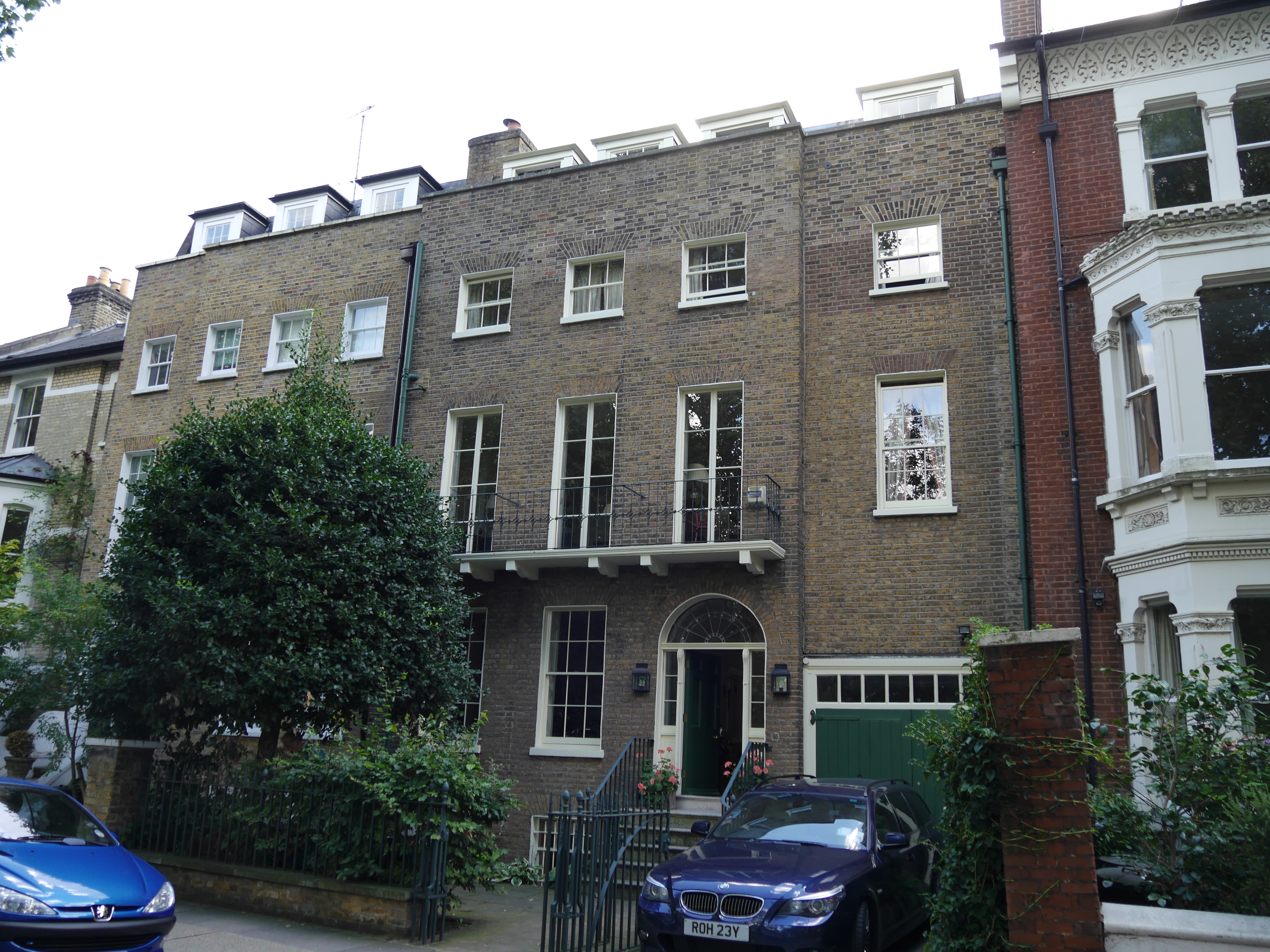
18 and 19 Brook Green, London

18 and 19 Brook Green are two Grade II listed Georgian houses at 18–19 Brook Green, Hammersmith, London, W6.

The houses were built in the early 19th century.
