= The Little Welsh Girl =

1920 film directed by Fred Paul

- Directed by: Fred Paul
- Production company: London Film Company
- Distributed by: Jury Films
- Release date: January 1920
- Country: United Kingdom
- Languages: Silent; English intertitles

The Little Welsh Girl is a 1920 British silent drama film directed by Fred Paul and starring Christine Silver, Humberston Wright and Booth Conway.

== Cast ==
- Christine Silver as Ellen Lloyd
- Humberston Wright as Cedri Lloyd
- Booth Conway as Peter the fiddler
- Adelaide Grace as Mrs. Lloyd
- Daphne Grey as Dylis Moran
- Robert Michaelis as Rhys Bowen
- Dorothy Ardley as Tessie Dunbar

== Bibliography ==
- Low, Rachael. History of the British Film, 1918-1929. George Allen & Unwin, 1971.
