= English String Quartet =

English music group

The English String Quartet was founded in 1902 by a group of students from the Royal College of Music: Thomas F. Morris (1st violin), Herbert H. Kinsey (2nd violin), Frank Bridge (viola) and Ivor James (cello). The name was not officially adopted until 1908. Morris left to join the Royal Flying Corps in 1915 and was replaced by Marjorie Hayward as leader. Bridge became an occasional player from the same year and was sometimes replaced by Alfred Hobday. Edwin Virgo took over as 2nd violin in 1918. The original group disbanded in 1925.

The Quartet put on its own concert seasons and provisional tours, but also gave recitals at private houses, including the homes of Bridge's friend Marjorie Fass in London (Bedford Square) and Eastbourne. They also played at Edgar Speyer's Classical Concerts Society and at other recital series. Their core repertoire was mostly classical - Haydn, Mozart and Beethoven - but also included the British premieres of the quartets of Debussy (in October 1904) and Ravel. In June 1909 the Quartet played the first performance of Bridge's String Quartet No 1 in London. Other British first performances included works by J D Davis and Percy Pitt.

In the 1930s The New English String Quartet was formed with Winifred Small (1st), Eveline Thompson (2nd), Winifred Stiles (viola) and Florence Hooton (cello). Kathleen Merritt also played violin with the group between 1930 and 1935. During the late 1940s a version of the English String Quartet was touring with Kathleen Washbourne (1st), Belle Davidson (2nd), Jacqueline Townshend (viola) and Kathleen Moorhouse (cello). The English String Quartet re-emerged in the late 1950s, initially with Ruth Pearl as leader and then Nona Liddell (leader 1957–1973), with (variously) Lesley White, Eleanor St George and Marilyn Taylor (2nd), Margorie Lempfert (viola) and Helen Just (cello). In 1982 Diana Cummings took over as leader with her husband Luciano Iorio (viola). At this point it became "a natural extension of the renowned Cummings String Trio", also including John Trusler (2nd violin) and Geoffrey Thomas (cello) from the Trio.
