= Museum of Domestic Design and Architecture =

Former museum in North London, England

- Location within Greater London
- Established: 2000; 26 years ago
- Location: 9 Boulevard Drive, London, NW9 5HF, United Kingdom
- Coordinates: 51°35′46″N 0°14′27″W
- Public transit access: Colindale
- Website: moda.mdx.ac.uk

The Museum of Domestic Design and Architecture (MoDA) was a museum in North London, England, housing one of the most comprehensive collections of 19th- and 20th-century decorative arts for the home.

The collections included the Silver Studio collection of designs for wallpapers and textiles, the Charles Hasler collection, and the Crown Wallpaper Archive.

In 2008 the Silver Studio Collection was Designated as being of outstanding national and international quality and significance by Arts Council England.

The museum was part of Middlesex University. Between 2000 and 2011 the museum was located at Cat Hill, Barnet, on Middlesex University's art and design campus. Exhibitions included: Purl (2004) The Suburban Landscape: 200 Years of Gardens and Gardening (2008); Japantastic: Japanese-inspired patterns for British homes, 1880-1930 (2010), and Petal Power (2011).

From 2011 to 2023 the MoDA Collections Centre was based at Beaufort Park in Colindale, close to Middlesex University's Hendon campus in the London Borough of Barnet. During this time the museum ran several innovative research projects including The Hasler Gallery (2015); Katagami in Practice (2016-18), funded by Arts Council England; and Exploration of Social Sharing (2022), with support from the Art Fund. The museum also published a podcast 'That Feels Like Home' before and during the pandemic.

The museum closed to visitors in September 2023 with a plan to end all remaining operations by July 2024.

== The Silver Studio Collection ==
The Silver Studio (run by the Silver family) was a commercial design practice, based in West London, which between 1880 and 1963 completed more than 20,000 schemes for items such as furnishing fabrics, wallpapers, tablecloths, rugs and carpets. The Studio employed a number of designers, some of whom, such as Archibald Knox, were well known in their own right. There were many others whose work remained anonymous.

The Silver Studio's customers were retailers and manufacturers of wallpapers and textiles at all levels of the market, both in Britain and abroad. Designs for wallpapers were sold both to manufacturers producing cheap papers for the mass market, such as Lightbown Aspinall and Potters of Darwen, as well as those selling high quality products for the top end of the market, such as Essex & Co, John Line, and Sandersons. Silver Studio designs were bought by all the leading British textile manufacturers, including Stead McAlpin, Alexander Morton, and AH Lee, to name just a few. Clients included well known producers of high quality fabrics, such as Turnbull & Stockdale and the famous department store, Liberty.

Because the majority of the Silver Studio's clients were mass producers, Silver Studio designs found their way into numerous British homes. The Studio's influence on British interiors over a remarkable length of time can be seen in the huge number of their designs that went into production.

After it closed in the early 1960s, the contents of the Silver Studio were given to the Hornsey College of Art, which subsequently became part of what is now Middlesex University.

Silver Studio designs found their way into many British homes over a long period, because most of its clients were mass producers. The significance of the Silver Studio as a design practice was acknowledged in 1981 with the awarding of an English Heritage blue plaque to 84 Brook Green, Hammersmith, the building that was both the Studio and the Silver family home.

While it was part of the Museum of Domestic Design and Architecture, Middlesex University, the Silver Studio Collection was both a resource for historians interested in the history of domestic interiors, and a visual resource for students and creative practitioners.

== Charles Hasler Collection ==
This material was the working collection of designer and typographer, Charles Hasler (1908-1992). Hasler played a significant role in many high-profile exhibitions, displays, poster campaigns and book publishing in Britain from the mid-1930s to the mid-1980s.

Between 1942 and 1951, Hasler was an exhibition designer for the Ministry of Information and the Central Office of Information. He worked on displays such as ‘Dig For Victory’, ‘Make Do and Mend’ and ‘Nation and the Child’. After the war, he became a senior designer and chairman of the Typographic Panel for the Festival of Britain of 1951.

Hasler designed and produced the influential Specimen of Display Letters for use by Festival architects and designers. Throughout his career, Hasler lectured in typographic design and history and was involved with the education and professional development of print and graphic designers

Hasler was interested in the newly emerging field of packaging and branding and in the role of typographical design. His collection reflects his keen interest in all kinds of printed material and includes postcards, playbills, sheet music, packaging and posters dating from the nineteenth century onwards.

In May 2024 ownership of the Charles Hasler Collection was transferred to the University of Reading Special Collections. The Charles Hasler Collection will make a great contribution to Reading’s existing holdings, that include the Archive of British Publishing and Printing.

== Sir James Richards Library ==
MoDA previously held the Sir James Maude Richards Library on long-term loan. This was a collection of architectural books and journals collected by Sir JM Richards (1907-1992), a leading spokesman and theorist of the Modern Movement in architecture in Britain.

The collection was returned to its owner in February 2024.

== Crown Wallpaper Archive ==
MoDA's Crown Wallpaper Collection consisted of around 5,000 wallpaper albums and samples dating from the early 1950s to the late 1960s, donated to the museum by Crown Wallpapers in 1989.

Along with the wallpapers of MoDA's Silver Studio Collection, this collection represents one of the country's finest bodies of non-elite wallpapers of the late nineteenth to the mid twentieth centuries. The majority of the wallpapers held here were intended for the mass market, not for ‘high-end’ consumers, and could therefore be seen as a barometer of British taste over a long period.

The majority of items from the Crown Wallpaper collection were divided between the Whitworth Art Gallery and Sanderson Design Group when the museum closed.

== The Domestic Design Collection 1870–1960 ==
This collection consisted of over 4,000 books, journals, magazines and trade and retail catalogues relating to all aspects of home furnishing, household management, cookery, house building, DIY, home crafts and gardening.

A particularly important element was the material relating to the growth of North London suburbia between around 1900 and 1939. It consisted of posters, brochures and other publicity material produced by property developers, builders and estate agents. This material complemented the other items relating to domestic decoration and furnishing from the same period.

== Dispersal of the Collections ==
The closure of the museum in 2024 meant that items from the Crown Wallpaper collection and Domestic Design Collection were split and distributed among various institutions:

- The suburbia-related material mainly went to Enfield Local Studies Archive and Ealing Local Studies Archive.
- The University of Brighton Design Archives received material relating to the Festival of Britain, the Council of Industrial Design, and also designs and textiles by Enid Marx and designs by Laurence Scarfe.
- Manchester Metropolitan University Special Collections Museum and Buckinghamshire New University each accepted a proportion of the collection of trade and retail catalogues
- the Knitting Reference Library at Winchester School of Art accepted a number of knitting patterns and related magazines.
- Gunnersbury Park and Museum received tiles and ephemera designed by ceramic tile designer and artist, Eleanor Greeves
- A collection of paint charts and ephemera relating to Ripolin went to Tate Archive
- A collection of cookery books was transferred to the Food Museum
- Sanderson Design Group and The Whitworth Art Gallery each accepted a proportion of the collection of wallpapers and textiles
- Lancaster City Museums and Kirkcaldy Galleries each received linoleum-related material
- Braintree District Museum received Bardfield wallpapers by Bawden and Aldridge
- Oral histories and images of home interiors donated by members of the public were transferred to the Mass Observation Archive at The Keep, along with the Location Finder collection of images of homes and domestic buildings compiled by a TV and film location scout between 1980-2000
