= Robert Michaelis =

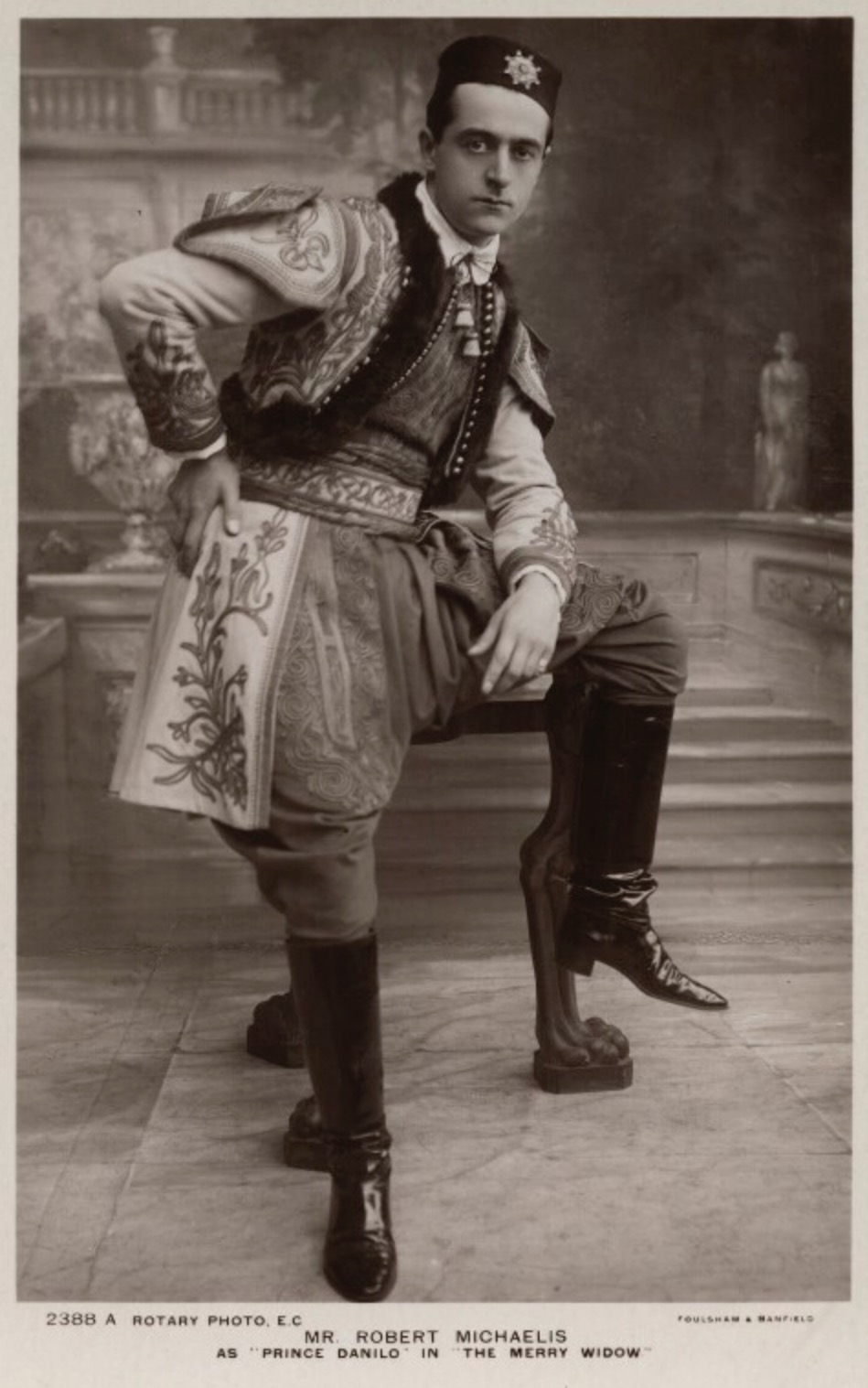
Robert Michaelis in The Merry Widow, 1908

Robert Armand René Michaelis (22 December 1878 – 29 August 1965) was a French-born actor and singer who worked in musical theatre, mainly in England, but he also made appearances on Broadway.

By 1901, Michaelis and his parents had settled in Hampstead, and he was married there in 1913. He was naturalized as a British subject in 1914.

After retiring from the stage, he became a manager, and during the Second World War was an air raid warden, by then having made his home in the west of England.

== Career ==
Born in 1878, according to different sources in Saint Petersburg or Paris, Michaelis was the son of Guilllaume Paul Hermann Michaelis and Marie Leonie Heloise Michaelis. His mother was French, and his father was born a German but naturalized as French. He was educated in London and Paris and trained as a singer in Vienna with Felice Bottelli.

At the time of the 1901 census, Michaelis was living in Latchmere, Battersea, with his parents, Herman Michaelis, a schoolmaster, aged fifty, and Marie, aged 45, and his occupation was stated as actor.

An early appearance in musical theatre came in 1907, when Michaelis sang in Gustave Kerker's The White Hen at the Casino Theatre, New York, in a run lasting three months. In 1908, he took over the part of Prince Danilo in The Merry Widow for the last four months of its run at Daly's Theatre, then was cast as Freddy Fairfax in The Dollar Princess (1909), becoming a favourite at Daly's, and playing a leading role in The Marriage Market (1911). In 1912, he sang the title role in an English production of Franz Lehár's operetta The Count of Luxembourg, as one of the five principals, together with Phyllis Le Grand, Eric Thorne, Lauri de Frece, and Daisy Burrell, who were collectively described by the Musical News as "all consummate artists in their own style".

Soon after the beginning of the First World War, Michaelis, then living at 8 Eton Villas, South Hampstead, was naturalized as a British subject, declaring the names of his parents and his place of birth as Paris.

In 1920, Michaelis appeared in the silent film The Little Welsh Girl, then for more than a year, from 1920 to 1921, he sang the part of Beaudon in a London production of Irene at the Empire Theatre which had a run of 399 performances.

When he was granted probate on his mother's estate in 1933, Michaelis was described as a "manager".

In October 1939, Michaelis was living at Wychwood, Tickenham, Somerset, and soon after the outbreak of the Second World War was registered as an air raid warden and retired actor.

In his Nights of Gladness (1956), English theatre historian Walter MacQueen-Pope, known as "Popie", called Michaelis "one of the very best performers Daly's ever had".

== Personal life ==
Michaelis's father, Herman Michaelis, died at St Pancras in 1912. In 1913, at Hampstead, Michaelis married Phyllis Le Grand, the actress with whom he had starred in The Count of Luxembourg the year before. Their daughter Rosemary Evelyn Helene was born in March 1914. She later became a nurse and radiographer. Michaelis's mother, Marie, died in 1933, aged 78. Her address was 8, Eton Villas, South Hampstead, and she left an estate valued at £2,293. In 1940, Rosemary Michaelis married John A. Parsons in Somerset. Three grandchildren were born between 1943 and 1949. Michaelis died on 29 August 1965 at the Bristol Royal Infirmary, when his address was given as "Summerlands Nailsea", and he left an estate valued for probate at £7,051. His widow, Phyllis, survived him until 15 May 1981.

== Film roles ==
- The Little Welsh Girl (1920), as Rhys Bowen

== Musicals ==
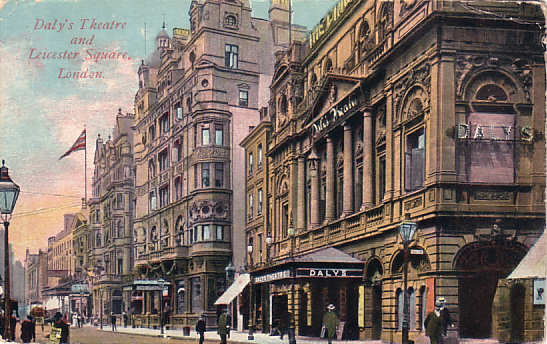
Daly's Theatre, Leicester Square

- The White Hen (Casino Theatre, New York, 1907)
- The Merry Widow (Daly's Theatre, 1908), as Prince Danilo
- The Dollar Princess (Daly's Theatre, 1909), as Freddy Fairfax
- The Marriage Market (Daly's Theatre, 1911)
- The Count of Luxembourg (Daly's Theatre, 1912 production), as Count René of Luxembourg
- Gipsy Love (Daly's Theatre, 1912), as Jozsi
- Irene (1920 London production at Empire Theatre) as J. P. Beaudon
- Orange Blossoms (Fulton Theatre, New York, 1922) as Baron Roger Belmont
