= 84 Brook Green =

Coordinates: 51.496690°N 0.22053123°W

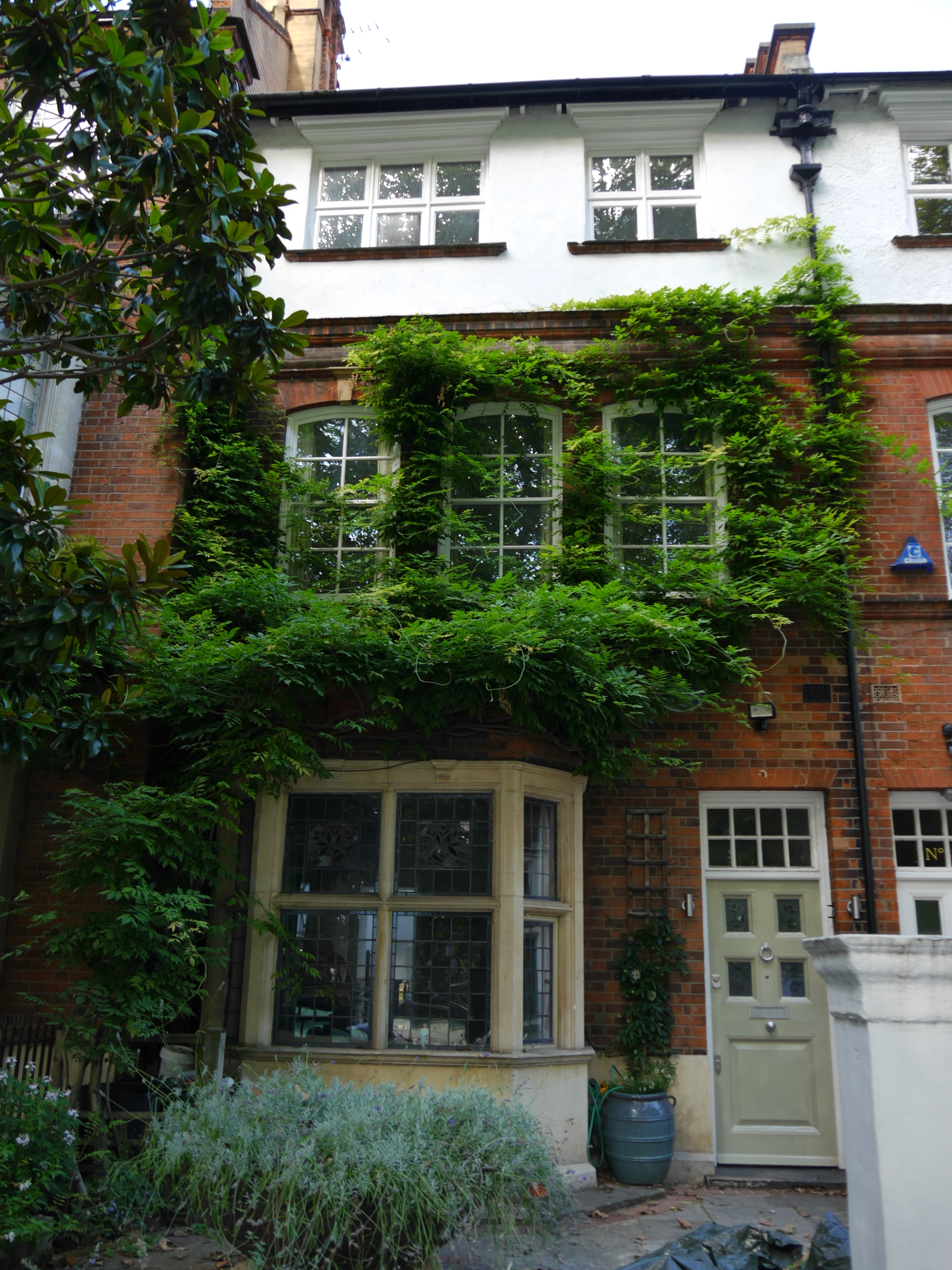
84 Brook Green, London

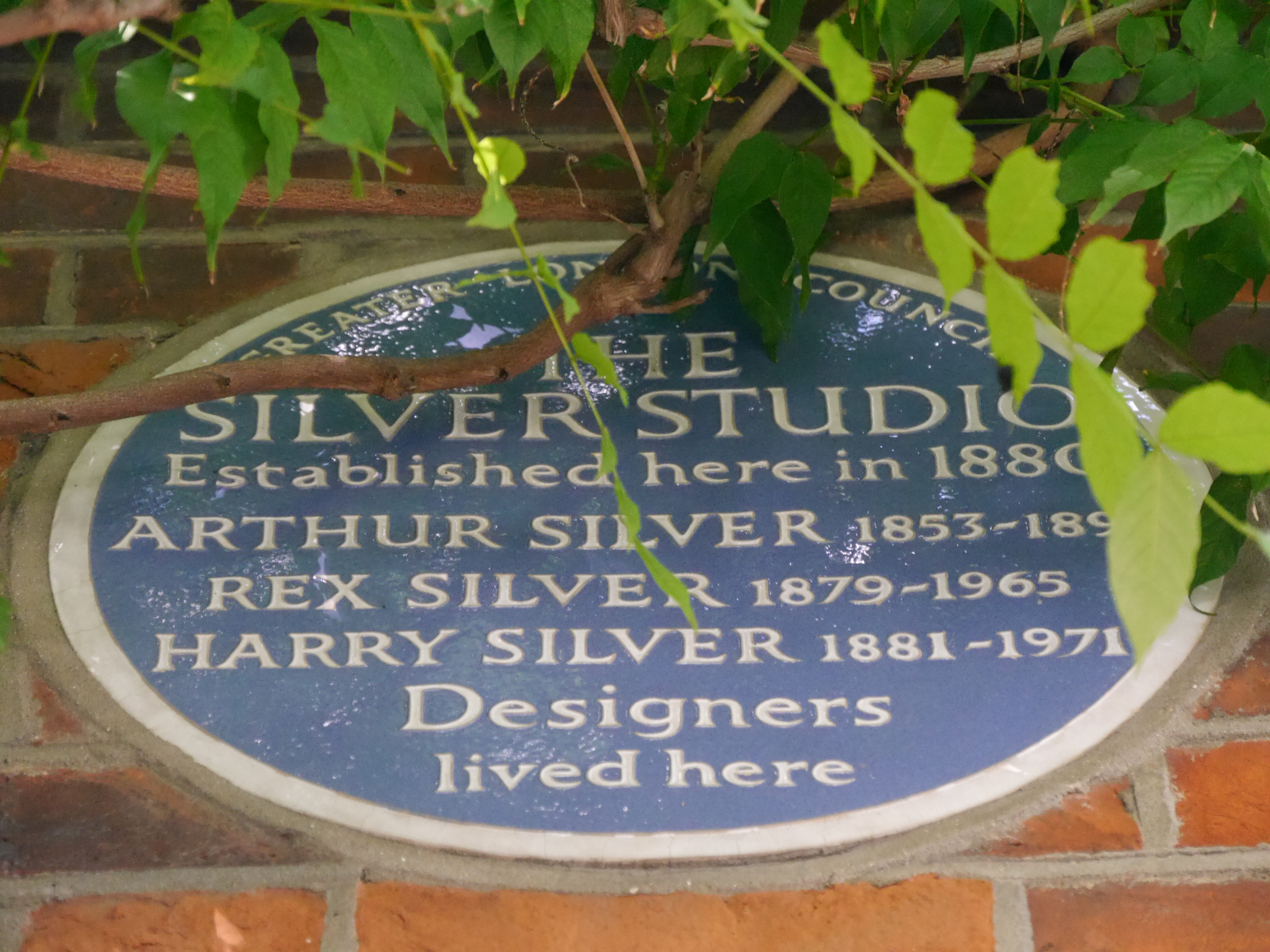
Blue plaque, 84 Brook Green

84 Brook Green is a building at 84 Brook Green, Hammersmith, London, W6 7BD.

The house dates from the mid-19th century. It was both the workplace of the Silver Studio and the Silver family.
