= Queen's Head, Brook Green =

Pub in Hammersmith, London

Coordinates: 51.496169°N 0.22098720°W

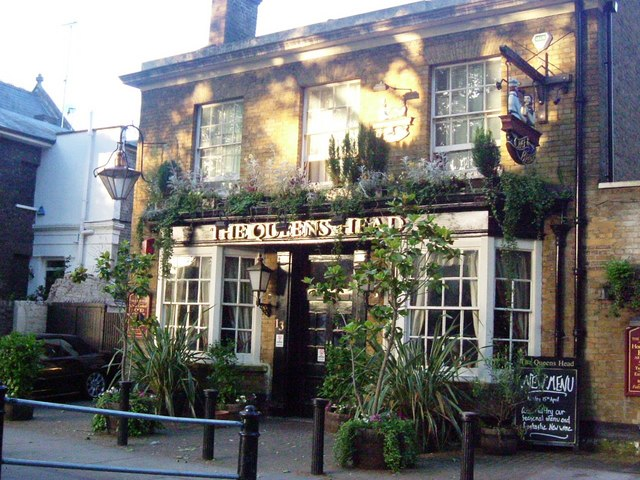
The Queen's Head

The Queen's Head is a pub at 13 Brook Green, Hammersmith, London W6.

It was built in 1796, originally as two houses (13 and 14), built for two brothers as their out of town villas. A later resident at no 14 was the Marquis of Queensbury. The houses became the Queen's Head pub in the early 1900s.

The highwayman Dick Turpin was a regular visitor.
