= Silver Studio =

Studio of textile design from the UK

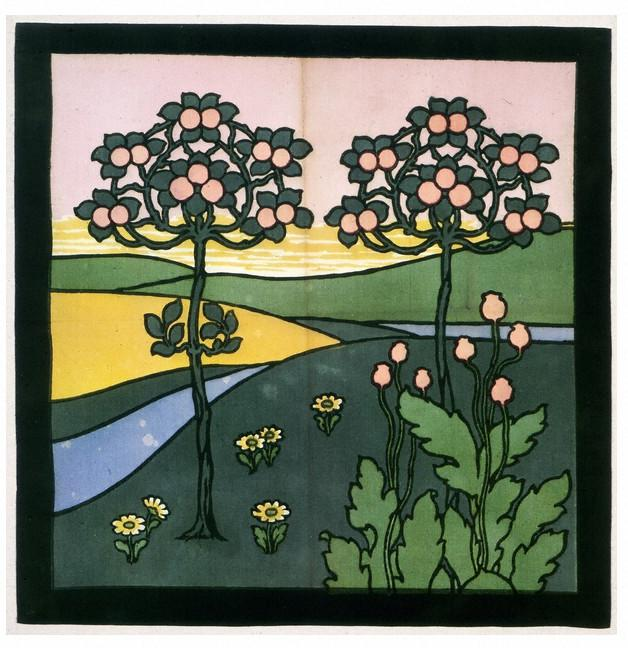
Cushion cover panel, 1904, Silver Studio V&A Museum no. CIRC.675-1966

The Silver Studio was one of the most influential textile design studios in the UK from its formation in 1880 until the middle of the twentieth century.

The studio, founded by Arthur Silver (1853–1896) designed some of the most famous fabric, wallpaper, carpet and metalwork designs for companies such as Liberty's, Turnbull and Stockdale, Sanderson and Warner and Sons Ltd, all of which used the Silver Studio's designs for their own ranges of wallpapers and textiles.

At its most productive, the studio created more than 800 designs per year. The studio was renowned for its distinctive Art Nouveau style, although over the years they produced a wide variety of different designs and styles, including many of the famous Liberty style.

The significance of the Silver Studio as a design practice was acknowledged in 1981 with the awarding of an English Heritage blue plaque to 84 Brook Green, Hammersmith, the building that was both the Studio and the Silver family home.

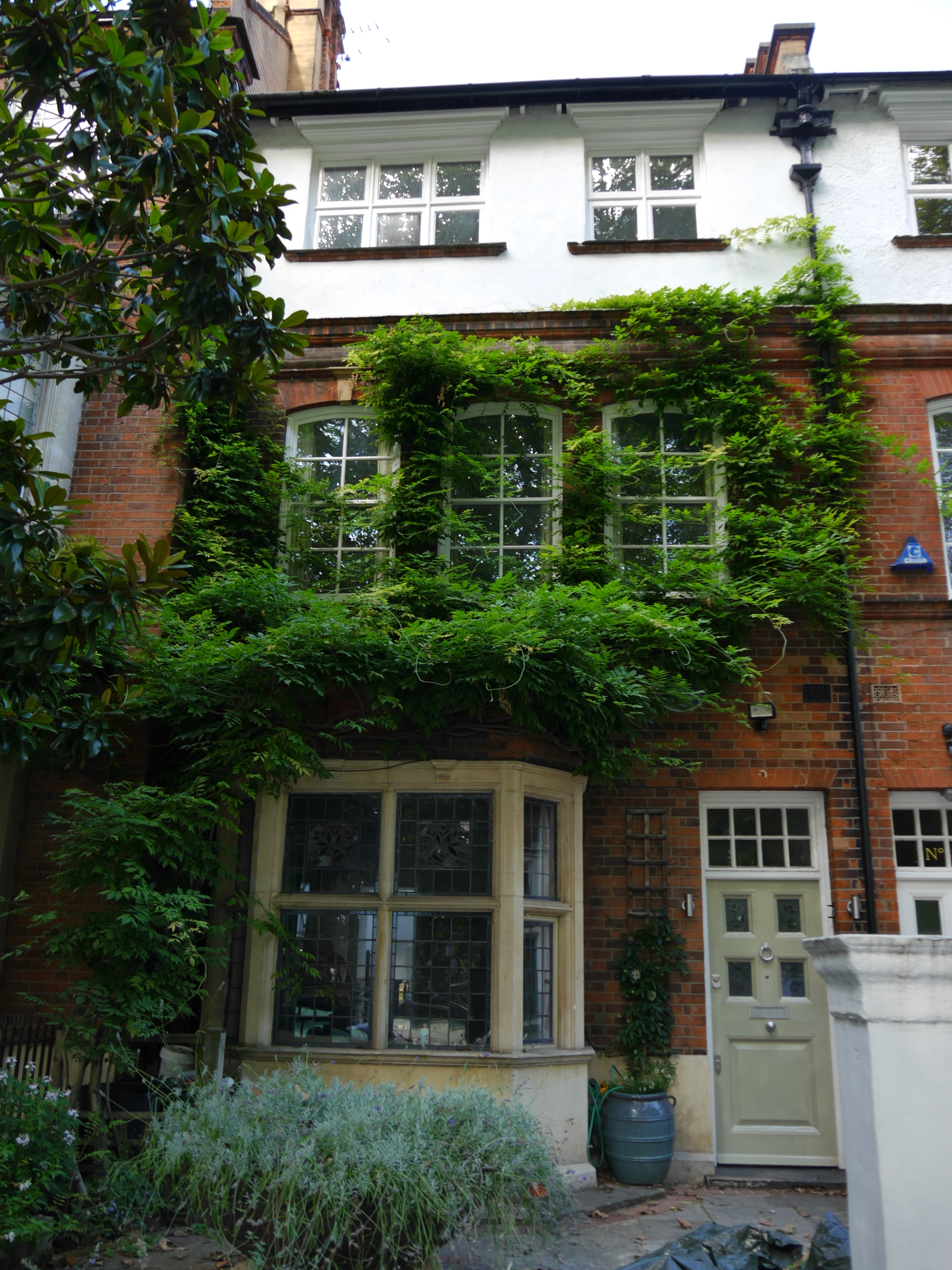
84 Brook Green, London

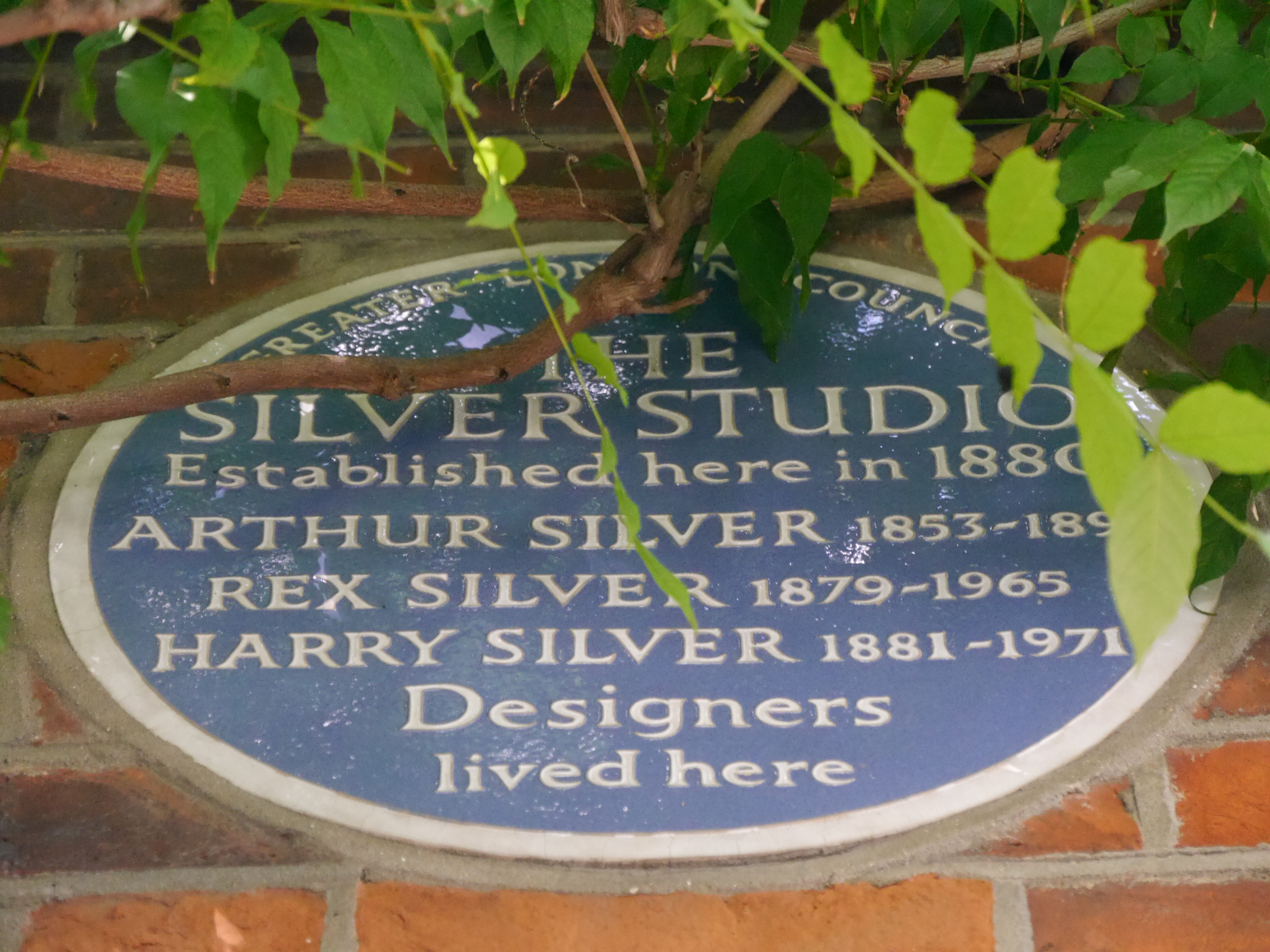
Blue plaque, 84 Brook Green

== History ==
The Silver Studio was founded by Arthur Silver in 1880. In 1901 Silver's son Reginald (Rex) Silver took over the studio and ran it until 1962. As Designer-Manager, Rex's role was to understand the requirements of the Studio's clients.

For its final year of operation, 1963, Rex's studio was run by Frank Price textile designer, a designer of importance. He had worked twice at the Silver Studio, firstly, for a period before the Second World War 1922 to 1935, leaving to a partnership with G.R. Kingbourne. Later he became chief designer at Arthur Sanderson & Sons. This job ended during the War, when Sandersons were bombed out, at which point he rejoined the Silver Studio, in 1941.

From 1953 to 1963, Frank Price was the only working designer, though Rex continued to manage the business until it closed in 1963.

Subsequently, Mary Peerless (Rex Silver's step-daughter) inherited the contents of the Studio from Rex, and gifted the majority of items to Hornsey College of Art.

== Clients ==
The Silver Studio sold designs for fabrics and wallpapers to a number of manufacturers. Designs for wallpapers were sold both to manufacturers producing cheap papers for the mass market such as Lightbown Aspinall and Potters of Darwen, as well as those selling high quality products for the top end of the market such as Essex & Co, John Line and Arthur Sanderson & Sons. Leading British textile manufacturers included Stead McAlpin, Alexander Morton and AH Lee[Arthur H Lee, Birkenhead], Turnbull & Stockdale and Liberty, to name just a few.

== Employees ==
Throughout its long history, the Silver Studio employed a varying number of designers, few of whom are well known in their own right. Some were paid as salaried employees, while some were freelancers. The number employed was usually around 10-12. Male designers worked in the Studio itself, while female designers were required to work from home.

Designers known to have worked for the Silver Studio include:

- Archibald Knox (1864-1933)
- John Illingworth Kay (1870-1950)
- Harry Napper
- Frank Price
- Lewis Jones
- Madeleine Lawrence
- Winifred Mold

== The Silver Studio's influence ==
The importance of the Silver Studio's influence internationally is indicated by the fact that in the early 1900s, around two thirds of the Studio's designs were sold to French and Belgian textile manufacturers, including Bergert Dupont et Cie, Dumas, Florquin, Gros Roman, Zuber Cie, Vanoutryve, Parison and Leborgne.

The Silver Studio is widely recognised as having played an important part in the development of British Art Nouveau. John Illingworth Kay and Harry Napper, two of its better-known designers, executed many of its most successful Art Nouveau designs. The Studio produced several thousand designs for wallpapers, textiles and metalwork in the Art Nouveau style between around 1895 and the early 1900s.

During the 1890s, Arthur Silver was also heavily interested in and influenced by the art of Japan. He worked closely with Alexander Rottman who imported many different varieties of paper from Japan. With Rottman, the Silver Studio developed a pioneering technique of stencil decoration, influenced by Japanese stencils, which in turn came to influence the Studio's own Art Nouveau designs. Anglo-Japanese collaboration of this kind in the 1890s meant that Japanese influences were absorbed into British design and decoration, and equally that British tastes influenced the products of Japan itself.

Because the majority of the Silver Studio's clients were mass producers, Silver Studio designs would have found their way into many British homes. The Studio's influence on British interiors can be seen in the huge number of their designs that went into production. The Studio's most productive periods were 1891-96 and 1924-38. In those years, the minimum number of Silver Studio designs for wallpapers and textiles that were actually manufactured each year was approximately 400.

== The Silver Studio Collection ==
=== Background to the collection ===
After the Silver Studio closed in the early 1960s the contents were given to the Hornsey College of Art by Mary Peerless, step daughter of Rex Silver the head of the Silver Studio. Hornsey became part of what is now Middlesex University. From this point, the contents of the Studio became a ‘Collection’, and it now forms the core of the Museum of Domestic Design & Architecture, (MoDA), Middlesex University.

The Silver Studio Collection was awarded Designated status in 2008, in recognition of its national and international quality and significance. Along with the other collections at the Museum of Domestic Design and Architecture, the Silver Studio Collection is well used as a resource for students, researchers and the wider public.

=== Contents of the collection ===
The collection today comprises over 40,000 designs on paper - mostly for textiles and wallpapers. There are approximately 5,000 wallpaper samples, 23 wallpaper pattern books and 5,000 textile samples. The collection also includes an archive of the Studio's daybooks, letters, diaries, visual reference material, trade cards and other printed ephemera.

The significance of the collection lies both in its completeness and coherence as a whole and in the importance and uniqueness of its component parts. It spans the period 1880-1960, an important period in the development of mass market furnishings and one less well represented in other collections. Where other similar material does survive it is invariably less broad in scope (either in time span, or because the work of one designer or manufacturer only); less rich in supporting material (because daybooks and other evidence does not survive); and less accessible to researchers and members of the public.

== Designs ==
The designs are original works on paper created by Silver Studio designers, in a variety of media including pencil, ink, charcoal, pastels and gouaches. It is one of the largest collections of original designs anywhere in the country, representing a significant period of time and a wide range of customers.

== Wallpapers and textiles ==
The wallpapers and textiles in the collection consist of both the Silver Studio's own work (i.e. the finished product, often sent from the manufacturers), and examples of wallpapers and textiles designed by others, which were collected for reference. This collection includes examples of wallpapers and textiles by all of the “big name” designers of the late nineteenth and early twentieth centuries, including William Morris, C.F.A. Voysey, Harry Napper, Archibald Knox, Frank Price and John Illingworth Kay.

It is generally considered that during the life of Silver Studio its two most outstanding designers were Archibald Knox and Frank Price. The Silver Studio Collection contains work by designers who worked for the Silver Studio, and also examples of work by others which the Studio employees collected as reference material.

== Archive ==
The archive material consists of business records, wage books, photograph albums, correspondence, letters, diaries, visual reference material, trade cards, and other printed ephemera. The Silver Studio was pioneering in that it employed the services of a photographer to record every design. Designs were numbered and cross referenced to photograph albums and day books, the majority of which survive. It is therefore possible to trace the details of the designer of a given design (by which is meant both original designs in the collections, and actual examples of wallpapers or textiles existing in the wider world) and to establish to which manufacturer it was sold, when and for how much. The completeness and coherence of this archive material existing alongside the designs, wallpapers and textiles themselves, makes the Silver Studio collection entirely unique. Rarely do other collections document the whole process of creating and selling a design, as is possible here.

== Visual reference ==
That designers employed by the Silver Studio were able to satisfy the requirements of their clients, the manufacturers, was due in part to the fact that they amassed large amounts of material as visual reference. As well as examples of wallpapers and textiles by other designers, this material includes press cuttings, reference books and other printed ephemera. It also includes material such as Japanese Ise-katagami stencils and Continental design resources collected from a variety of sources.

The Silver Studio designers used this to enable them to produce designs which gestured towards key trends while retaining mass market appeal.
