= William Henry Walenn =

British engineer and mathematician (1828 - 1896)

William Henry Walenn (7 January 1828 – 20 September 1896) was born in London and was trained as an engineer at the works of Messrs. Cottam, and received part of his education at University College, London, where he studied mathematics under Augustus De Morgan. He became a Fellow of the Chemical Society in 1866, and of the Institute of Chemistry soon after its establishment. He was also a member of the Physical Society of London.

== Biography ==
Walenn was one of the earliest abridgers of specifications to the Patent Office, beginning under the then Comptroller, Mr. Woodcroft, for whom he compiled the Series of Abridgments relating to "Electricity and Magnetism," "Photography," and other subjects. In 1866, his book, Little Experiments for Little Chemists, was published, and in it was given a new process for depositing brass upon zinc. In 1871, he contributed a paper to the Philosophical Magazine, "On Solutions for Depositing Copper and Brass by means of Electric Force", and about the same time he conducted some experiments for the Government in electro-deposition of copper upon the bottom of an iron ship.

Between 1868 and 1880, several mathematical papers of Walenn's, on "Unitates" and methods of checking calculations by means of these, were published in the Phil. Mag. He died at his residence, 9 Carleton Road, Tufnell Park, on 20 September 1896, after a long illness.

== Musical family ==
Walenn's wife, Skene Charlotte (née Barth, 1837–1927) was musically trained but did not perform professionally, though her sister was the operatic soprano Alice Barth. Nevertheless, her interest led to many of her 15 children choosing music as a profession. Of them, Arthur, Herbert, Gerald and Dorothea formed the Walenn String Quartet in the 1890s. The annual Walenn Chamber Concerts series began in 1896.

- Isabella Walenn (1857–1936) married the furniture designer Arthur Silver in 1878, and spent many years with the Royal Choral Society. Their daughter was the actress and playwright Christine Silver.
- Ellie Walenn (1858–1929) was a musician and for 15 year head teacher at Roedean School.
- James Walenn (1860–1884) was a composer, from 1879 organist at St Alban's Holborn, and conductor of the St Alban's Choral Society.
- Arthur Walenn (mid-1860s-1937) was initially a viola player but later became a baritone who made his professional debut at the Queen's Hall in November 1895.
- Charles Walenn (1867–1948) was a singer and actor best known for his performances in the comic baritone roles of the Gilbert and Sullivan operas.
- Frederick Dudley Walenn (1869–1933) was primarily an artist and principal of the St John's Wood School of Art. But he was also an accomplished amateur musician and the composer of several string quartets and part songs.
- Herbert Walenn (1870–1953) was a cellist (Kruse Quartet and Walenn Quartet), founder of the London Violincello School in 1919, and a professor and examiner at the Royal Academy of Music for 50 years. His pupils included Sir John Barbirolli.
- Gerald Walenn (1871–1942) was a violinist, leader of the Walenn Quartet and a composer. He emigrated to Australia in 1917, where he toured with Nellie Melba and taught in Adelaide and Sydney.
- Dorothea Walenn (1875–1948) taught violin at St Paul's Girls' School (where she worked with Gustav Holst), performed in the Walenn Quartet, The Harmonic Trio (in the 1920s, with Edith Vance, cello and Olive Byrne, piano) and as a soloist, later devoting herself to teaching.

== See also ==
- History of electromagnetic theory
- List of musical families (classical music)
- Tim Walenn
