= Virginia Gabriel =

English singer and composer

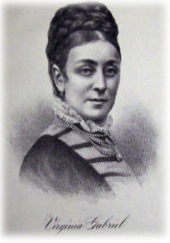
Virginia Gabriel

Mary Anne Virginia Gabriel (7 February 1825 – 7 August 1877) was an English singer and composer. She was also known as Mrs. George E. March.

== Life ==
Virginia Gabriel was born in Banstead, Surrey, England, the daughter of Major-general "Archangel" Gabriel. She studied piano with Johann Peter Pixis, Theodor Dohler, Sigismond Thalberg and Bernhard Molique and composition with opera composer Saverio Mercadante.

In 1870 Gabriel went for an extended stay at Glamis Castle in the Scottish Lowlands, and was reportedly responsible, among others, for later accounts of the castle's "secret" having to do with a mysterious occupant, the Monster of Glamis.

Gabriel wrote popular ballads which established her reputation as a songwriter and composer. Although women songwriters were well accepted in the 19th century, and she had no problems in getting her songs published, she struggled to get publishers for her more serious compositions. For example, she had to pay for self-publication of her cantata Dreamland. Although her songwriting style was Romantic, her songs always reflected ability and inventiveness because of her strength as a serious composer.

Gabriel married her librettist George March in 1874, who was employed by the Foreign Office. The Times reported that she died in 1877 from "injuries sustained by a fall from a carriage". Her Evening Post obituary described her as being "much liked in Society" and as possessing "...a kindness of heart."

== Works ==
Gabriel was known for cantatas and operas and she also wrote songs. Selected works include:

- Evangeline (1873) cantata
- Graziella (1870) cantata
- Dreamland (1870) cantata
- Widows Bewitched (1865) opera
- A Quiet Chateau (1867) opera
- Who's The Heir? (1868) opera
- Lost and Found (1870) opera
- Grass Widows, opera
- The Shepherd of Cornouaille's, opera
- The Follies of a Night, opera
- A Rainy Day, opera
- The Lion's Mouth, opera bouffe
- Change upon change (Text: Elizabeth Barrett Browning)
- Du bist wie eine Blume, op. 1, no. 3 (Text: Heinrich Heine)
- Oh, wilt thou have my hand, Dear (Text: Elizabeth Barrett Browning)
- Orpheus With His Lute (Text: John Fletcher)
- At the Window (Text: Robert Browning) song
- A Mother's Song, song
- Don't Forget Me Quite (Text: Mrs Francis Anne Kemble) song
- Ruby, song
- Beryl (Companion Song to Ruby)
- Brighter Hours, song
- Asleep, song
- Pearl, song
- Emerald, song
- The Opal Ring, song
- When Sparrows Build (Text: Jean Ingelow) song
- List'ning Mother, song
- The Door Ajar, song
- A Song to Lay at the Feet of my Love
- Little Golden Hair, song
- Corra Linn, song
- O Spare my Boy at Sea, song
- Slumber, Mine Own, song
- At my Feet, song
- Light through Darkness (from the cantata: Dreamland) song
- Dreams of Those who loved me (from the cantata: Dreamland) song
- Chloe sat beside the River (from the opera: Widows Bewitched) song
- Love is gone a Maying (from the opera: Widows Bewitched) song
- Sweet Seventeen, song
- The Golden Wedding Day, song
- Under the Trellised Vine (from the cantata: Graziella) song
- Farewell my Bark (from the cantata: Graziella) song
- You came to me with winning smile, song
- The Fisherman's Widow, contralto song
- I will arise, sacred song
- What will you do? sacred song
- The Lord is my portion church anthem
- Lily Graeme, song
- A Dead Past, song
- The Choice, song
- Thoughts! song
- Spirit Love, song
- Twilight, song
- Three Lilies, song
- Friends, song
