= Gerald Walenn =

British violinist and composer (1871 - 1942)

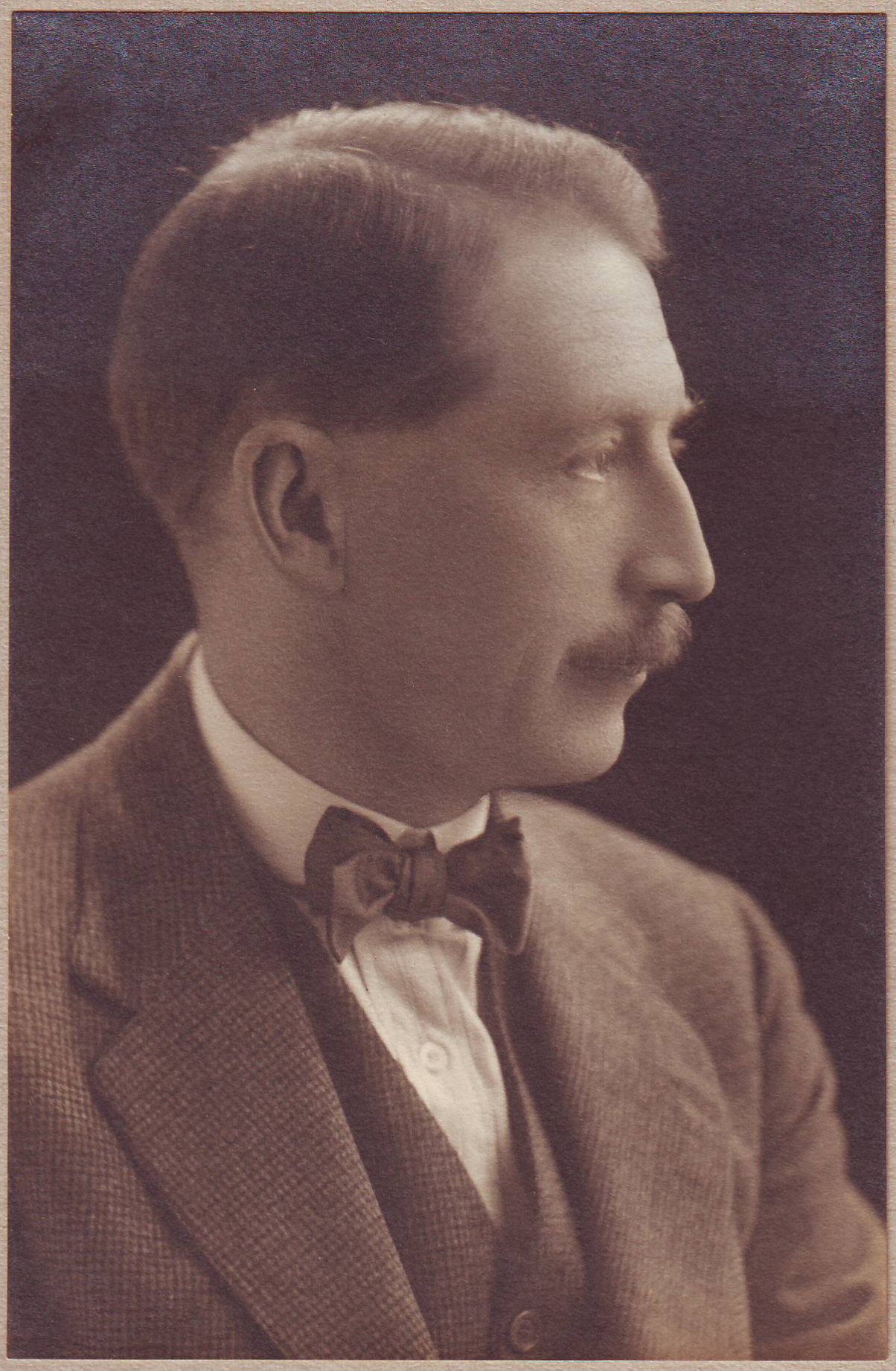
Gerald Walenn, c. 1924

Gerald Harman Walenn (19 November 1871 – 27 January 1942) was a British violinist and composer of classical music, who had a distinguished career in Australia.

Walenn was born in London, England. His father, William Henry Walenn, was a scientist who worked for many years at the Patent Office in London. His mother, Skene Charlotte (née Barth) was musically trained but did not perform professionally. Nevertheless, her interest in music led to music professions of several of her children: Herbert Walenn was a cellist and professor at the Royal Academy of Music, Charles Walenn performed with the D'Oyly Carte Opera Company and J. C. Williamson, another brother was an organist, and Gerald and a sister were violinists. Two other children found their way into art professions.

Walenn began playing the violin at the age of 8 under Kate Chaplin and later studied under John Rutson. He continued his violin studies at the Royal Academy of Music under Prosper Sainton and after his death under Emile Sauret.

He made his concert debut at the age of 14 with the Ballade for violin and orchestra, Op.16a by Moritz Moszkowski in the St James's Hall. He later performed the Mendelssohn Violin Concerto at Osborne House in the presence of Queen Victoria. Walenn also made extensive concert tours throughout Great Britain, the United States and Canada.

In 1903 he formed the Walenn String Quartet with Herbert Kinze (violin), James Lockyer (viola), and his brother Herbert (cello). In later years the violist position was changed to Lionel Tertis. The quartet was disbanded in 1914 due to the beginning of World War I. The quartet gave many premieres, including the Suite for String Quartet in C major by Alexander Glazunov which was first performed in the Aeolian Hall on 25 June 1907. The composer attended both the rehearsals and the concert.

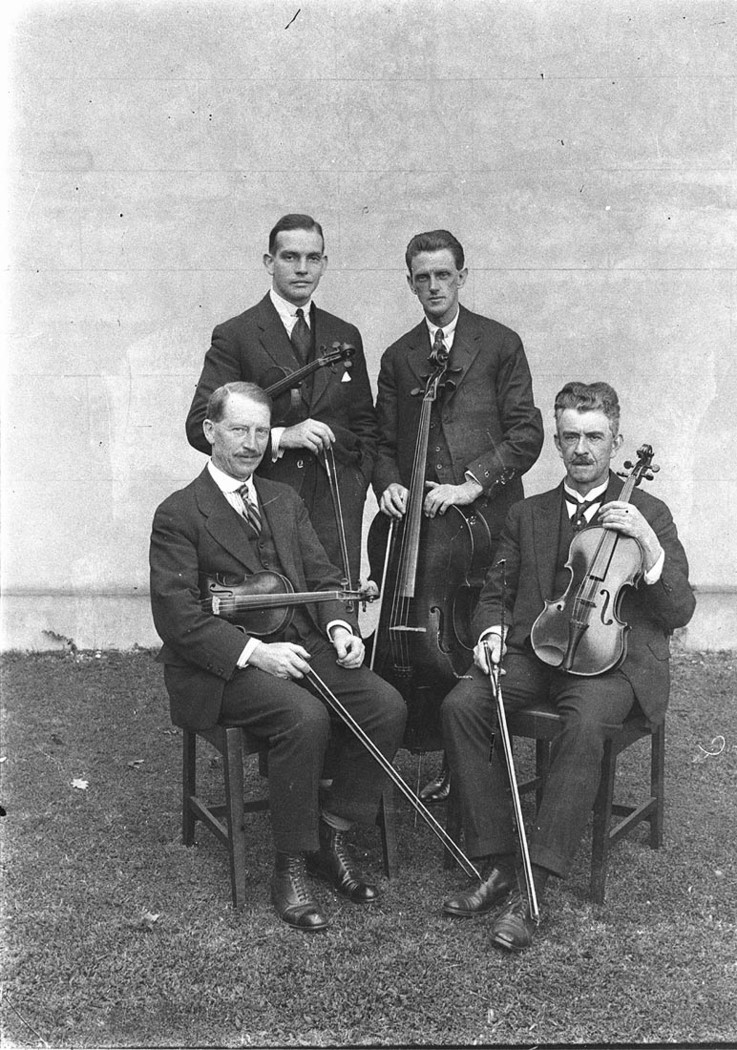
The New South Wales State Conservatorium Quartet: Walenn, Lionel Lawson, Gladstone Bell and Alfred Hill (Photo taken after 1924.)

In 1917 Walenn moved to Australia to follow a call for the position of a violin teacher at the Elder Conservatorium at Adelaide. Seven years later, in 1924 he took the same position at the New South Wales State Conservatorium of Music in Sydney and founded there the Conservatorium String Quartet with Lionel Lawson (violin), Alfred Hill (viola) and Gladstone Bell (cello).

Walenn was made a Fellow of the Royal Academy of Music, (F.R.A.M.) in 1936. As a composer his music has now been largely forgotten, though there is a modern recording of his brief Humoresque for violin and piano.

He died in 1942 at the age of 70 in Sydney after a brief illness.

== Compositions ==
- Butterfly
- Caprice for violin and orchestra
- Feuille d'album, for violin and piano
- Harlequinade, for violin and piano or orchestra (1900)
- Humoresque, for violin and piano
- Old Lavender, for violin and piano
- Quartet for two violins, cello and piano
- Romance & Allegro, for two violins, cello and piano
- Song of the desert
- Three Easy Pieces, for violin and piano
