= Lightbown Aspinall =

English wallpaper manufacturing company

Lightbown, Aspinall & Co. was an English wallpaper manufacturing company founded in 1854 at Pendleton in Greater Manchester, by Henry Lightbown (1819–99), who had worked for Potter and Company. By 1847, he was in business with his brother-in-law William Aspinall and Doctor Graham, a partner in Potter's, as wallpaper merchants and block printers in Manchester. The company became part of the newly formed Wall Paper Manufacturers in 1899. The company moved to a new factory, the Hayfield Mills on Brookfield Avenue, Bredbury, in 1929, where they became one of the largest producers of cheap machine-printed wallpapers in 20th century Britain, producing Crown and Scene wallpapers and Crown Vinyl wall covering, and employing 450 people.
