= Brook Green =

Area in London, England

Coordinates: 51.4964°N 0.2205°W

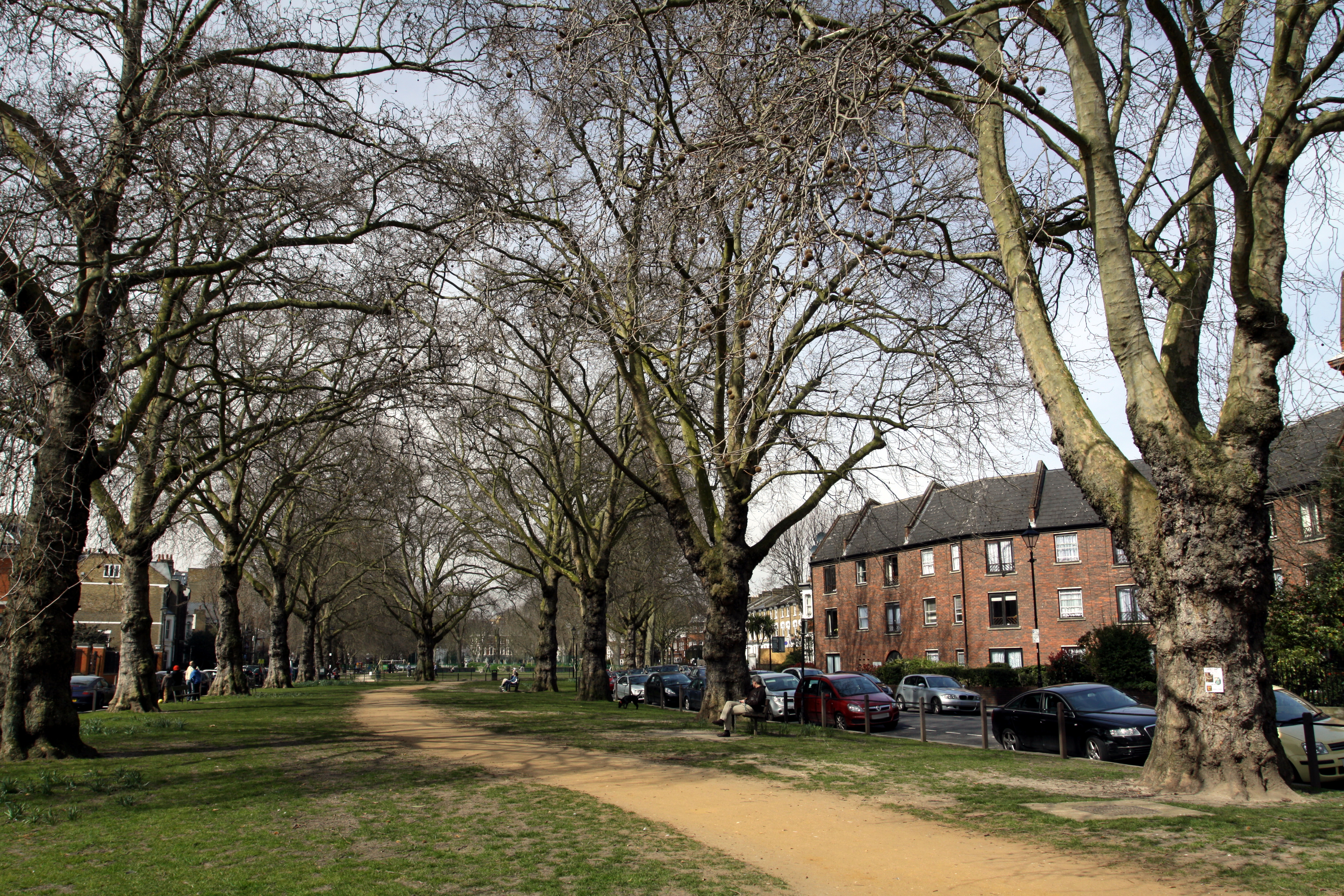
- Brook Green Parkspace

- Location within Greater London
- Population: (Addison and Avonmore and Brook Green wards 2011)
- London borough: Hammersmith & Fulham
- Ceremonial county: Greater London
- Region: London
- Country: England
- Sovereign state: United Kingdom
- Post town: LONDON
- Postcode district: W14, W6
- Dialling code: 020
- Police: Metropolitan
- Fire: London
- Ambulance: London
- UK Parliament: Hammersmith and Chiswick
- London Assembly: West Central

Brook Green is a sub-neighbourhood of Hammersmith in the London Borough of Hammersmith and Fulham. Located approximately 3.6 miles (5.8 km) west of Charing Cross, it is bordered by Kensington, Holland Park, Shepherd's Bush, Hammersmith and Brackenbury Village.

The Brook Green neighbourhood takes its name after the recreational park space also named Brook Green, which runs from Shepherd's Bush Road to Hammersmith Road.

The area is principally composed of tree-lined streets with Victorian townhouses and boasts a significant French and Italian, as well as growing Chinese, expatriate community.

Brook Green has two main shopping areas, Shepherd's Bush Road and Blythe Road, the latter of which is home to a number of small, independent shops. Brook Green is also close to Kensington High Street, King Street and Westfield London.

== History ==
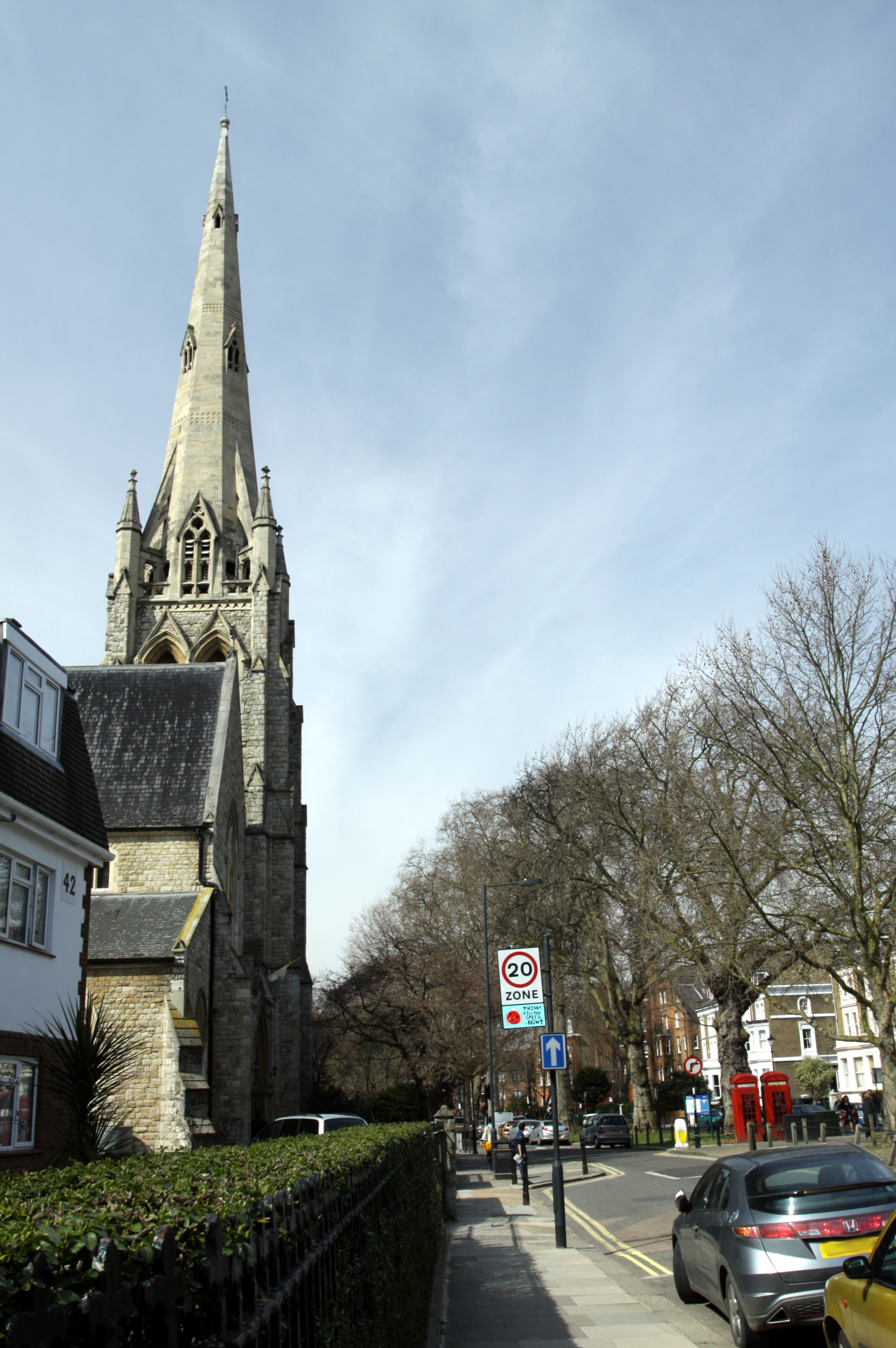
Holy Trinity, Brook Green

The name Brook Green is first recorded in 1493, and the hamlet was established by the 16th century. The area was developed as industrialisation spread out of London. Businesses in Brook Green included the J. Lyons and Co. and its complex at Cadby Hall, and Post Office Savings Bank Headquarters in Blythe Road. Brook Green was also home to St Mary's College from 1850 to 1925, when the college moved to Strawberry Hill.

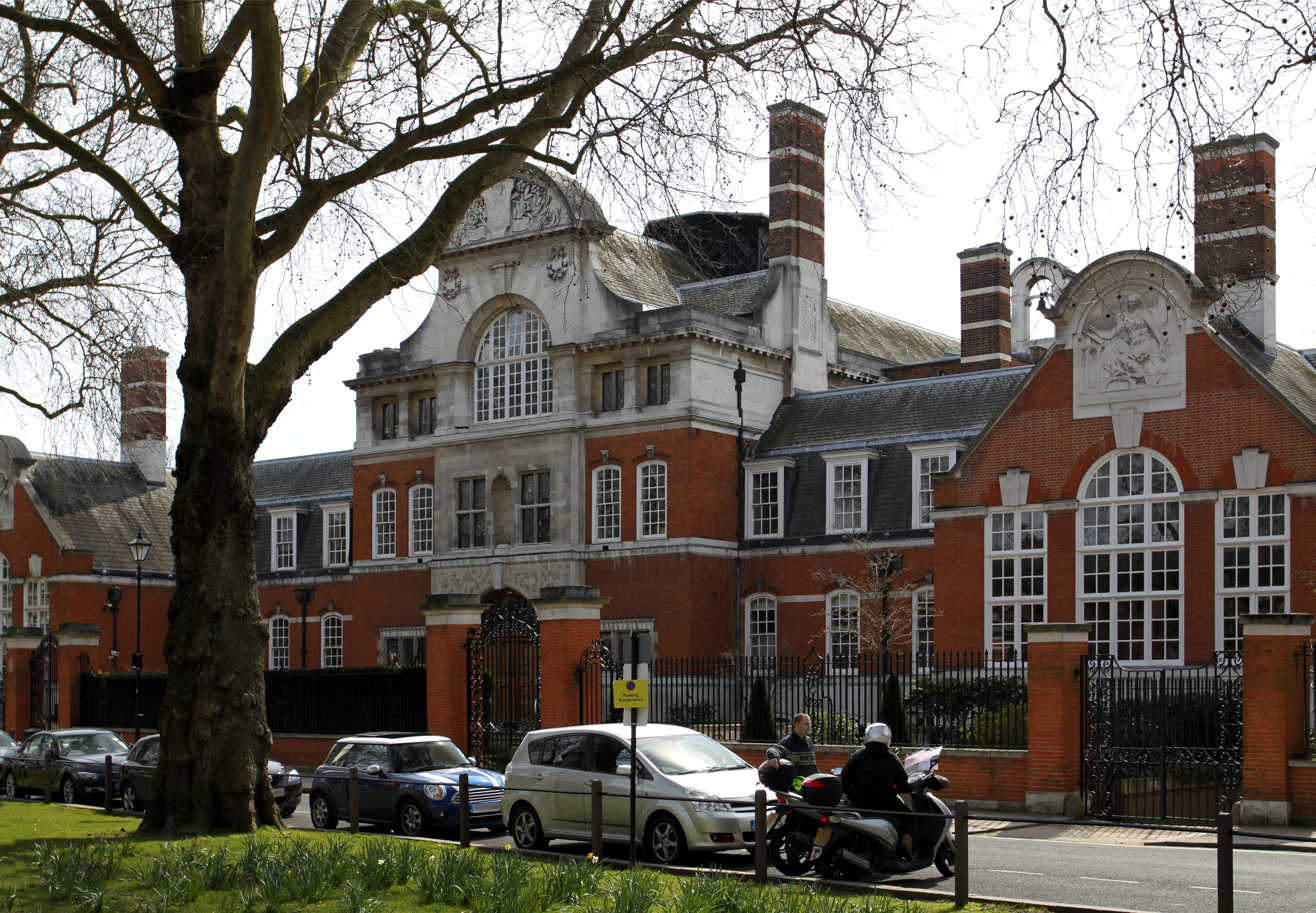
Main building of St Paul's Girls' School

St Paul's Girls' School, one of the leading independent schools in the country, has been situated on Brook Green since its foundation in 1904. The composer Gustav Holst was Director of Music at the school from 1905 to 1934, and in 1933 wrote Brook Green Suite for the school's junior orchestra.

The Brook Green Hotel has stood at the western end of Brook Green since 1886. The original brook, which was covered over in the 19th century, still flows under the hotel. The area's inns – the Brook Green Hotel and the Queen's Head – were originally coach houses, and became popular entertainment venues. Today, the Brook Green Hotel is a pub on ground level, along with a cocktail bar in the basement below and a hotel upstairs. The Queen's Head overlooks the green itself at the front and has a garden at the back.

Brook Green boasts four English Heritage blue plaques: they commemorate the artist Sir Frank Short, the composer Gustav Holst, the Silver Studio of design, and the writer Elizabeth Anne Finn (founder of the charity now known as Elizabeth Finn Care). There is also Brook Green Market and Kitchen, a FARMA certified farmers market in Addison Primary School.

== Politics ==
Brook Green is part of the Hammersmith and Chiswick constituency for elections to the House of Commons of the United Kingdom.

Brook Green is part of the Brook Green ward for elections to Hammersmith and Fulham London Borough Council.

== Education ==
- St Paul's Girls' School
- Bute House Preparatory School for Girls
- Wetherby Pembridge
- Ecole Francaise Jacques Prevert
- Kensington Wade
- St James Independent Schools
- Larmenier and Sacred Heart Catholic School
- Sacred Heart High School
- Addison CE Primary School
- Lena Gardens Primary School
- Avonmore Primary School
- St Mary's Catholic Primary School
- Lionheart Education (private tutorial college)

== Notable residents ==
- Mischa Barton
- Angelo Colarossi
- Richard Eyre
- Elizabeth Anne Finn
- Gustav Holst
- Francis Job Short
- Ken Suttle
- John Russell Taylor
- John Silvester Varley

== Notable businesses ==
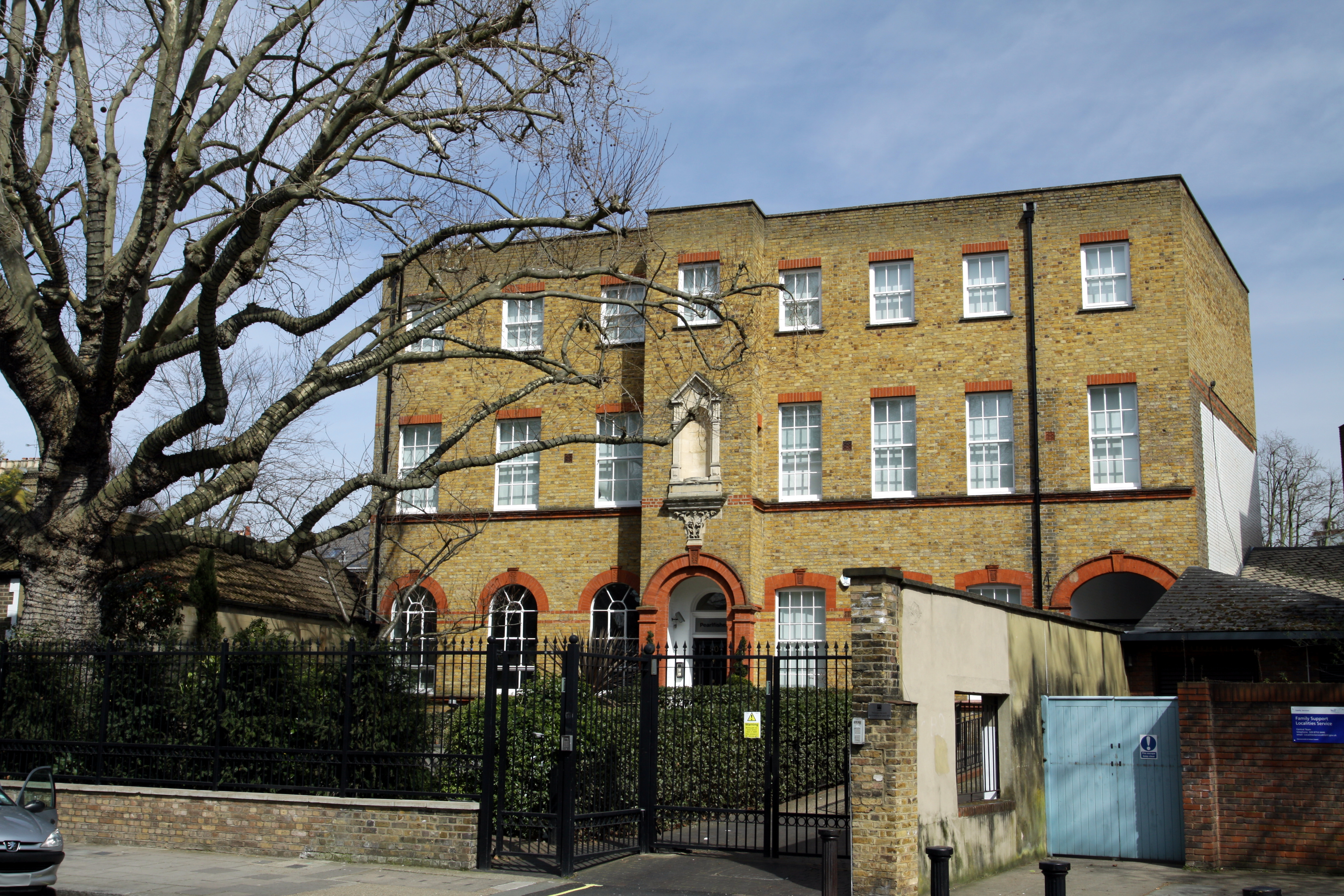
Pearlfisher's headquarters, The School House (formally Omnifone's head office and prior to that, Virgin's)

- Immediate Media Co
- Liberty Global
- Harrods
- L'Oréal
- Fever-Tree
- CH2M
- Charlotte Tilbury

Formerly:

- EMI
- The Silver Studio
- Omnifone
- Virgin

== Nearest places ==
Places adjoining Brook Green:

- Kensington
- Holland Park
- Hammersmith
- Shepherd's Bush
- West Kensington

== Transport ==
Stations:

- Kensington Olympia station
- Barons Court tube station
- Shepherd's Bush tube station
- Shepherd's Bush railway station
- Hammersmith tube station (Piccadilly and District lines)
- Hammersmith tube station (Circle and Hammersmith & City lines)
- Goldhawk Road tube station

London Underground Lines:

- District line
- Piccadilly line
- Hammersmith & City line
- Central line

== Cultural references ==
Brook Green, Hammersmith, appears as "Brugglesmith" in the Rudyard Kipling story of the same name which was first published in 1891. The story is a farce in which the narrator, who it is implied is William Thackeray, has to escort a drunken sailor back to his wife.

Brook Green is also mentioned in chapter four of Patrick Hamilton's 1928 novel Twopence Coloured as a place where accommodation can be found.

== See also ==
- Hammersmith and Fulham parks and open spaces
- 18 and 19 Brook Green
