= Charles Walenn =

English singer and actor (1867–1948)

Charles Walenn as Jack Point in The Yeomen of the Guard, c. 1906

Charles Roby Walenn (1867 – 30 May 1948) was an English singer and actor, best known for his performances in the comic baritone roles of the Gilbert and Sullivan operas with touring companies of the D'Oyly Carte Opera Company from 1887 to 1909 and later, off and on through the 1920s, with J. C. Williamson in Australia. Later in his career, he became known for London engagements in the title role of Rev. Spalding in The Private Secretary, which he first played at the Savoy Theatre in 1917, where he had never performed in the Savoy operas.

== Life and career ==
=== Early years and family ===
Walenn was born in Islington, London, England. His father William Henry Walenn was a scientist and worked for many years at the Patent Office in London. His mother, Skene Charlotte (née Barth, 1837–1927) was musically trained but did not perform professionally. Nevertheless, her interest led to music professions of several of her children: Herbert Walenn was a cellist and professor at the Royal Academy of Music, Charles was a singer, another brother was an organist, and Gerald Walenn and a sister were violinists. Two other children found their way into art professions. His brother Cecil, known as Cecil Barth, was a theatrical manager who purchased the rights to the farces The Private Secretary and Charley's Aunt.

From the age of 9, Walenn was a choir boy and sang solos in some of the principal churches and cathedrals in Britain. When his voice broke he turned his attention to analytical chemistry, but five years later he resumed his career as a singer. He married Amelia Emma Mary Rouseby, a singer and widow, in 1901 in London.

=== D'Oyly Carte years ===
Walenn, c. 1900

Beginning in April 1887 Walenn performed with the D'Oyly Carte Opera Company, first in its European tour that ended in February 1888, as a chorister and understudy. His first principal role with the company was a brief stint in the small role of Major Murgatroyd in Patience in 1888. He continued to sing chorus on tour thereafter. In early 1891 he appeared briefly in the leading role of Giuseppe in The Gondoliers, and in the middle of that year, he assumed the parts of Pish-Tush in The Mikado and Antonio in The Gondoliers, always on tour.

Finally, in September 1891, Walenn was promoted to play principal comic roles regularly in one of D'Oyly Carte's touring companies. His roles over the next dozen years were Jack Point in The Yeomen of the Guard, the Duke of Plaza-Toro in The Gondoliers, Bumbo in The Nautch Girl, Bedford Rowe in The Vicar of Bray, the McCrankie in Haddon Hall, Bunthorne in Patience, Scaphio in Utopia, Limited, Dick Deadeye and later Sir Joseph Porter in H.M.S. Pinafore, Peter Grigg in The Chieftain, Pish-Tush and later Ko-Ko and the title role in The Mikado, Mr. Cox in Cox and Box, Grand Duke Rudolph in The Grand Duke, the Lord Chancellor and later Lord Mountararat in Iolanthe, King Ferdinand and later Boodel in His Majesty, and John Wellington Wells in The Sorcerer, Prince Paul in The Grand Duchess of Gerolstein, King Ouf in The Lucky Star, the Usher in Trial by Jury, Hassan in The Rose of Persia, Pat Murphy and later Professor Bunn in The Emerald Isle and Mons. Sarsenet in Bob, a curtain raiser that played with H.M.S. Pinafore.

After the touring company closed at the end of 1903, Walenn left the D'Oyly Carte Opera Company for two years. In 1904, he played at least two roles in London: Boissy in the Amorelle at the Comedy Theatre and as Balthazar in La Poupee at the Prince of Wales's Theatre. From December 1905 to October 1907 and from October 1908 to March 1909, he joined another D'Oyly Carte touring company, playing the Learned Judge in Trial, Sir Joseph in Pinafore, General Stanley in Pirates, Bunthorne in Patience, the Lord Chancellor in Iolanthe, Gama in Princess Ida, Ko-Ko in Mikado, Jack Point in Yeomen, and the Duke in Gondoliers. He then left the company again.

=== Later years ===
Walenn's subsequent London engagements included a role in The Chocolate Soldier at the Lyric Theatre in 1911 and the title role, Rev. Robert Spalding, in The Private Secretary at the Savoy Theatre in 1917, where he had never performed in the Savoy operas. In between these roles, he toured for the first time with the J. C. Williamson Gilbert and Sullivan Opera Company in Australia, where he appeared in his familiar principal comic roles in Pinafore, Pirates, Patience, Iolanthe, Mikado, Yeomen, and Gondoliers from June to December 1914.

From 1920 to 1921 he toured again in Australia with Williamson in the Gilbert and Sullivan operas, playing the leading comic roles. He was back in London to reprise his role in The Private Secretary at the Playhouse Theatre in 1923 to 1924, then toured again with Williamson in his usual roles, adding one that he had never played before, Robin Oakapple in Ruddigore in 1927, thereby completing the Savoy opera series with a role in all thirteen extant Gilbert and Sullivan operas. It was also the first time that opera had been presented professionally in Australia. Walenn returned to appear in The Private Secretary in London at the Criterion Theatre (1929–1930) and the Apollo Theatre (1930–1931). His last role on the London stage was Cyrus Wykoff in the comedy Daddy Long Legs at the Victoria Palace (1933–1934).

Walenn died at age 80 in London.
