= Girton =

Girton may refer to:

- Girton, Cambridgeshire, England
- Girton, Nottinghamshire, England
- Girton College, Cambridge, Cambridgeshire, England
- Girton High School, Mumbai, India
- Girton Grammar School, Bendigo, Victoria, Australia

== See also ==
- Gerton, North Carolina
