= Urushibara =

Urushibara (written: 漆原) is a Japanese surname. Notable people with the surname include:

- Urushibara Mokuchu (漆原 木虫; 1888–1953), given name Yoshijirō, Japanese printmaker
- Yoshio Urushibara (漆原 良夫; born 1944), Japanese politician
- Yuki Urushibara (漆原 友紀; born 1974), Japanese manga artist

== See also ==
- Urushibara nickel, a nickel-based hydrogenation catalyst named in honor of chemist Yoshiyuki Urushibara
