= Bachoobai A. Moos =

Indian educationist

- Born: 17 June 1850; Mumbai, India
- Died: 30 July 1946 (aged 96)
- Occupation: Educator
- Years active: 1888-1946
- Known for: Founder Girton High School

Bachoobai Ardeshir Framji Moos (17 June 1850 to 30 July 1946) was an Indian educationist who was the first Parsi woman in India to establish a school for girls.

== Early life and education ==
Bachoobai Moos was the only daughter of Ardeshur Framji Moos. Her brother was Nanabhoy Ardeshir Moos who later joined the Colaba Observatory. She received her early education at the Frere Fletcher School in the Fort neighbourhood of Mumbai, where she excelled in piano.

In 1888 Moos founded Girton High School, then known as Miss Moos School for Girls, with five students. One of here earliest pupils was Dossibai Patell who later became the first woman to become a member of the Royal College of Surgeons of England (RCS).
