= Ernest Greenwood =

Ernest Greenwood may refer to:

- Ernest Greenwood (politician)
- Ernest Greenwood (artist)
