= Dossibai J. R. Dadabhoy oration =

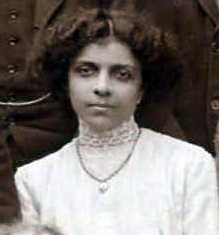
- Dossibai Patell

The Dossibai J. R. Dadabhoy oration is named after Dossibai Patell.

Years	Name	Lecture title	Notes	Image
1962	Hideo Yagi			
1966	Hector MacLennan			
	Jerusha Jhirad			
1970	M. K. Krishna Menon			
1974	Kaikhushru M. Masani	.		
1976	Kesho Ram Laumas			
1988	Linda Cardozo			
1995	Paul Devroey			
2020	Asma Khalil			
