= Redcliffe Road, London =

Street in Chelsea, London

Coordinates: 51°29′12″N 0°10′57″W

Redcliffe Road is a street in Chelsea, London that runs from Fulham Road to Cathcart Road.

In 1881, the artists' model Alexa Wilding was living at no 33, with her two young children.

Around the turn of the century, the Japanese artist and author Yoshio Markino had a studio at no 39 while living in Brixton.

During the First World War, it was home to Mary Koop and her conscientious objector husband, Charles Koop.

The sculptor Alice Lindley-Millican lived there at 3 Holbein Studios in 1922, as did the artists Edward Bawden and Eric Ravilious during the late 1920s and early 1930s. It was listed for sale at £5.45 million in 2016.

In the 1920s, the poet Roger Burford shared rooms in a boarding house there with the painter Stella Wilkinson (1903-1944) before they married in 1927, and Christopher Isherwood stayed in their rooms while they were away in Milan.

In the 1930s, Eileen Messenger staged joint exhibitions at her home there with her future husband Ernest Greenwood.

The artist, suffragist, and humanist Edith Mary Hinchley (1870–1940) died at her house there when it was totally obliterated during The Blitz; her body and those of her two lodgers not being found until five days later.

The doctor Ivy Evelyn Woodward lived there from 1948 until her death in 1957.

In the 1990s, Liz Hurley and her then partner Hugh Grant owned no 36.
