= Iris Brooke =

British artist

- Born: Iris Evelina Margery Brooke; 15 January 1905; Ryde, Isle of Wight, England
- Died: 22 June 1981 (aged 76); Teddington, England
- Education: Croydon School of Art; Royal College of Art
- Known for: Artist, author, illustrator

Iris Evelina Margery Brooke, later Iris Giffard (15 January 1905 – 22 June 1981) was a British artist, author and book illustrator who, throughout her career, concentrated on exploring the history of costume.

== Biography ==
Brooke was born at Ryde on the Isle of Wight in January 1905 and attended Bruntsfield High School on the island. From 1923 to 1926 she studied at the Croydon School of Art and then at the Royal College of Art in London until 1929, where her teachers included Randolph Schwabe. Throughout her subsequent career, Brooke created portraits in both oil and chalk but mainly concentrated on writing and illustrating books on historical costumes and fashion. She also wrote articles for a number of journals and was elected a member of the Women's Press Club.

In 1931, Brooke married Patrick Hopegood MacDowell but later divorced. They had a son, Michael. In 1944, she married William Hugh Giffard and the couple settled near Honiton in Devon.

== Books illustrated ==
- English Costume of the Nineteenth Century, 1929, by James Laver
- English Costume of the Eighteenth Century, 1931, by James Laver
- A Pageant of Kings and Queens, 1937, by Constance Mary Matthews & Charles Carrington
- Arpies and Sirens, 1942, by Susan Knowles.

== Books written and illustrated ==
- English Children's Costume Since 1775, 1930
- English Costume in the Age of Elizabeth, 1933
- English Costume of the Seventeenth Century, 1934
- English Costume of the Early Middle Ages, 1936
- A History of English Costume, 1937
- Western Europe costume and its relation to the theatre, 1939
- English Costume 1900–50, 1951
- Four Walls Adorned: Interior Decoration 1485–1820, 1952
- Pleasures of the Past, 1955
- English Costume of the Later Middle Ages, 1956
- Dress and Undress, 1958
- English Children's Costume Since 1775, 1958
- Costume in Greek Classic Drama, 1962
- Western European Costume and Its Relation to the Theatre, 1963
- Medieval Theatre Costume, 1967.
