= Andrew Kay Womrath =

American painter

- Born: 1869; Philadelphia
- Died: 1939 (aged 69–70)
- Occupation: Artist

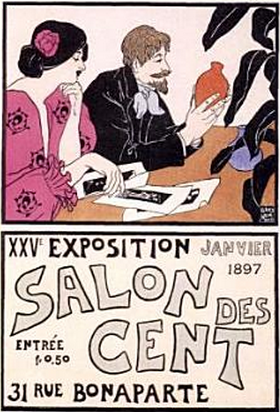
Poster for an 1897 exhibition at the Salon des Cent

Andrew Kay Womrath (1869–1939) was an American artist who became well known in France, although he was not widely recognized in the United States.

Andrew Kay Womrath was born in Philadelphia in 1869. He moved to London to study, and then went to Paris, working in both cities for several years. He studied under Urushibara Mokuchu, who bought many of his works. He often worked in advertising. Womrath's work includes drawings, woodblocks and watercolors. He contributed illustrations to the Summer and Winter volumes of The Evergreen: A Northern Seasonal published by Patrick Geddes and Colleagues in Edinburgh in 1896. His only known poster is an advertisement for a January 1897 exhibition of the Salon des Cent in Paris. It depicts a woman (Gertrude A. Kay ?) leafing through prints beside a somewhat Bohemian-looking man who is admiring a vase. In April 1896 a number of his drawings and book plates were exhibited in the Champs de Mars Salon. A reviewer in 1902 placed Andrew Kay Womrath in what he called the "Pictorial" group. Some of his colored woodcuts are now held in the British Museum.
