= Edith Carr (artist) =

British artist

Edith Carr (24 February 1875 – 29 January 1949) was a British artist, notable as a portrait and miniature painter.

== Biography ==
Carr was born in Croydon in south London, where her father was a merchant. After a private education, Carr studied at the Croydon School of Art and then in Paris at the Académie Delécluse where she was taught by Georges Callot. Carr painted miniatures and portraits and exhibited some twenty pieces at the Royal Academy in London. She was a member of the Royal Miniature Society and exhibited with the Society of Women Artists and at the Paris Salon between 1907 and 1943.
