= Irene Bache =

British artist (1901–1999)

- Born: 23 March 1901; Brockley, London
- Died: 24 May 1999 (aged 98); Gower, Swansea
- Education: Croydon School of Art; Central School of Arts and Crafts; Camberwell School of Art
- Known for: Painter and teacher

Irene Mary Bache (23 March 1901 – 24 May 1999) was a British artist. Although born in London, and widely travelled, Bache lived and established her career in Wales, in and around Swansea.

== Biography ==
Bache was born in Brockley in south London, the eldest of the four children born to Charles Bache, an insurance clerk and his wife Emily, both of whom were amateur painters. The family moved to Reigate in 1904 and Irene Bache went on to study at the Croydon School of Art, the Central School of Arts and Crafts and Camberwell School of Art. She taught art in a series of schools in Croydon, Peterborough, Worthing and Whitchurch before lecturing for a short time at the Royal College of Art.

In 1942 Bache was appointed head of the Arts and Crafts department at Swansea College of Education, a post she retained until her retirement in 1966. She brought radical ideas on pupil participation to the teaching of art and was active as an artist in her own right. She participated in a number of group shows in Swansea and Cardiff and became active within the Swansea Art Society serving as both its Chair' and Vice-President at different times. She had a solo exhibition at the Glynn Vivian Art Gallery in Swansea during 1954 and the College of Education mounted a retrospective to mark her retirement in 1966.

After her retirement, Bache set up a private studio and continued to teach and paint, specialising in landscapes and botanical subjects. She continued to participate in group shows and exhibited at the National Eisteddfod of Wales in 1974. In 1981 she published and illustrated Gower Poems, a volume inspired by the Gower Peninsula where she was living. She supplied illustrations for a 1992 volume on wild mushrooms. Solo shows of her work were held to mark her ninetieth birthday both at the Glynn Vivian Gallery and elsewhere in Swansea.
