= Ryuson Chuzo Matsuyama =

Japanese watercolour landscape artist

- Born: 松山 忠三 (Matsuyama Chūzō); 1880; Aomori, Japan
- Died: 1 January 1954 (aged 74)
- Education: Chelsea School of Art
- Known for: Painting, watercolour

Ryuson Chuzo Matsuyama (松山 忠三, Matsuyama Chūzō; 1880 – 1954) was a Japanese watercolour landscape artist who worked in England during the first half of the 20th century.

== Biography ==
Ryuson Chuzo Matsuyama was born in Aomori, Japan in 1880. Around 1911, he travelled to England to develop his skill as an artist in watercolour, becoming a member of a significant group of Japanese artists working in London in the years preceding and after World War I. He was a contemporary of fellow expatriate artists Urushibara Mokuchu, Yoshio Markino and Kurihara Chuji. In October 1914, he married Mabel Davies in Chelsea. During the war, he worked with the British Red Cross in providing support and entertainment for wounded soldiers in art and lacquerwork and, later, in displays of Judo and Kendo, firstly at Kitchener House in Hyde Park and subsequently at Richmond House, Surrey, earning a British Red Cross Society Commendation. Unlike the majority of the Japanese community, who returned home as a result of anti-Japanese feeling during the Second Sino-Japanese War and World War II, Matsuyama appears to have remained in Britain, becoming a naturalised British Citizen in 1947.

== Art ==
Like the painter Sato Takezou, Matsuyama studied at the Chelsea School of Art, while also working as a decorative painter, restorer and lacquer repairer. He exhibited his watercolours widely within the Japanese community, including at the Japanese Club in Cavendish Square, as noted in the London newspaper of the Japanese community, the Nichiei Shinshi. He was also, however, an active and successful member of the British art world, exhibiting from 1916 at the Royal Academy, as well as at the Royal Scottish Academy, with the National Portrait Society and regional art galleries. He was a member of the Holborn artists’ society and was elected an Associate of the British Watercolour Society – an honour he was asked to resign in 1947, in the aftermath of World War II.

Matsuyama’s subject matter ranged from floral still lifes and interiors to delicate representations of the English countryside, often carefully annotated with date and location. He was best known as a landscapist, painting scenes of London and Surrey, particularly the area around his home in Holmwood near Dorking, but also undertook picturesque painting tours to Cornwall, North Wales and the Lake District. However, he appears never to have been able to devote his life entirely to painting, earning a living as a decorative painter in country houses, and, from 1926, working full time as a theatrical and scene painter in London's West End.

A major exhibition of his work was held in 1987 by J Collins & Son of Bideford, with catalogue notes provided in association with one of Matsuyama’s sons.
