= Jonathan Wolstenholme =

British artist and illustrator (born 1950)

Jonathan Wolstenholme (born 1950) is a British artist and illustrator.

== Early life ==
Wolstenholme was born in 1950, and was educated at Purley Grammar School, before graduating from Croydon Art College, which he attended from 1969 to 1972.

== Career ==
Wolstenholme has been a freelance illustrator for many years, working for leading advertising agencies, publishers and a huge number of magazines.

He has had several one-man shows in London, and has exhibited at the Singer and Friedlander Exhibition several times, and also at the Discerning Eye Competition at the Mall Galleries, winning the main £3,000 ING Purchase Prize in 2002. In 1997, an exhibition of Wolstenholme's work was shown in New York City at the "Works on Paper" fair.

Wolstenholme is known for his detailed works deriving from a love of old books and of the paraphernalia associated with a bygone age whose hallmarks were finely skilled labour and craftsmanship in the production of all manner of objects.

In 2017, his work has sold at Christie's auction house, as part of The Astor Collection from Tillypronie, Aberdeenshire, which The Daily Telegraph described as "the best collection" of sporting art "that will ever come on to the market".

== Illustrated works ==
- An Old Fashioned Christmas by Iris Grender (Hutchinson, 1979) ISBN 978-0091360405
- The Diary of Samuel Pepys (Haffmann, 2011)
- Alice in Wonderland (Haffmann, 2012)
- Grimms Fairy Tales

== Personal life ==
Wolstenholme is married, with two children, and lives in London.
