= Alice Lindley-Millican =

British artist

- Born: Alice Lindley; 1885
- Died: 1930 (aged 44–45)
- Education: Manchester School of Art
- Known for: Sculpture
- Elected: Royal Society of British Sculptors

Alice Lindley-Millican (1885–1930) was a British sculptor known for her figurative works.

== Personal life ==
In early 1917, during the First World War, Alice Lindley married Albert Millican in Stockport, Cheshire.

In 1915 and 1919 Lindley-Millican's address was recorded as 'The Lilacs' in Mottram-in-Longendale, Manchester. She later moved to London and in 1922 was listed by the Royal Academy at 3 Holbein Studios, 52 Redcliffe Road in South Kensington. This property was particularly suitable as there was a studio in the roof space, converted during the 1920s. It was occupied by the artists Edward Bawden and Eric Ravilious during the late 1920s and early 1930s. In 1927 Lindley-Millican was contactable through the Three Arts Club, 19a Marylebone Road, London.

Alice Lindley-Millican died in November 1930.

== Artwork ==
From 1908 to around 1912, Alice studied at the Manchester School of Art and exhibited during this period. She worked in several materials, including marble and plaster.

Lindley-Millican continued to exhibit regularly throughout her professional career. She showed twice at the Royal Academy of Arts, once in 1915 and again in 1922. She also exhibited at the Royal Cambrian Academy of Art in 1910, 1919 and finally in 1923 with her sculpture Baby and Frog. In 1926 she exhibited her sculpture Energy at Manchester Art Gallery as part of the Exhibition of Work by Manchester Artists. Lindley-Millican exhibited with the Royal West of England Academy in 1927–1928.

Lindley-Millican was a member of the Royal Society of British Sculptors from 1928 until her death.

Two of her sculptures are held by public collections in the United Kingdom; a plaster bust of Reverend Canon Winfield from 1910 at the Towneley Hall Art Gallery & Museum and a marble bust of Henry Enfield Dowson from 1914 at Harris Manchester College, University of Oxford.
