= Mary Koop =

British fashion designer

- Born: Mary Bredall; 1884
- Died: 1967 (aged 83); Sussex, England
- Education: Croydon School of Art
- Occupation: Artist

Mary Koop (née Bredall, 1884–1967) was a British artist.

She was born Mary Bredall in 1884, and studied at the Croydon School of Art and the London School of Art.

After she completed her training, she worked for London Underground.

In 1915, she married Charles Frederick Rayner Koop (1882–1966) in Kensington, London. He was a fellow artist, and they lived at 21 Redcliffe Road, South Kensington, London. He was a conscientious objector during the First World War, and was first imprisoned at Wormwood Scrubs and then as an alternativist undertook compulsory civilian work at the Home Office Scheme on Dartmoor instead.

In 1925, she designed a poster, "Summer sales quickly reached by Underground" for the Underground Electric Railway Company Ltd. She exhibited three times at the Royal Academy.

She died in Sussex in 1967, aged 83.

In 2013, her "Summer sales" poster appeared on a Royal Mail postage stamp, part of a set marking the 150th anniversary of the London Underground.
