= Yoshio Markino =

Japanese-British artist (1869–1956)

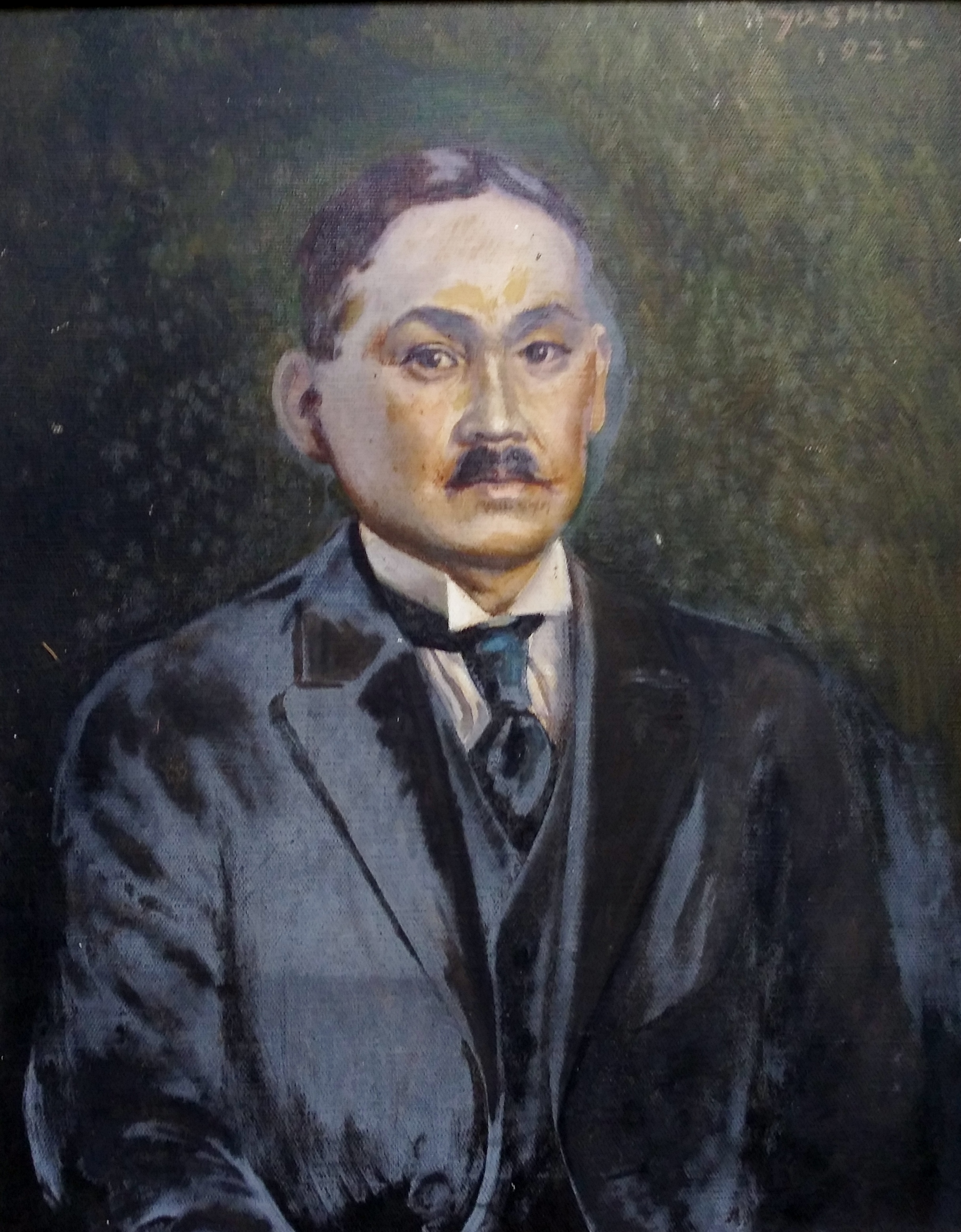
- Yoshio Markino c.1920
- Born: 25 December 1869; Koromo, Toyota, Aichi, Japan
- Died: 18 October 1956 (aged 86); Japan
- Occupations: Artist, Writer
- Known for: Watercolours, Illustrations
- Notable work: The Colour of London (1907), A Japanese Artist in London (1910)
- Spouse: Marie Piron (m. 1922; div. 1927)

Yoshio Markino (牧野 義雄, Makino Yoshio; 25 December 1869 – 18 October 1956) was a Japanese artist and author who from 1897 – 1942 was based in London. During the Edwardian years of 1903 – 1915 he was the most well known Japanese person living in London, and was widely praised for bridging the Japanese and Western artistic aesthetic in his artwork, particularly in his depiction of London's fog, gaslights and wet streets, which became his hallmark. Like his contemporaries Whistler and Monet, he viewed the London fog from an outsider's point of view and marvelled at the effect it had on light, both natural and artificial. Markino became known affectionately as Heiji of London Fog, and wrote: 'I think London without mists would be like a bride without a trousseau'. His autobiography A Japanese Artist in London, published in 1910 and written in an eccentric style, described his years of extreme poverty in London while trying to establish himself as an illustrator and artist. From his early years he was fascinated by Western culture and remained a committed Anglophile all his life.

== Biography ==
Markino was born in the town of Koromo, Toyota, Aichi, Japan, named Makino Heijirō at birth. He was the youngest of 3 children, Yoshi (the oldest daughter) and Toshitarō (the oldest son). His mother was Makino Katsu, and his father was Makino Toshimoto, who founded and taught at their Koromo Primary School. His grandfather was an artist named Bai Yen. The Makino family was an old samurai family (see Chōnin) – although as a result of changes in the structure of Japanese society, the samurai class had been abolished by 1873.

In July 1875, he began his education at the Koromo School in Japan, and in 1880 started to study Bunjinga with his brother under Tamegai Chikko until graduating in October 1883. From August 1884, he taught at the Otani School in Chita-gun, resigning in the autumn of that year, when he was adopted into the Isogai family (who were distant relatives), changing his name to Makino Yoshio. He then began working in Hagiwara Primary School until he moved to live with his biological father in Toyoaki City. In 1886, he became an assistant teacher at Haruki Primary School, working and living with his brother Toshitarō. It was in 1886 that Markino started to learn Yōga sketching techniques under Nozaki Kanekiyo and Mizuno Manji. In October 1887, he began working as a designer for the Nagoya Design Company in Nagoya.

In November 1887, he began studies at the Nagoya Eiwa School under a scholarship from American Protestant missionaries, studying English and the Chinese classics. In 1889, he applied to join the military but was rejected after failing the physical examination. In 1890, he borrowed money from his sister (then Fujishima Kyo), so he could stay in Yokohama with his cousin Hotta Maki, graduating that summer from Nagoya Eiwa.

Markino was curious about, and attracted to, Western culture and in 1893, aged 24, he obtained a travel permit to the United States to study. He left Japan from Yokohama on The Peru, arriving in San Francisco in July 1893. Through a letter of introduction to the Japanese Consul of San Francisco, he gained assistance from Suzuki Utsujirō who encouraged Markino to pursue his artistic career.

In November 1893, Markino started his tuition at the Mark Hopkins Institute of Art. In 1894, he received news that his father had died. In April 1895, Yone Noguchi visited Markino. During this time he mastered his 'silk veil' technique allowing him to depict his signature fog and mist watercolour style 'to paint the thick fog that rolled in from the sea at certain times of the year'. This technique was to play an important part in the development of his style in the later artworks produced in London.

In June 1897, after being introduced by correspondence with Sakurai Shozo to Hayashi Tadamasa, a Paris-based Japanese art dealer, he travelled to New York, where in August he met Miyake Katsumi (a yoga style painter) at the Japan Assembly Hall.

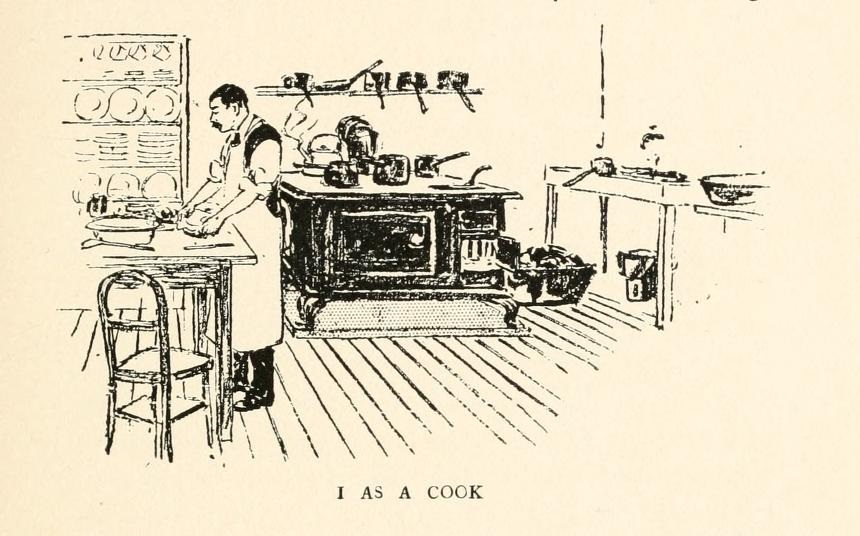
When I was a child Print Yoshio Markino

While in the United States between 1893 and 1897, Markino worked in numerous jobs and suffered racial discrimination. He was spat on in public in California (where anti-Japanese sentiment was high due to the growing population of Issei). He experienced limited opportunities based on his societal status, and difficulty finding decent employers, working as a house-boy for a dollar and a half a day. He was insulted further when his first employer refused to learn his Japanese name saying it was too difficult to remember and instead referred to him as 'Charlie'. Speaking to the reporter Frank Harris on religious intolerance, he noted 'the Christian hypocrisy is far worse in America than in England. When I used to say in San Francisco that I was not a Christian, they used to turn from me as if I had said I was decaying. It is an ignorant, thoughtless people.'

In November 1897, Markino travelled from New York to Paris to meet Tadamasa Hayashi, a prominent dealer in Japanese art, but by that time Hayashi had returned to Japan.

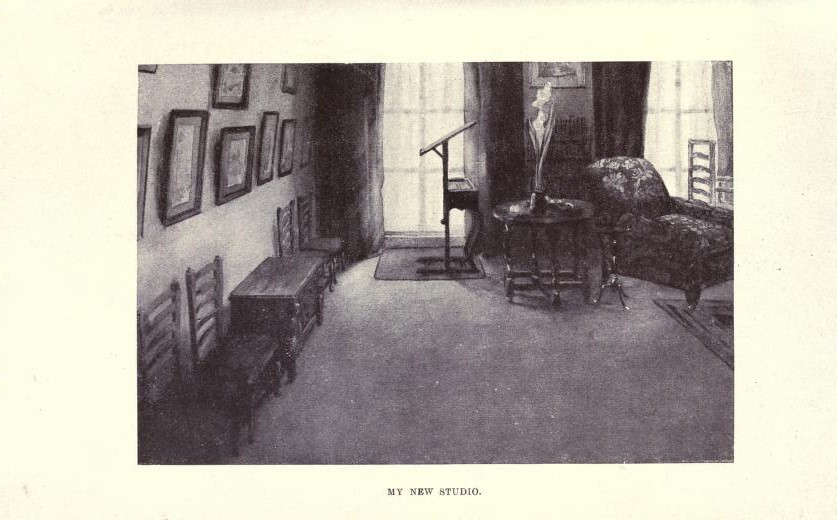
39 Redcliffe Kensington London

By December, Markino had decided to move to London on the advice of Ide Umataro, who he had met during his time studying art. From 1898, he began working in the Japanese Naval Inspector's Office in London by day and studying at the South Kensington College of Science by night. In March 1898, he began studying at the Goldsmith Technical College. In 1900, he switched to the Central School of Art and Design where he worked as an artist's model and later designed tomb-stone markers for just 3 months, as he had offended conservative religious mourners by his depiction of angels as 'ballet dancers'. Incredibly poor, he would often visit publishers for day-to-day work. He walked everywhere as he had no money for the public transport, and lived on 'Bovril and rice'. He kept a studio at 39 Redcliffe Road, South Kensington, while living in Brixton.

In March 1901, the Naval Inspector's Office closed due to completing the order of warships which were being sent to Japan. Although given £30 severance pay to cover the return fare to Japan, Markino decided to stay in London where he spent most of his subsequent life and career. He instead spent the money on art supplies and rent. Given his financial straits, Markino became downtrodden. He was eventually encouraged by Henry Wilson who was fond of

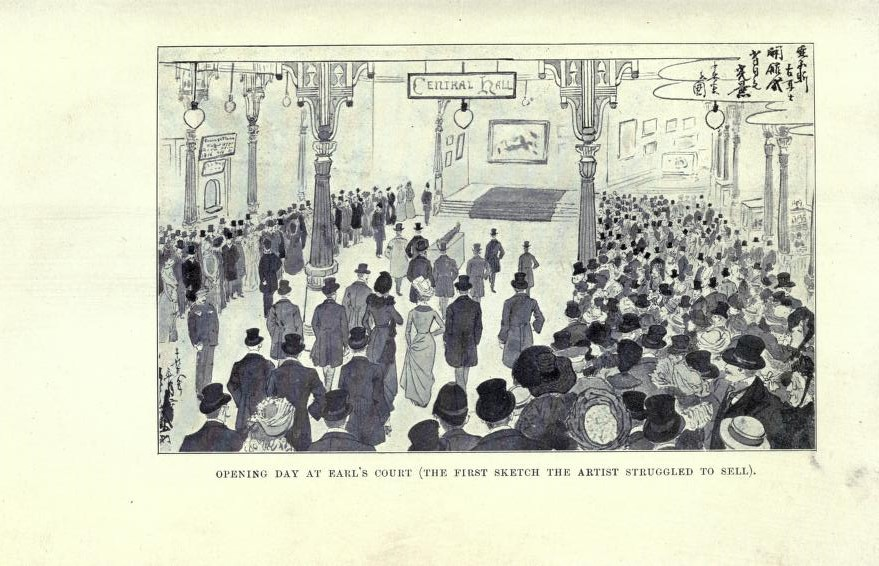
The first work Markino sold in England

Japanese art. Wilson promised to introduce Markino to Charles Holmes, the editor of The Studio, who was also known to be fond of the vogue for Japanese woodcuts.

In November 1901, his works were published in The Studio, introducing Markino as an artist to the British public. In December, he met Hirobumi Ito. In February 1902, he published Japanese Children's Stories with the publisher Grants Richard, and provided illustrations for King Magazine. By October 1902, his work began to become increasingly popular. From November 1902, he began living with Noguchi in Brixton. At this stage in his career, Markino frequently had little income. In 1903, his work appeared in The English Illustrated Magazine and he illustrated Noguchi's From the Eastern Sea for Unicorn Press. In August his work was published in the Magazine of Art, whose editor Marion Spielmann was fond of Markino's sketches. He took him under his wing and introduced Markino to a wider Edwardian social circle, while encouraging him to draw, paint and write. Spielmann also introduced him to Douglas Sladen, who would invite Markino to his Kensington home for tea and art parties.

In 1904, the Japanese artist Hara Bushō moved in with Markino until May 1905. In September 1905, Markino was nominated as a judge for the Venice Great Art Exposition representing the British Art Association. Based on the recommendation of Spielmann, he received a membership as a research student of national museums in Britain.

On the 8th May 1907, his illustrations of London, were published in The Colour of London to widespread critical acclaim. At the same time, the book's illustrations were shown at an exhibition of his works in Clifford Gallery in Haymarket. However, from May until June of that year, he was hospitalized in West London due to complications from a gastrointestinal operation.

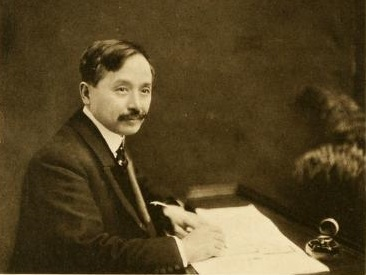
Yoshio Markino in 1912

In August 1907, Markino returned to Paris when his publishers asked him to produce The Colour of Paris as a companion volume to The Colour of London. He stayed in Paris until June 1908, and during this period met Auguste Rodin at the home of Leon Benedite. In late 1908, The Colour of Paris was published in England by Chatto and Windus.

Markino lived in Rome from October 1908 to May 1909 to illustrate the final volume in a three part book series The Colour of Rome, which was published by Chatto and Windus later in 1909. From July to October 1910, he stayed with his friends the Sladens and the writer Olave Potter, researching for illustrations to accompany Potter's book A Little Pilgrimage in Italy. Olave and Markino were said to have been romantically involved at the time.

In May 1909, he returned to Paris from Rome, staying till June of that year. He returned to London in September to work on Oxford from Within, and stayed in Oxford to research the new book. In 1910, with the publication of A Japanese artist in London and Oxford from Within, he guided friends around the Japan–British Exhibition, and he appeared in that year's Who's Who (and the years following until 1949). From late 1910, he traveled with the suffragette Christabel Pankhurst lecturing on women's voting rights in the United Kingdom. During this time, Makino anglicised his name to Markino to prevent it being mispronounced as Maykino.

In 1911, he produced a painting of Windsor Castle to celebrate Queen Mary's coronation, which was given to the Queen and published in The English Review. Later in the year he also presented to Queen Mary an engraving of Buckingham Palace from Green Park. 1912 was to prove his most productive period of writing, with the publication of My Idealed John Bullesses, When I was a Child, and The Charm of London, followed in 1913 by Recollections and Reflections of a Japanese Artist.

With the outbreak of World War I in 1914, Markino stopped sketching outdoors due to restrictions imposed on foreign nationals by the British government, and took up the study of English literature, philosophy, Greek and Latin. In 1915, Markino lectured on ethics and philosophy at the University of Edinburgh. In the same year, he contributed the stage design for a production of Madame Butterfly at the London Opera House for Vladimir Rosing's Allied Opera Season. From 1918 he continued to write, paint and lecture, although his popularity had started to wane with the death of influential friends in World War I.

In 1922, he lectured on comparative philosophy and Western and Asian art theory at Magdalen College, Oxford. In 1923, he married the young French woman Marie Piron in Paris, and on the 18th of October they moved to New York. In 1924, his wife's sister came from Pittsburg to join them, and in May 1925 they moved to Boston. His work "The Plaza Hotel, New York City" (1924) was completed during this time. In Boston, Markino lectured on Eastern and Western philosophy, and on social issues, including racial discrimination, likely recounting many of his negative experiences in San Francisco during his first stay in America. He continued to have trouble selling his work, which prompted his return to London in 1927, while Marie stayed in America. Markino divorced Marie in September 1927, with the marriage ending on the grounds that it had never been consummated. Markino described the relationship as being 'like sister and brother'. On arrival in London, he found all his belongings that had been left with a Japanese resident of London had been sold. He managed to set up another exhibition and sell his watercolours, but due to his time away from the literary scene, he was regarded as outdated and started to live a bohemian lifestyle with English and Japanese friends from then on.

At the outbreak of war with Germany in 1939, Markino continued to live in London. In that year, artworks belonging to the noted collector Kojirō Matsukata, including several paintings by Markino, were lost in a fire while in storage in London. Markino only finally returned to Japan in 1942 when England declared war on Japan and passage on the repatriation ship Tatsuta Maru was arranged for the Japanese living in Britain at the time. In December 1942, Markino travelled to China and stayed at the Japanese embassy in Nanjing. He returned to Japan in 1943 and close to the end of the war moved to Nikkō, then finally settling in Kamakura.

In 1952, he met Carmen Blacker in Kamakura, who was studying ascetic Buddhism there. Blacker described Markino as walking up a set of temple steps, in 'a shirt covered in smears of blue and green paint ... a sketchbook in his hand' rambling for almost four hours in English and Japanese rushing up the steps out of breath aged 83 noting 'how happy he had been in London, and that he had never wanted to leave [as] he had so many friends, and was never tired of sketching the people and painting the mists.'

Markino remained a devoted Anglophile for the rest of his years in Japan. In 1952 he attended a party at the British Embassy in Tokyo where he would gift the British diplomats with a copy of his Thames Embankment in Winter woodblock print. Markino died at the age of 87 on October 18 of a cerebral haemorrhage in Kamakura.

== Writing ==
Among his friends and acquaintances were the writers Yone Noguchi who introduced him to Arthur Ransome, M. P. Shiel, and the artist Pamela Colman Smith. Although unnamed, he plays an important role in Ransome's Bohemia in London, and is considered to have been the model for the male protagonist in Shiel's book The Yellow Wave (1905) – a Romeo and Juliet-type tragic romance on the background of the Russo-Japanese War of 1904–1905.

He was invited by the English Review to write a series of essays and to author a signed weekly column with the Evening News in 1910 and another column in the Daily News in 1911. Markino's literary talents were widely recognized in London, and with the support of friends like Douglas Sladen he published several autobiographical works, including A Japanese Artist in London (1910), When I was a Child (1912), and My Recollections and Reflections (1913). Markino's style was appreciated by British readers who enjoyed his unique humour.

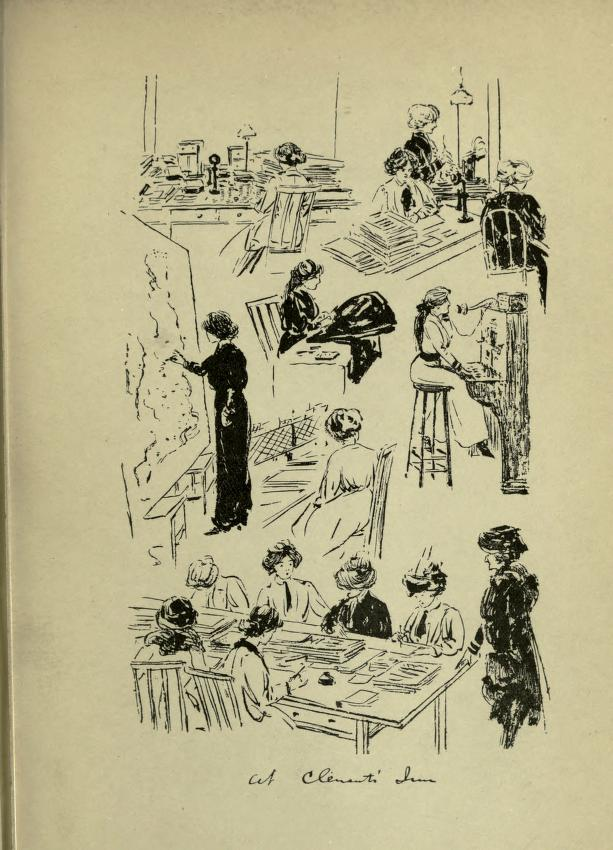
John Bullesses

His writings were also supportive of the suffragette movement and he had many female friends. His 'Idealised John Bullesses' and biographies frequently note his interactions with, and support for, women's marches and suffragettes like Christabel Pankhurst. Sarah Grand noted he was 'a thorough gentleman' when reading his writings in 1912. Another friend, Flora Roscoe; an Englishwoman who lived in the hamlet of Wedhampton; knowing how Markino had a hatred of business (something which he believed the English took too seriously) invited him in 1912 to stay to sketch the area, later travelling to Salisbury. Another time in a Markino fashion he met Adeline Genée:

I had an appointment with Adeline Genée to meet her by the stage entrance of the Empire some years ago; my friend was with me when I went there. I was going to interview her by some paper's request. I was sitting by the stage entrance when I soon found a lady no longer young nor beautiful; she was, however, a most delightful person to talk with. How anxious I was to get rid of her as I had an important work of seeing Adeline Genée. Strangely enough she was quite composed, with no visible intention of leaving me alone; my friend who saw me slightly tired and disinterested, asked me loudly if I wished to leave the place. I jumped up and explained; "Why, I must see Madame Genée!" My friend began to laugh almost wildly and exclaimed again: "Markino, you have been talking there with Madame Genée more than half an hour.

== Stagework ==
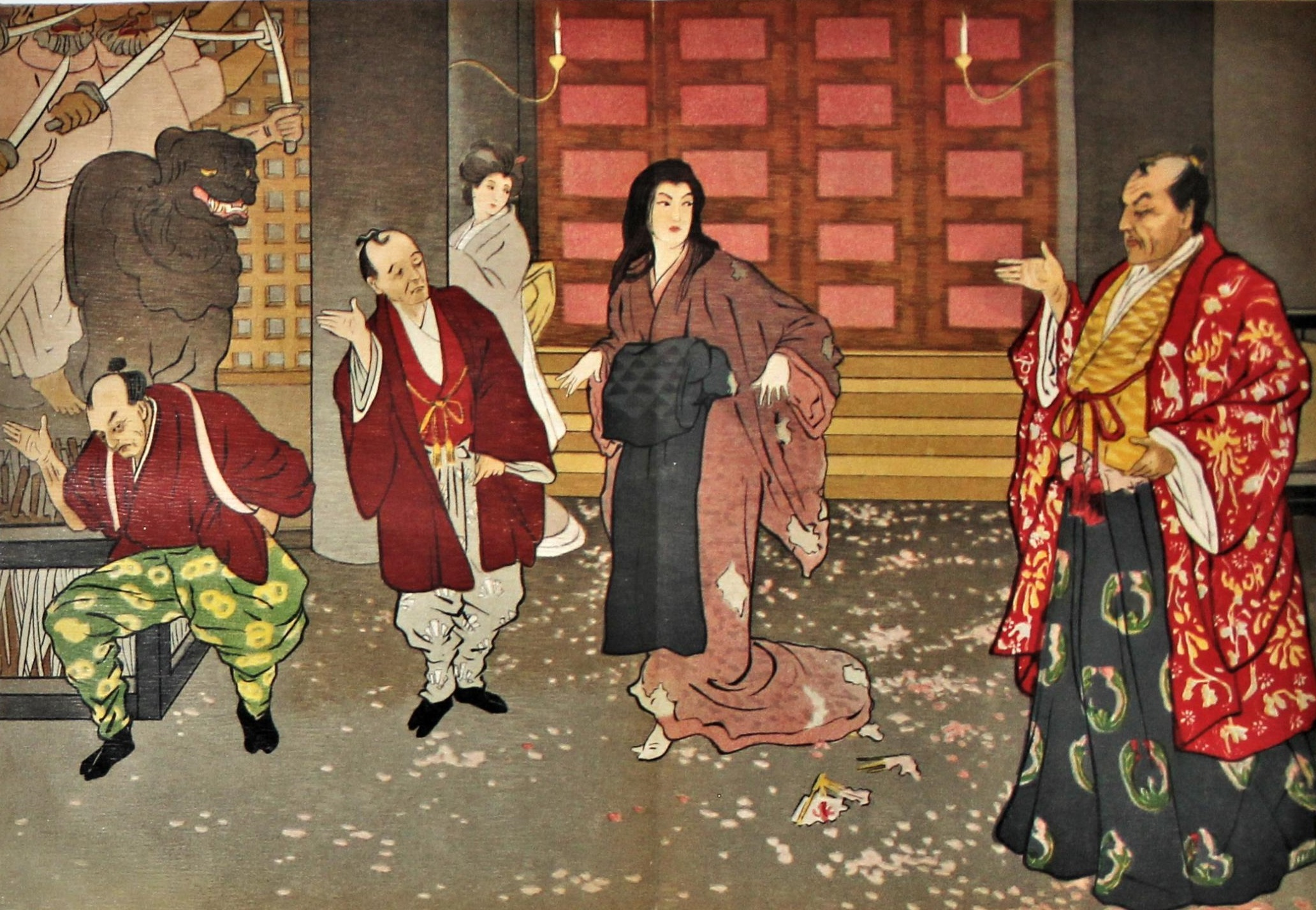
Darling of the Gods 1903

During 1900, Markino witnessed the kabuki performances of Otojirō Kawakami in London. In December 1903 he advised on costume and set design for Kamigami no Choji performed at Her Majesty's Theatre, and designed the theatre program.

In 1915 he co-produced a season of Russian, French and Italian Opera at the London Opera House. Directed by Vladimir Rosing, the season included the first performance by the Japanese singer, Tamaki Miura as Cio-Cio-San in Madama Butterfly.

== Art style ==
Markino was a popular member of a significant group of expatriate Japanese artists working in London, including Urushibara Mokuchu, Ishibashi Kazunori, Hara Busho and Matsuyama Ryuson. He was and continues to be best known for his childlike whimsy and mannerisms which Hara Basho noted:

There are thousands of artists who can use their brushes better than you. Then why do all your English friends admire your work so much? Because of your own personality. You are very faithful to everybody and everything. This nature of yours appears quite unconsciously in every picture of yours. Indeed, some of your pictures are full of faults—but very innocent and delightful faults, which make me smile. ... [to which Markino] exclaims: "But don't you see how poor is my art: Who am I after all? Proper name for me is an art lover.

On his Whitechapel exhibit in 1910 the critic and Japanese art specialist Laurence Binyon criticized 'the ever popular colours, "best known and most prized in Europe, while ... the least valued in Japan' present in the watercolours based on dispelling the notion of the time which Oscar Wilde called in his 'The Decay of Lying' essay 'pure invention', Binyon was dissuaded by the toned down colour pallette which pandered to Europeans, instead wishing that 'a loan exhibition may be formed which shall at least adumbrate the range and history of [Japanese] art'.

=== Mist ===
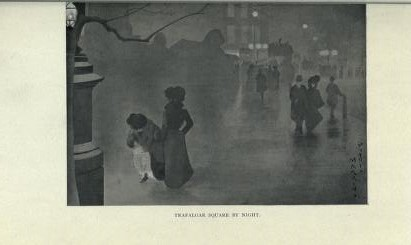
(1907)

Dissatisfied with the fogs of San Francisco, Heiji of the fog moved to London to 'produce "a study of London mists". Markino noted 'When I came to London first, I thought the buildings, figures, and everything in the distance, looked comparatively large, because in Japan the atmosphere is so clear that you can see every small detail in the distance, while here your background is mystified abruptly, which has great charm to me.' His favourite mist was the 'gentle mist [where] London becomes a city of romance' or with its 'autumn mists'. 'London looks ten times nicer if you see her through the mist.'

Markino would use oil paints by blending the primary colour with its opposite colour to achieve 'the silk veil technique. "I can achieve a very soft colour by mixing in oils the strongest primary colour with its opponent colour . . . I made many other discoveries and was able to achieve some sense of light while trying to draw a silken veil".

=== Fog ===
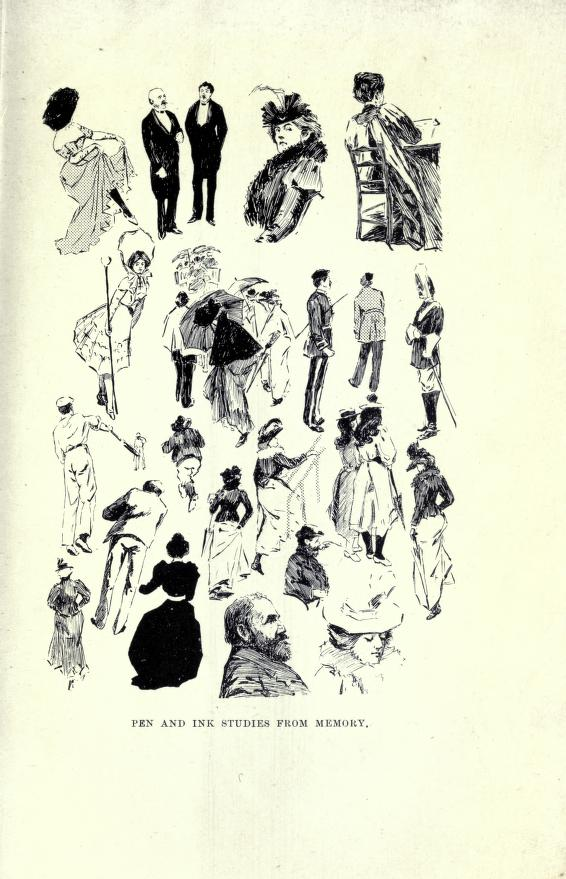
Pen and ink by Yoshio Markino

Markino himself often enjoyed the wet and fog of London street scenes (both popular Japanese motifs) and the paintings of J.M.W. Turner. He would eventually fall for the charms of 'thick fogs'. 'A gaslight shining on a wet pavement in a fog is a miracle of beauty; it is like a pool of molten gold', and with how 'wet pavements reflect everything as if the whole city was built on a lake'. The silk veil technique Markino learned in California was used to present the ebb and flow of the heavy fogs of London from the factories of the Industrial Revolution of multifarious tones and colour, which London residents described as pea-soupers when the air would turn yellow and green and 'stick' to shiny surfaces like window panes.

=== Artistic Hybridisation ===
There was a blending of Japanese and Western techniques in Markino's approach to artistic expression. He would use the plein air technique, or memory (a more common Japanese tradition) to sketching, noting 'I always work work out entirely from the impression I get on the street so that sometimes it looks quite in the Japanese style, and other times quite European ... every day I come back from street study I always draw out all the figures I have seen during the day (from notebook or from memory) ... to make a finished picture I compose all those figures.'

Traditionally in Japanese art, seasons play a large role, and in London winter became Markino's favourite season. He often enjoyed the way snow affected the everyday landscape of the city: 'that house in front of my window is painted in black and yellow. When I came here last summer I laughed at its ugly colour. But now the winter fog covers it, and the harmony of its colour is most wonderful'. 'Then no matter what ugly colours you may make your houses, if they pass through only one winter, the London fogs would so nicely greyly them always!'.

Several of his works are held in the collections of the Museum of London. H. G. Wells on buying Markinos work noted 'I want to carry London to my Paris flat and this picture is the concentrated essence of London.'

== Illustrated works ==
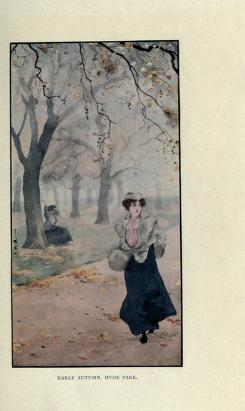
Early Autumn at Hyde Park (1907)

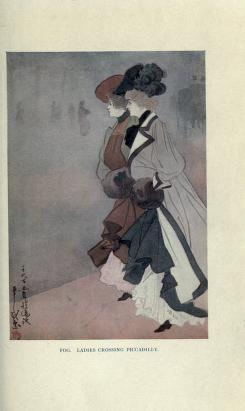
Ladies Crossing Piccadilly (1907)

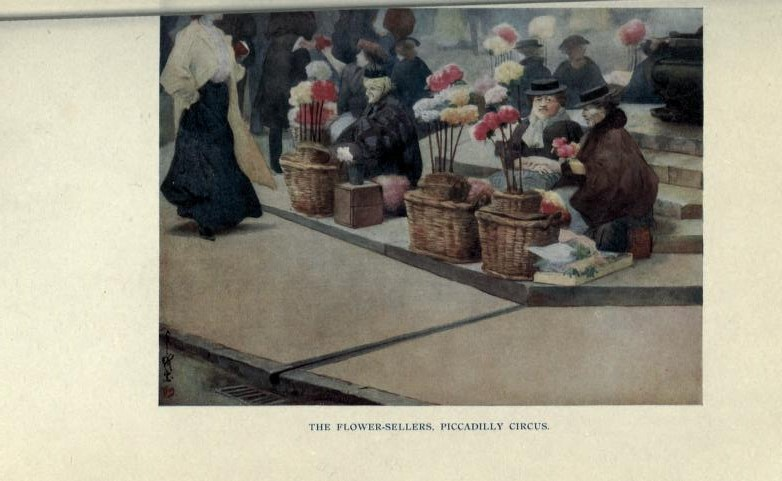
Flower Sellers (1907)

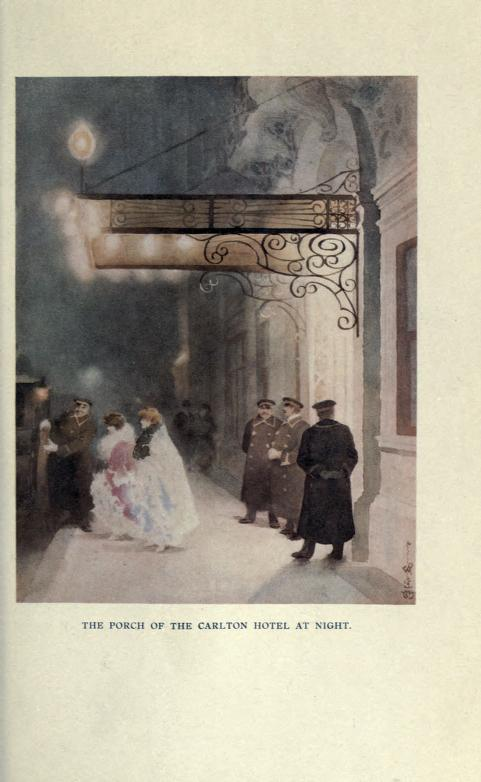
Carlton Hotel at Night (1907)

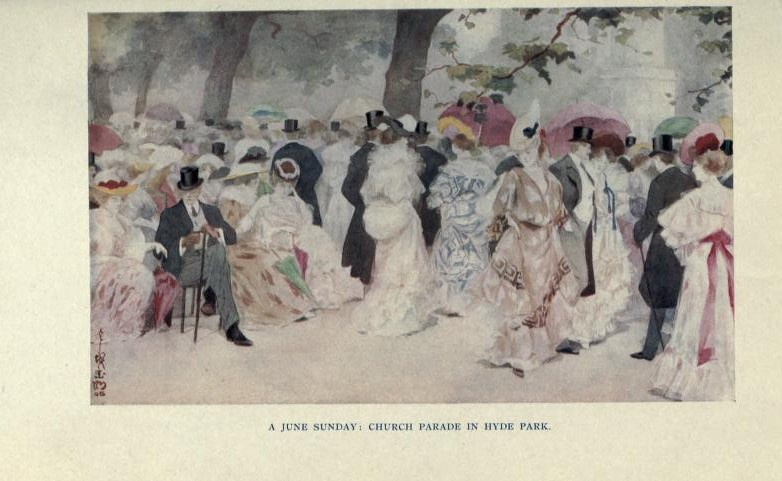
A June Sunday at Hyde Park (1907)

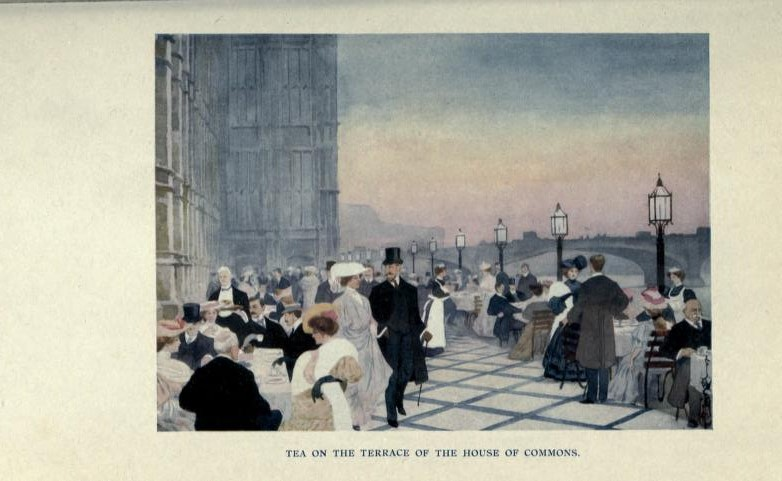
Tea on the terrace on the House of Commons (1907)

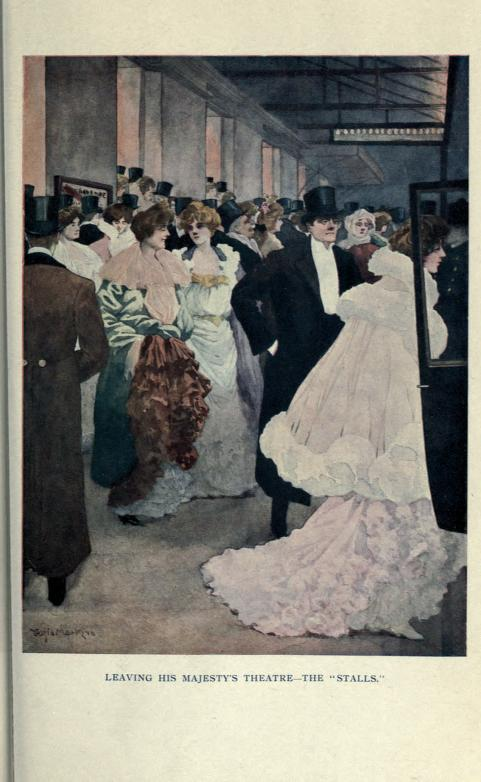
Leaving his Majesty's theatre (1907)

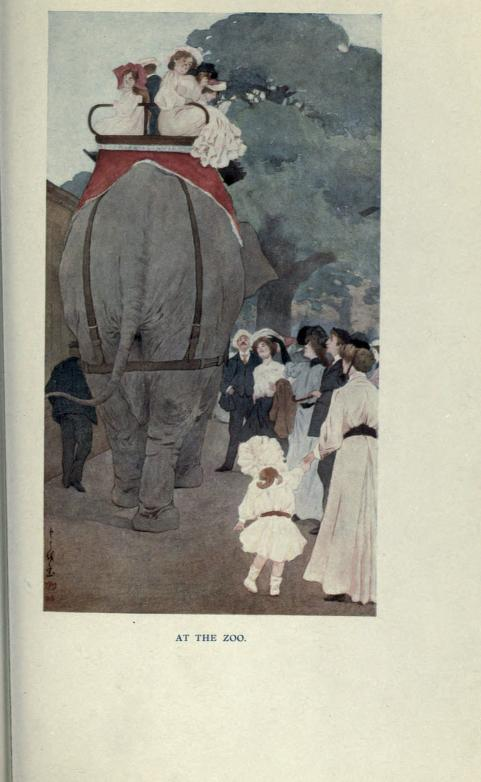
At the Zoo (1907)

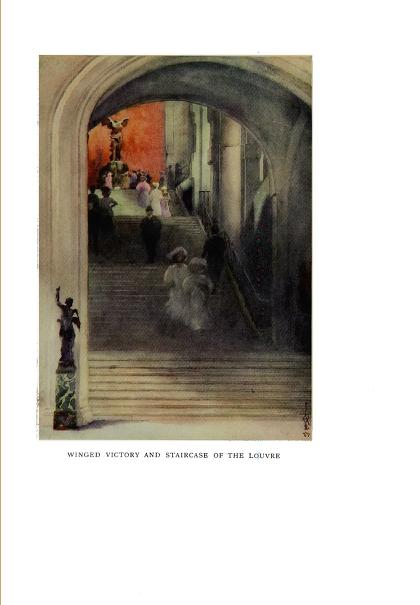
Winged Victory [... of the Louvre (1908)

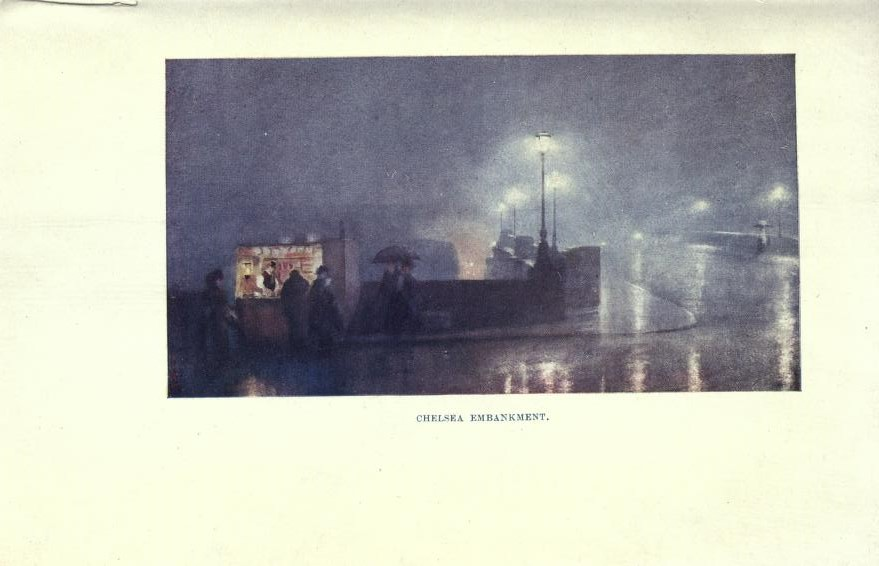
Chelsea Embankment (1910)

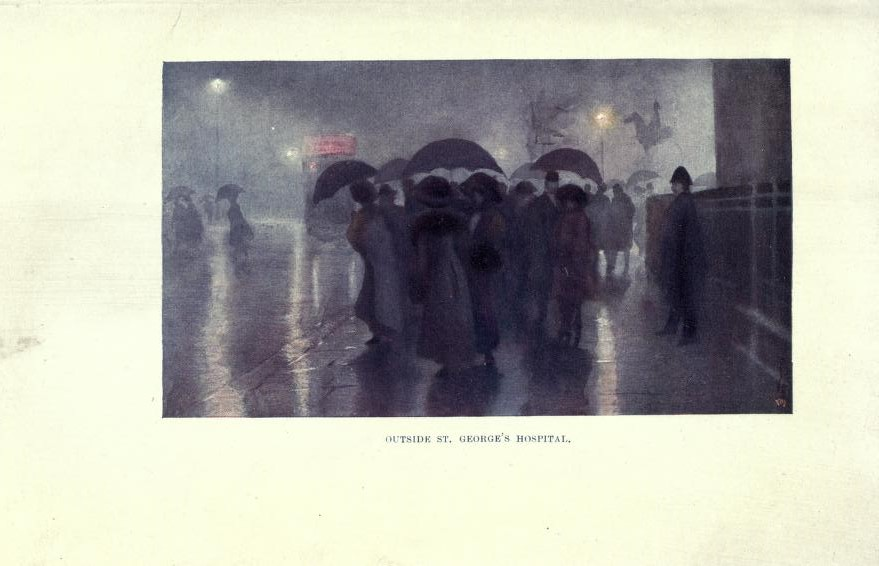
Outside St.Georges Hospital (1910)

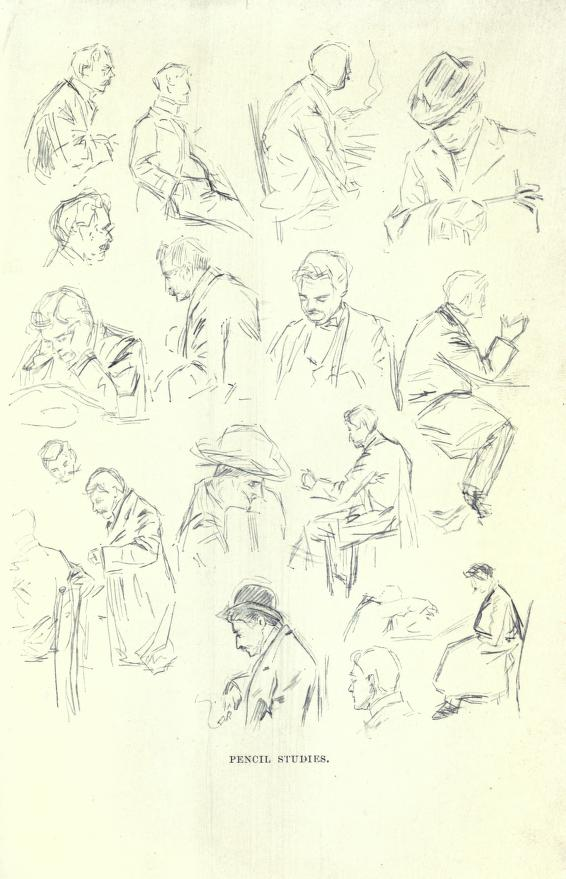
Sketches (1910)

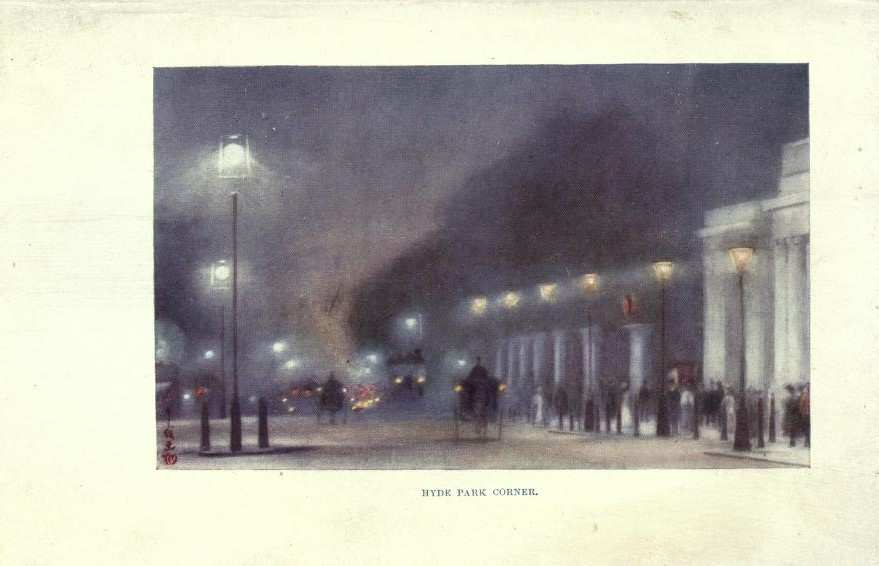
Hyde Park Corner (1910)

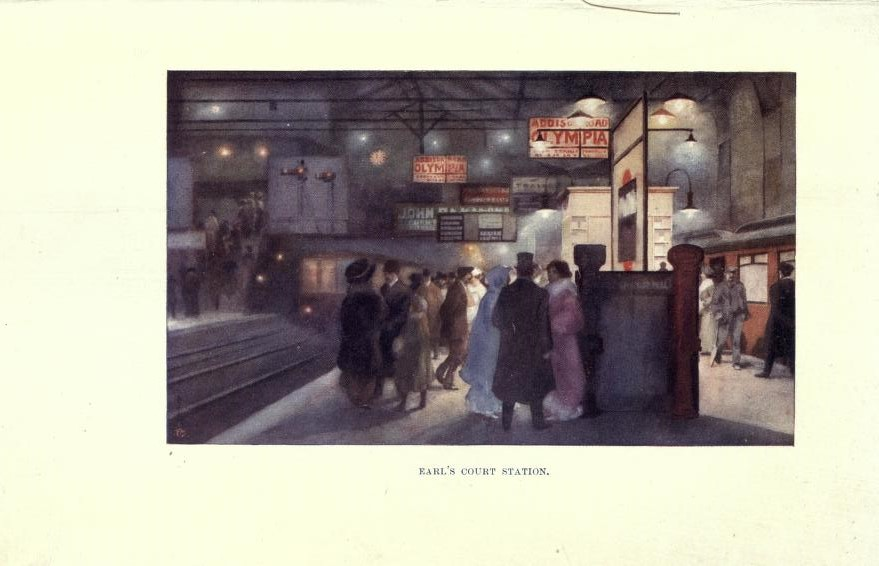
Earls Court Station (1910)

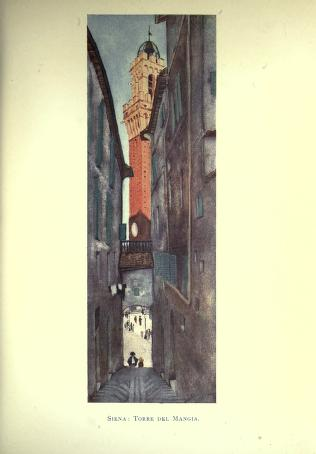
Siena Torre (1911)

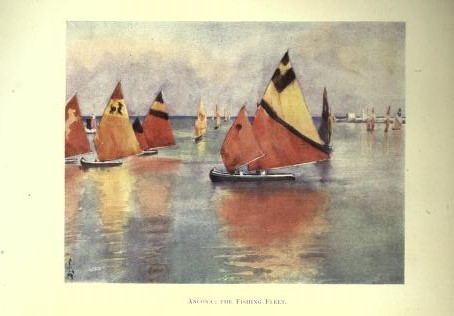
Fishing Fleet (1911)

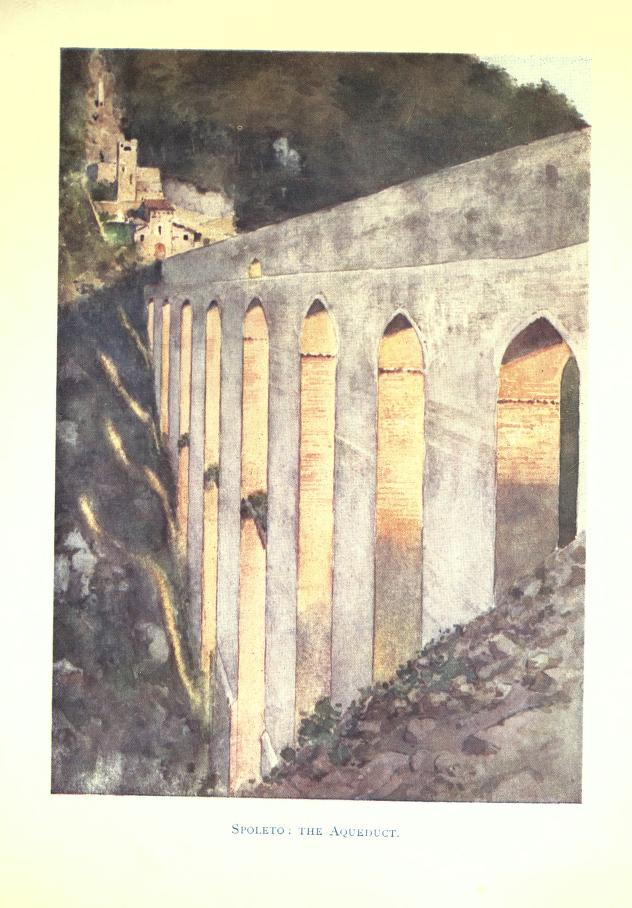
Aqueduct (1911)

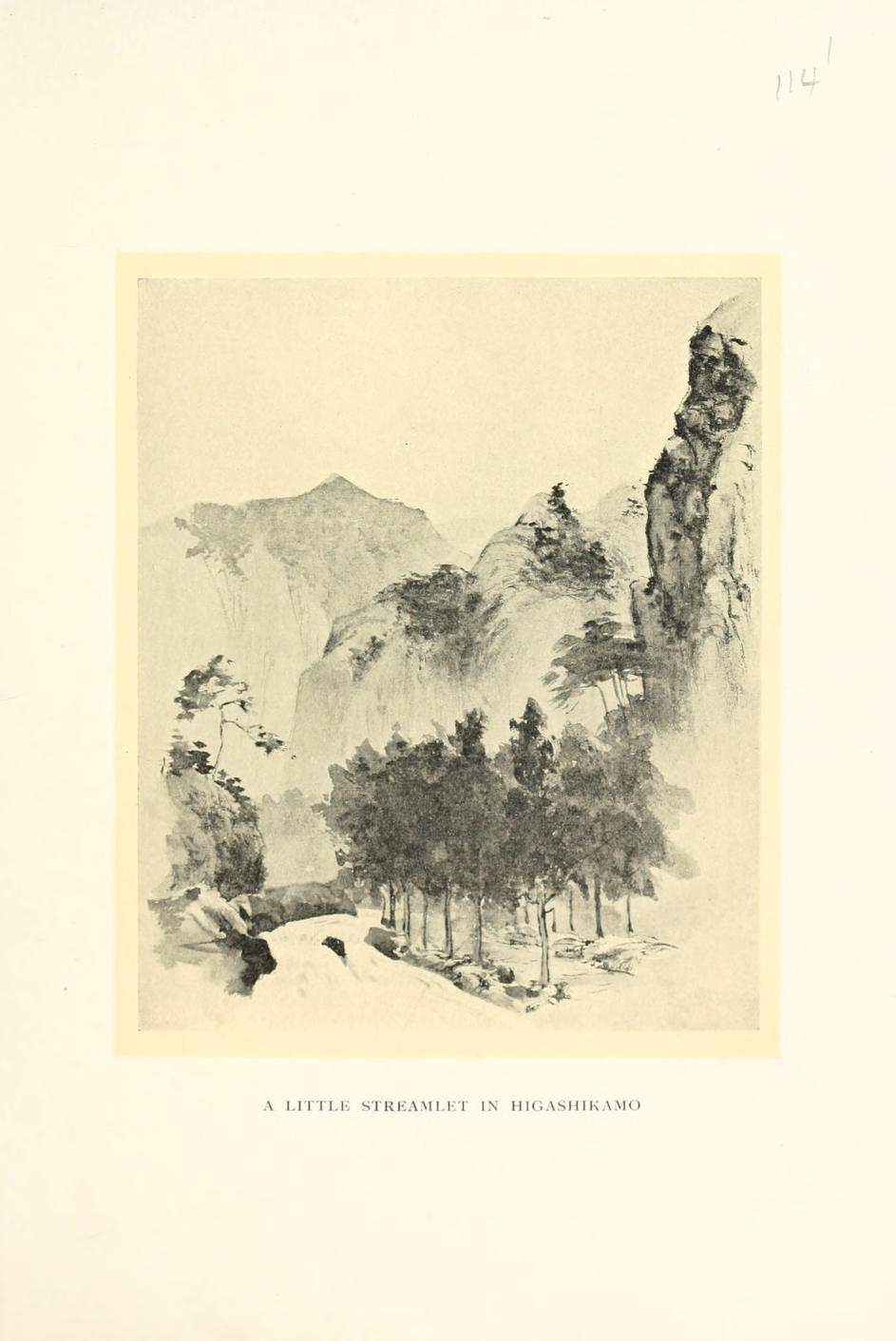
Higashikamo (1912)

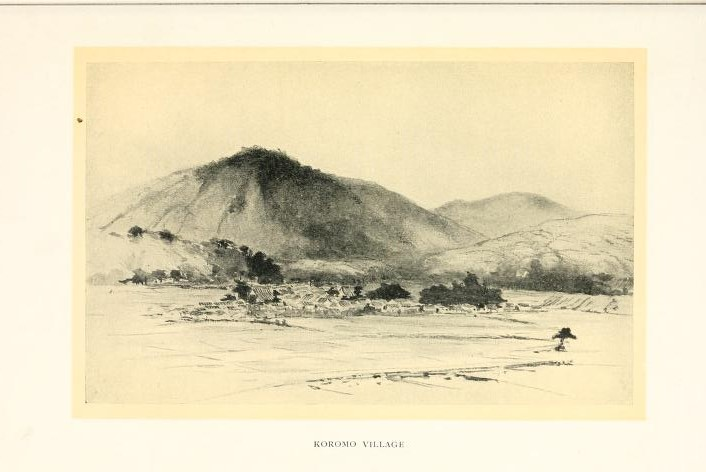
Koromo Village (1912)

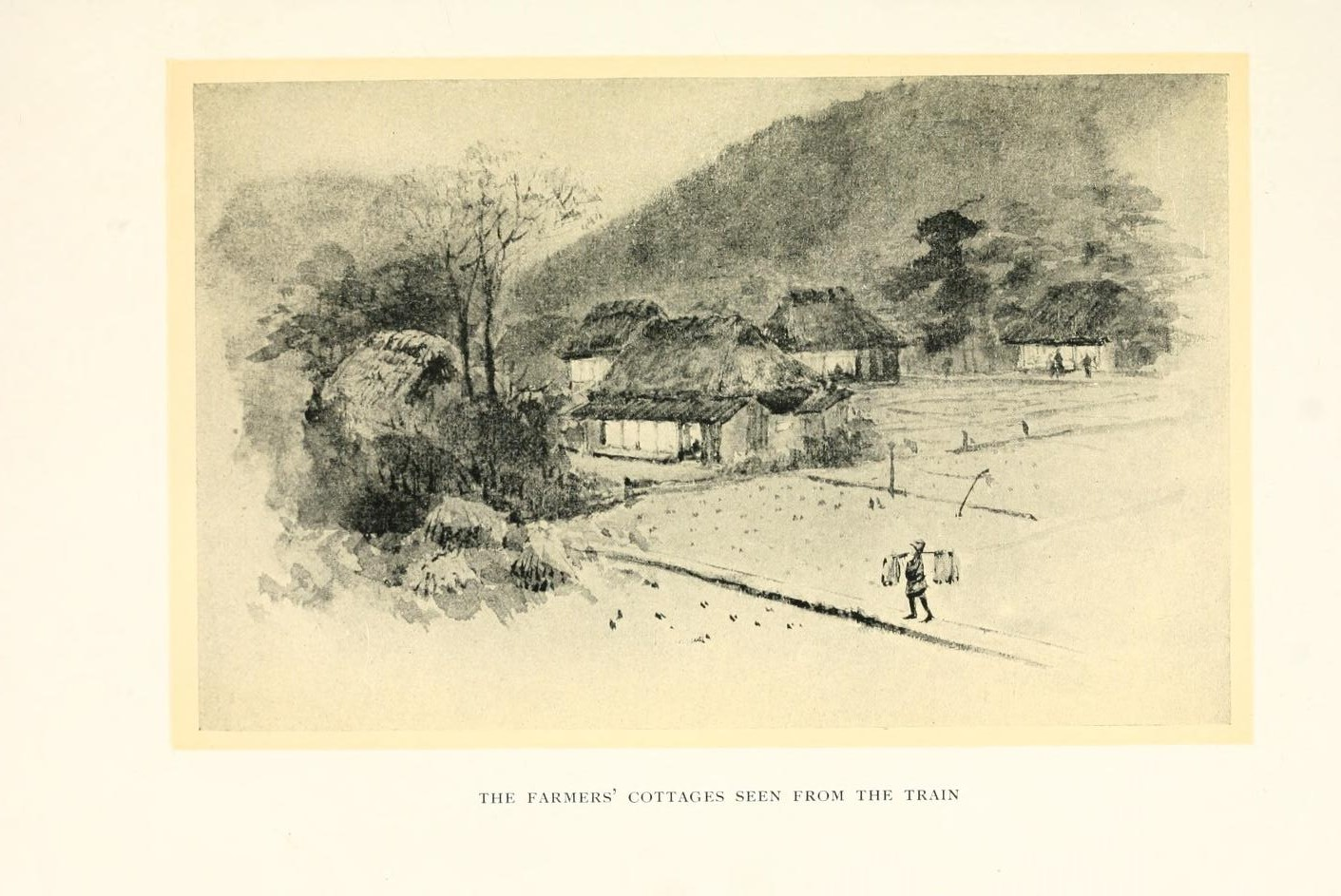
Cottages from the train (1912)

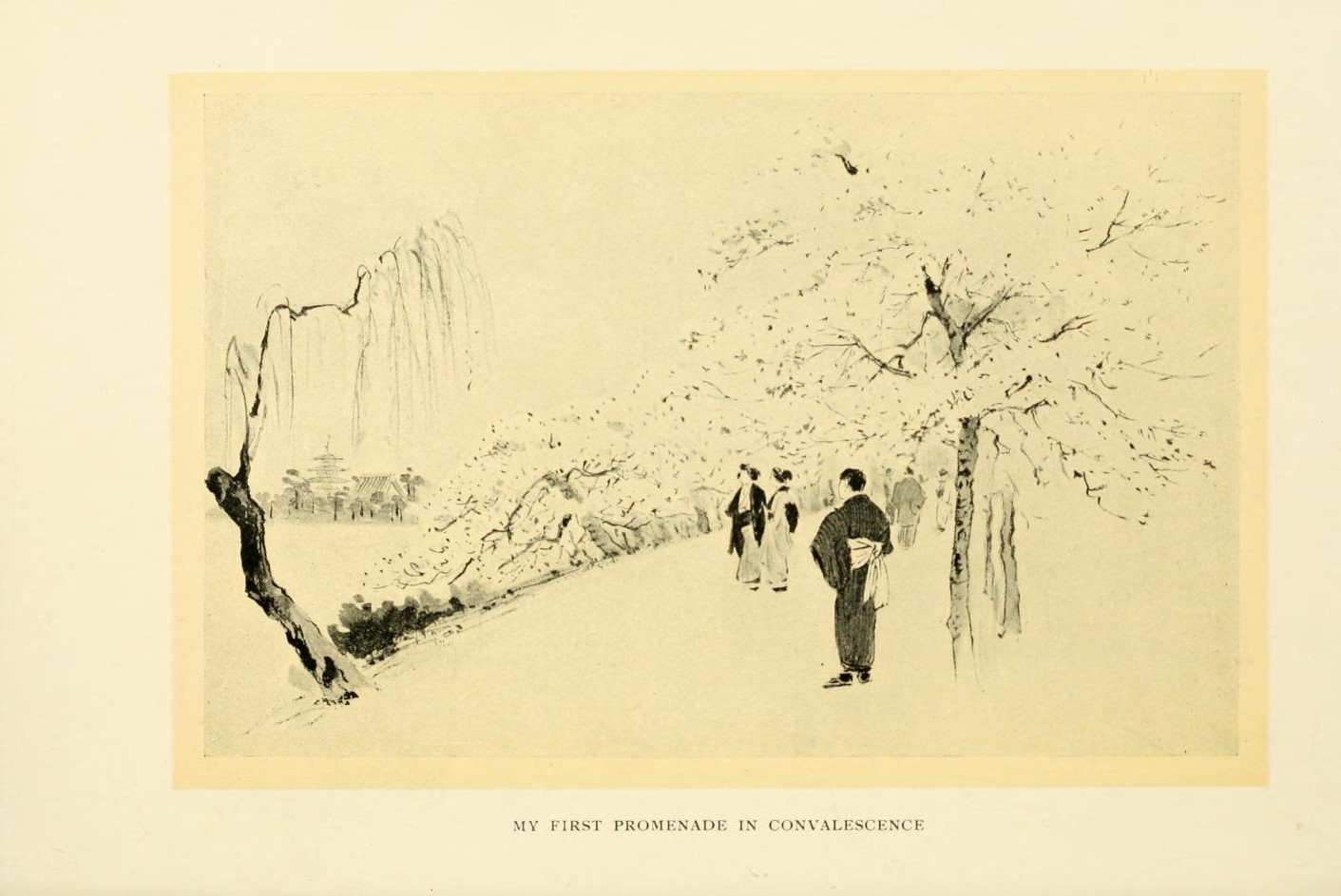
Promenade (1912)

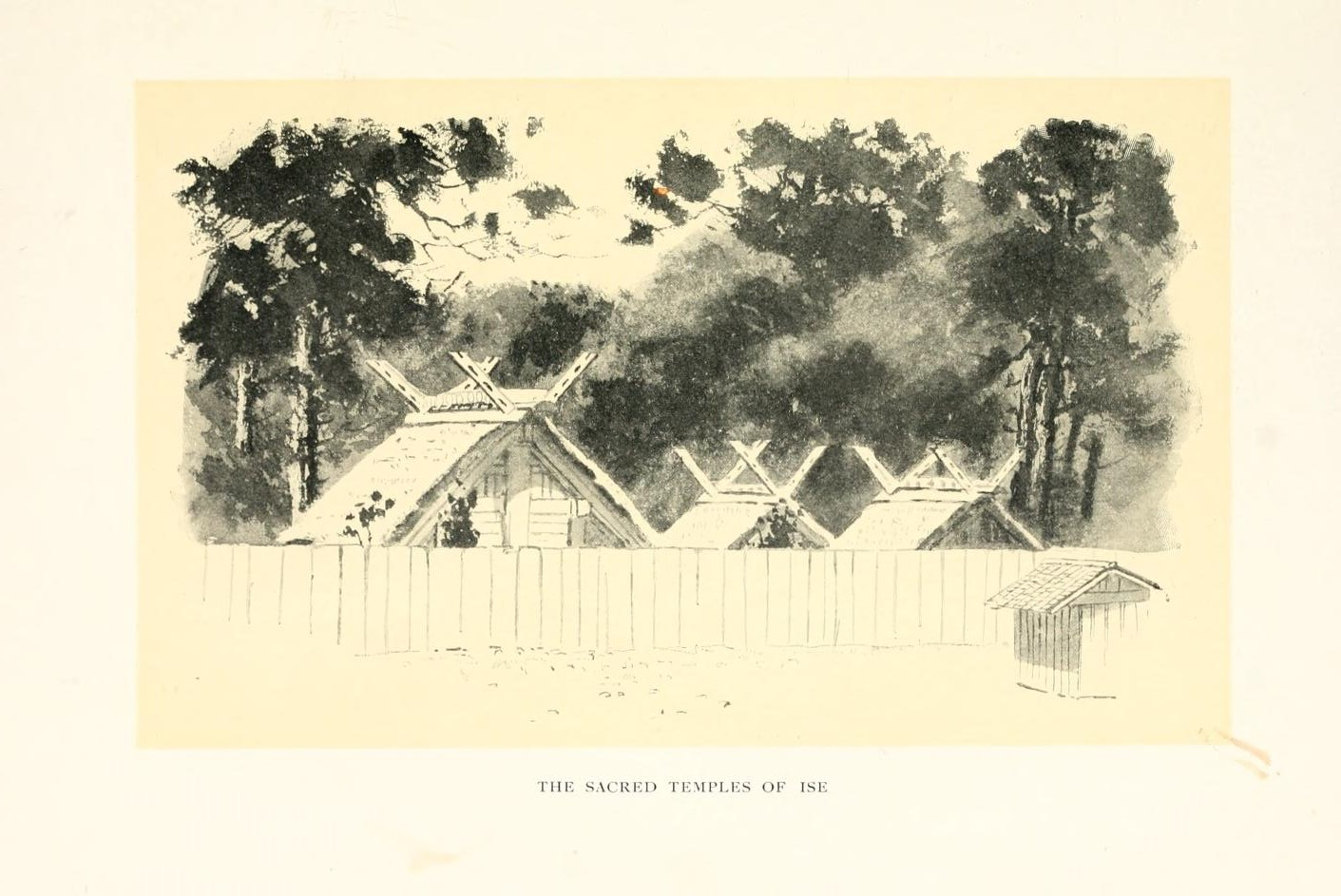
Ise Temple (1912)

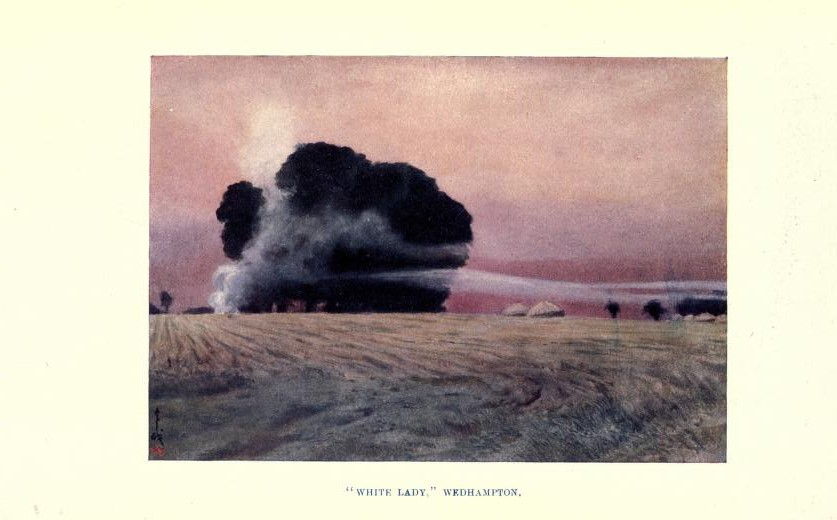
Wedhampton (1912)

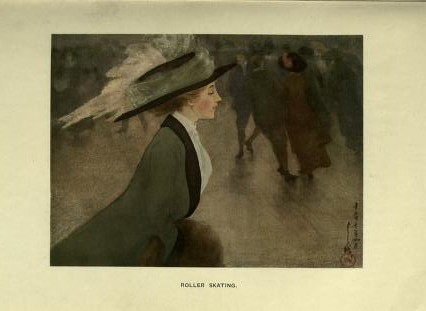
Roller Skating (1912)

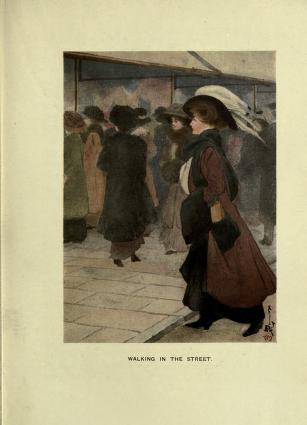
Walking in the street (1912)

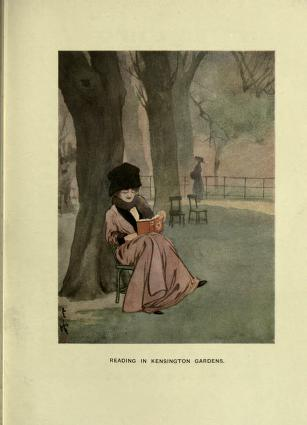
Reading in Kensington Gardens (1912)

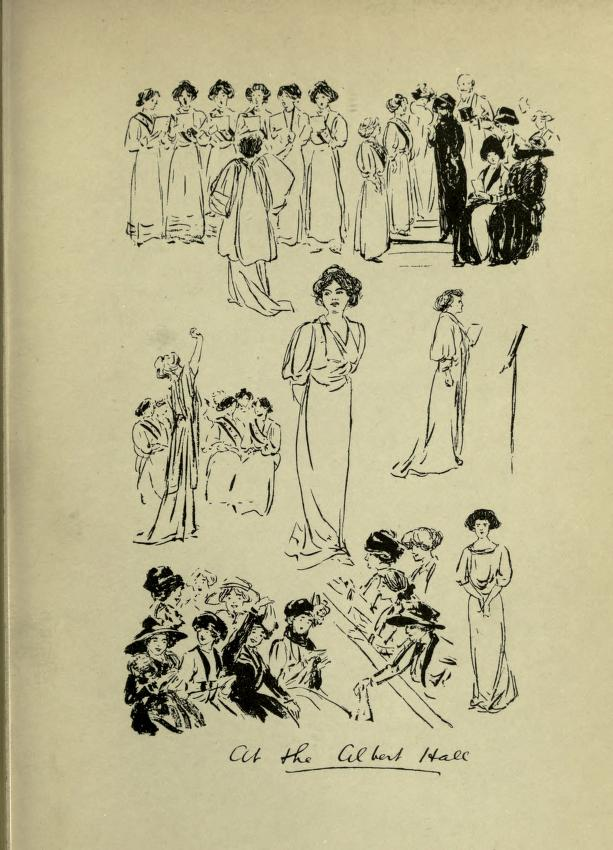
Albert Hall Sketches (1912)

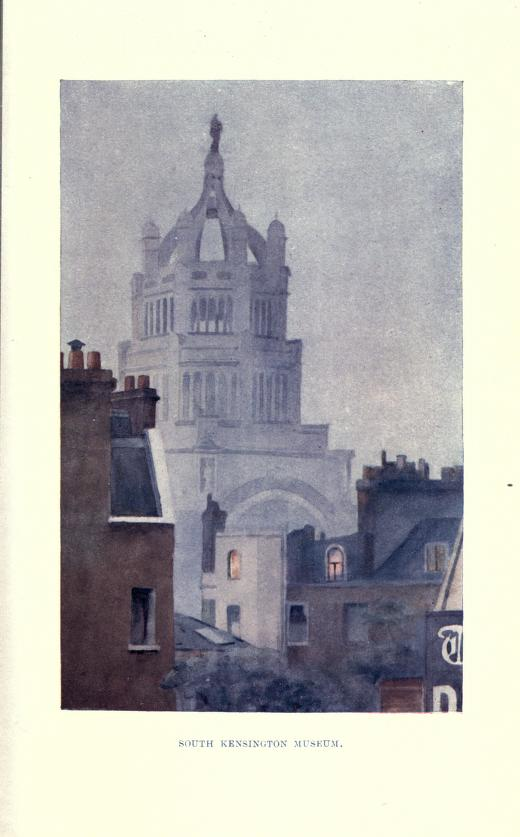
South Kensington Museum (1913)

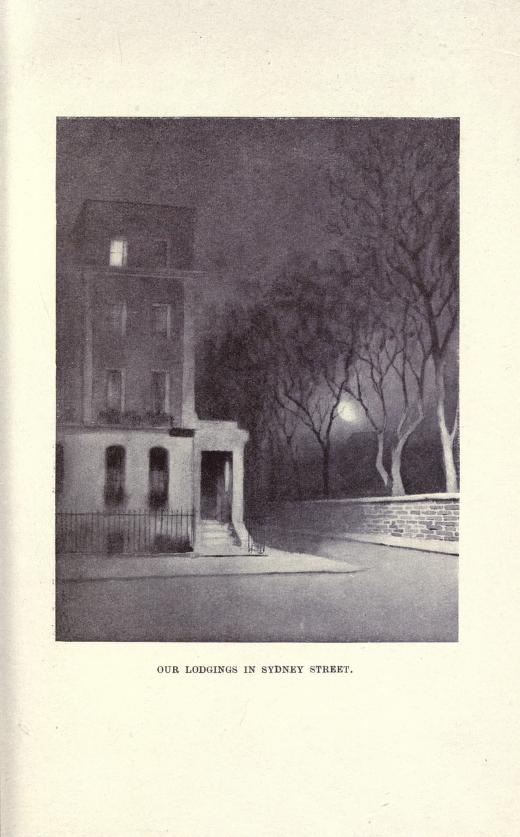
Sydney Street (1913)

== Literary Works ==
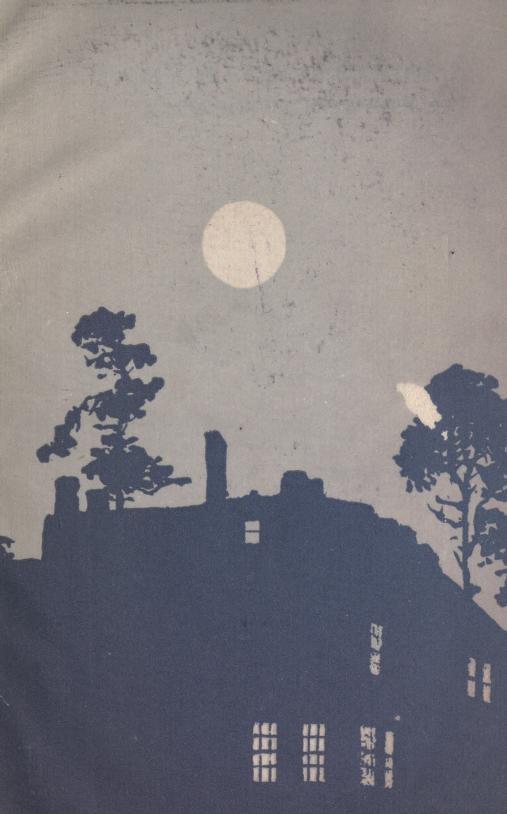
Jacket Design for Recollections and Reflections (1913)

- There was a little man and he had a little gun (1902)
- Japanese Dumpty (1903)
- From the Eastern Sea (1903)
- The Colour of London (1907)
- The Colour of Paris (1908)
- The Colour of Rome (1909)
- A Japanese Artist in London (1910)
- Oxford from Within (1910)
- A Little Pilgrimage in Italy (1911)
- Idealised John Bullesses (1912)
- The Charm of London (1912)
- When I was a child (1912);
- Recollections and Reflections of a Japanese Artist (1913)
- Twenty years of my Life (1913)
- The Story of Yone Noguchi (1914)
- Confucian Discipline (1936)
