= John Stanton Ward =

English painter

John Stanton Ward CBE (10 October 1917 – 13 June 2007) was an English portrait artist, landscape painter and illustrator. His subjects included British royalty and celebrities.

== Life and work ==
Ward was born in Hereford, where his father, Russell Stanton Ward, ran an antiques shop and restored paintings. He was the youngest in a family of seven children, living in a flat above the shop. His father died when he was young. He was educated at St Owen's School in Hereford, and then from 1932 to 1936 at the small Hereford School of Arts and Crafts. With financial support from the Principal, Sir William Rothenstein, he won a place at the Royal College of Art in London in 1936, where he studied under Gilbert Spencer, Barnett Freedman, Percy Horton, Charles Mahoney and Alan Sorrell, winning the prize for drawing.

He served in the Royal Engineers in the Second World War from 1939, and used his drawing skills to design pillboxes in Kent. He was posted to Belgium after the war, where he met his future wife Alison Williams in Ghent. He was demobbed in 1946, and returned to the Royal College of Art for one year, winning its travelling scholarship in 1947.

He drew illustrations for guides to Herefordshire and North Yorkshire. Finding that a Hereford art school colleague was now art editor at Vogue, he obtained commissions to draw illustrations for the magazine from 1948 to 1952. He married Alison in 1950, and moved to Bilting Court - a Tudor house near Ashford, Kent - in 1954.

He taught at Wimbledon School of Art, and his volume of work and income expanded as his reputation and connections grew. He exhibited at Agnew's gallery, and at the Maas Gallery. He drew illustrations for Laurie Lee's Cider with Rosie (1959), H.E. Bates's The Darling Buds of May (1958) and An Autobiography (1969–72) and for Joyce Grenfell's George, Don't Do That (1977). He made illustrations for a number of large companies - BP, Shell, Whitbread - and undertook portraits of royalty, cabinet ministers, city businessmen, and celebrities - Joyce Grenfell, Sir Michael Adeane, Sir Roger Bannister, Lord Denning, Norman Parkinson and Sir Arthur Norrington - and for members of the Society of Dilettanti and of Annabel's. His royal portraits included the Princess of Wales in her wedding dress, the Princess Royal, and the Duchess of Gloucester. He painted the christenings of Prince William and Prince Harry, and also gave drawing lessons to the Prince of Wales. He also made "coloured drawing" (drawings tinted with watercolour) of landscapes. Fifteen of his portraits are held by the National Portrait Gallery.

He became an associate of the Royal Academy in 1956, and a full member in 1966 (he was a Trustee from 1985 to 1993). He and three other members of the Royal Academy resigned in 1997 in protest at the Sensation exhibition. He never rejoined. He was also a member of the Royal Watercolour Society, the Royal Society of Portrait Painters (Vice-President from 1980 to 1985) and the New English Art Club. He received an honorary doctorate from University of Kent in 1982, and was appointed CBE in 1985.

Ward's work was exhibited in Tenterden in 1989, jointly with Ernest Greenwood and Ken Howard.

He died in Bilting, Kent, and was survived by his wife, their four sons and two daughters. His daughter, Celia Ward, is also a painter, as is his son Toby.
