= Ken Howard (artist) =

British painter (1932–2022)

Sarah Blue and Orange '04 by Ken Howard. Oil on canvas, 61 × 50.8 cm

James Kenneth Howard OBE RA (26 December 1932 – 11 September 2022) was a British artist and painter. He was President of the New English Art Club from 1998 to 2003.

== Life and art ==
James Kenneth Howard was born in Cricklewood, London on 26 December 1932. After attending Kilburn Grammar School, he studied at the Hornsey College of Art (1949–53) and the Royal College of Art (1955–58). In 1958 he won a British Council Scholarship to Florence. He spent his National Service in the Royal Marines (1953–55). In 1973 and 1978 he was the Official War Artist to Northern Ireland, and 1973–80 worked in various locations, including Hong Kong, Cyprus and Canada with the British Army. In 1983 he was elected an Associate of the Royal Academy (ARA). In 1998 he became President of the New English Art Club, a post he held until 2003. In 1991 he was elected a Royal Academician (RA).

Howard painted in a "traditional" manner, based on strong observation and a high degree of draughtsmanship combined with tonal precision. The depiction of light is a strong and recurrent element of his work. A notable theme is the nude model in his studio. Another theme is a city scene, such as Venice, with emphasis placed on the reflection of light from puddles after rain. He has said:

I was brought up in London surrounded by railway yards and factories. This has very much influenced the use of horizontal and vertical structures and lines in my work. I am not a landscape painter, but rather a vertical horizontal and linear painter, which is why I have a passion for the lines that occur within my studios, and include them in my paintings. When I study a model, I think of that figure not in rhythmical terms, but in vertical or horizontal positions and planes.

His work is in public collections including the National Army Museum, Guildhall Art Gallery, Ulster Museum and Imperial War Museum. In 1989 his work was exhibited in Tenterden jointly with Ernest Greenwood and John Stanton Ward.

Howard was appointed Officer of the Order of the British Empire (OBE) in the 2010 Birthday Honours. He died from complications of a fall at the Royal Cornwall Hospital in Truro, Cornwall, on 11 September 2022, aged 89.

== Prizes ==
Howard has won various prizes including:

- 1996 Lord Mayor’s Art Award (first prize)
- 1978 John Moores Exhibition in Liverpool
- 1979 John Laing Competition
- 1982 Hunting Group Awards (first prize)
- 1983 RWA
- 1985 Critics Prize at Sparkasse Karlsruhe
- 1986 NEAC Centenary Award
- 2001 NEAC Critics Prize

== Associations ==
(with date of election)

- New English Art Club (1962)
- Royal Institute of Oil Painters (1966)
- Royal Society of Painters in Watercolours (1979)
- Royal West of England Academy (1981)
- Royal Society of British Artists Honorary Member (1988)
- Royal Academy Royal Academician (1991)
- New English Art Club President (1998)

== Books ==
- Ken Howard by Ken Howard (2002) published by Thames & Hudson, ISBN 1-903973-08-2.
- A Vision of Venice in Watercolour by Ken Howard and Michael Leitch (2002) published by Harry S Abrams, Inc., ISBN 0-8109-6650-6.
- A Personal View : Inspired by Light by Ken Howard and Sally Bulgin (1998) published by David & Charles, ISBN 0-7153-0841-6
- Art Class by Ken Howard (1999) published by Quadrillon, ISBN 1-84100-161-9
- Light and Dark: The Autobiography of Ken Howard (2011) published by Royal Academy of Arts, ISBN 9781905711895
- Ken Howard's Switzerland, In the Footsteps of Turner by Ken Howard (2013) published by Royal Academy of Art, ISBN 1-907533-39-7

== DVDs ==
- The Way I See It a documentary on the life and work of Professor Ken Howard OBE RA by Dave Austin & Neale Worley. Independent production. www.nealeworley.com/kenhowarddvd

== See also ==
- New English Art Club
- Royal Academy
- Royal West of England Academy
- William Bowyer
