= Croydon College =

College in London, England

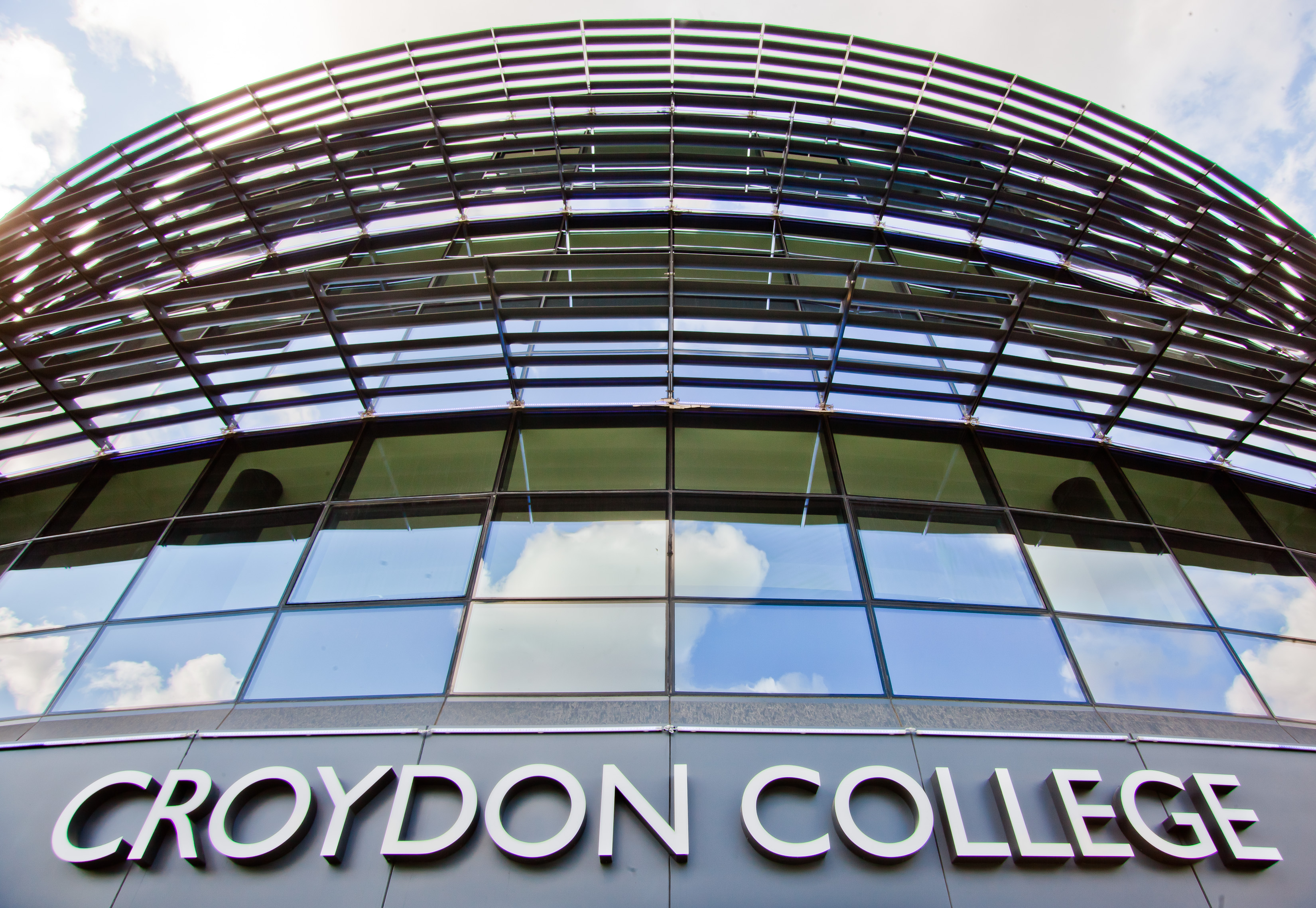

Location
- College Road; Croydon, CR9 1DX; England; 51°22′25″N 0°05′42″W

Information
- Type: Further education and higher education
- Established: 1868–1888 – founding institutions 1955 – Croydon Technical College
- Local authority: London Borough of Croydon
- Department for Education URN: 130432 Tables
- Ofsted: Reports
- Principal: Caireen Mitchell
- Gender: Mixed
- Age: 14+
- Enrolment: 10,000+
- Website: croydon.ac.uk

Croydon College is a large further and higher education college located in Croydon, within the London Borough of Croydon. Its origins can be traced to a School of Art that was established in 1868, which subsequently merged with Croydon Polytechnic to create the college shortly after the Second World War. The college provides study programmes, apprenticeships and higher education courses at Croydon University Centre to over 10,000 enrolled students as of 2014, of which 3,400 are full-time. The college is the only Further Education College to have been awarded the Queen's Award for Voluntary Service (QAVS).

== History ==
The history of the college is directly linked to that of two institutions, the Croydon College of Art and the Croydon Polytechnic.

Croydon Corporation (the governing body of the County Borough of Croydon) founded the Pitlake Technical Institute in 1888, which would later become Croydon Polytechnic, which had an initial intake of 162 students. Twenty years earlier in 1868, the School of Art had been founded above the Public Halls in George Street. In 1929, the Board of Education first highlighted the need for a new technical college to replace Croydon Polytechnic.

In 1932, the School of Art was taken over by the council to become Croydon College of Art. In 1941, the Polytechnic school was gutted by fire. It was not until 1948 before the plans for a new college could be revived when the corporation drew up a Development Plan for Further Education. By then student enrolment had risen to over 4,000. The plan was to create a technical college, which would merge the Polytechnic and College of Art. Three years later, Croydon Corporation formally approved plans for a new college and in 1953 construction started at the college's current Fairfield site on the first of four stages. It opened as Croydon Technical College in 1955, renamed to Croydon Technical College by 1974.

In June 1968, there was a six-day student protest that included Robin Scott, Malcolm McLaren, and Jamie Reid (all students at the time).

Recent Principals have included Peter Phillips (until 1994), Vic Seddon (1995–2001) and Mariane Cavalli (2001 to 2010). It was Vic Seddon who created the Croydon Higher Education Centre, developed by Mariane Cavalli, which is the focus for university degree and research activity in the town of Croydon. A proposal to create the formalised Croydon University College in the Millennium year 1999–2000 was rejected by both the Higher Education Funding Council for England and Croydon Borough Council, however In November 2011, the college was given approval to use the title University Centre Croydon (UCC). Caireen Mitchell will take up the post of CEO and principal in April 2018.

=== Honours ===
In 2013 Croydon College was the first predominantly further education institution to be awarded UNICEF's Rights Respecting Schools Award accreditation, the highest accolade awarded by UNICEF UK.

In 2014 the college was awarded the Queen's Award for Voluntary Service (QAVS).

It is currently graded "good" by Ofsted (2014).

== Campus ==
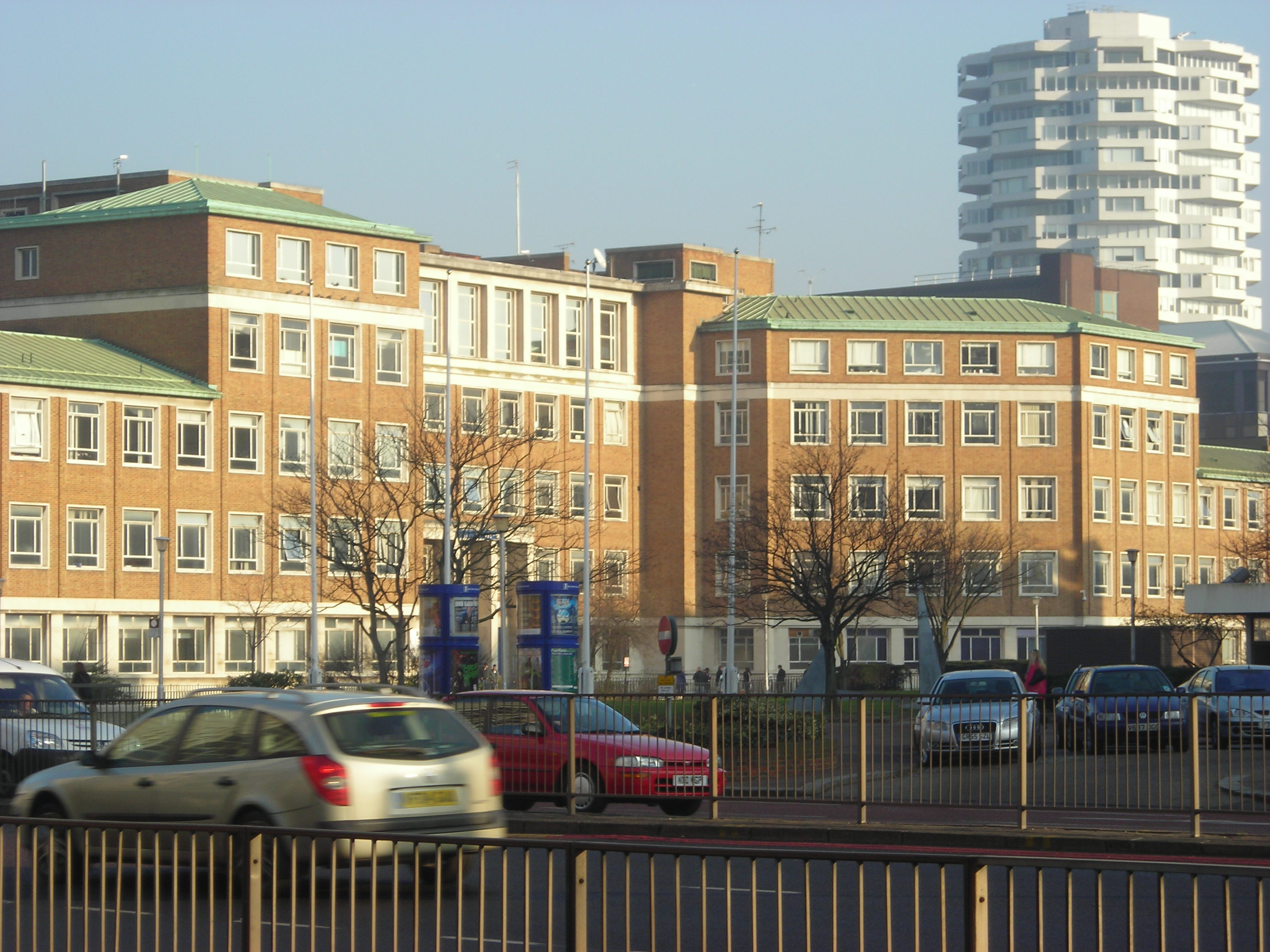
Croydon College buildings

Croydon College underwent refurbishment and in the summer of 2011 the £33m rotunda was completed and officially opened in April 2012 by the Mayor of London, Boris Johnson. The refurbishment included recording studios, a performance hall, a library, social and study spaces, and meeting and conference facilities. As part of the refurbishment IQ Projects designed and installed a curved structural glass wall in the space between the library and the multi-leveled atrium as well as frameless glass balustrades with stainless steel handrails to access stairs between floors. The exterior of the college is made from a structural glass facade with top hung windows incorporated to provide ventilation.

== Academic organisation ==
=== Further education ===
Croydon College offers vocation qualifications such at BTEC Diplomas, NVQs and Entry Level courses. It also offers Apprenticeships and complementary enrichment activities.

=== Higher education ===
In November 2011, the college was given approval to use the title University Centre Croydon. In 2020, it re-branded Higher Education to Croydon University Centre. CUC offers degrees, HNC's and other Higher Education courses. The degree courses are validated by Roehampton University.

In 2020, a Nursing Suite was built for the Adult Nursing degree starting in September 2020.

=== Croydon School of Art ===
The Croydon School of Art was relaunched in 2013 by fashion designer and alumnus of the art school, John Rocha. Established in 1868, it was known at one time as one of the leading art schools in the country. The school counts among its alumni pop star David Bowie, Turner Prize nominees Helen Chadwick and Sean Scully, Sex Pistols band manager Malcolm McLaren, Gollywog author Florence Upton, and Mighty Boosh comedian Noel Fielding. Some of the art school's traditional screen printing, etching, and letterpress equipment has been retained in its refurbished facilities.

== Future ==
There have been plans to redevelop the area around Croydon College. These have been part of Croydon Vision 2020 and have also featured in the Croydon Plan and Croydon Expo. It includes plans to provide a pedestrian link between East Croydon station and the Fairfield College site. The north east corner of the area around the college site is an integral part of this pedestrian movement route.

== Notable alumni ==
- Abiola Aderibigbe, British-Nigerian lawyer
- Marie Angel, artist and illustrator
- Humza Arshad (born 1985), actor, comedian and writer
- Irene Bache, artist and teacher
- Becca, Ghanaian singer-songwriter
- Iris Brooke, artist and author
- Irene Mary Browne (1881–1977), artist
- Edith Carr, artist
- Helen Chadwick, artist
- Ray Davies, rock musician, lead singer of The Kinks
- Lucienne Day, textile designer
- FKA twigs, singer-songwriter, producer, dancer
- Noel Fielding, co-writer and star of The Mighty Boosh
- Stuart Humphryes, film colouriser & photo enhancer (enrolled 1986–1988)
- Mary Koop (1884–1967), poster artist
- Malcolm McLaren, impresario, manager of the Sex Pistols
- Robert Micklewright (1923–2013), artist and illustrator
- Juan Muñoz, sculptor
- Mervyn Peake, writer and poet who wrote the Gormenghast books
- Jamie Reid, anarchist with connections to Situationist International
- John Rocha, fashion designer
- Gareth Southgate, England national team manager, England international footballer, Premiership manager and TV pundit
- Jonathan Wolstenholme (born 1950), British artist and illustrator

== See also ==
- Education in England
