= Ivy Evelyn Woodward =

British physician

Ivy Evelyn Haslam MD MRCP
- Born: Ivy Evelyn Woodward; 30 May 1877; Foots Cray, Kent, England, UK
- Died: 11 January 1957 (aged 79); London, England, UK
- Education: London School of Medicine for Women
- Known for: First woman member of Royal College of Physicians
- Medical career
- Profession: Physician
- Field: Pathology & Paediatrics
- Institutions: Royal Free Hospital

Ivy Evelyn Haslam M.D. MRCP (née Woodward; 30 May 1877–11 January 1957) was a British medical practitioner. In 1909, she became the first female member of the Royal College of Physicians (RCP).

Born in Kent, the eldest of six children, Woodward was educated in Bromley before studying medicine at the London School of Medicine for Women. After gaining her membership in the RCP in 1909, she continued posts at the Royal Free Hospital, including assistant pathologist. In 1915, she became a Fellow of the Royal Society of Medicine. Her last known appointment was as a clinical assistant, Children’s Outpatient Department, West London Hospital.

Woodward married surgeon Arthur Charles Haslam and they had five children. In 2018, she was featured in the RCP exhibition "This Vexed Question: 500 years of women in medicine".

== Early life and education ==
Ivy Evelyn Woodward was born on 30 May 1877 in Foots Cray, Kent. Her parents were Elizabeth Woodward (née Addis) (1854–1932), born in Plymouth, Devon, and Harry Woodward (1848–1901), a solicitor from March, Cambridgeshire. She was the eldest of six children, with sisters, Dorothy May, Marjory, and Cicely Ravenscroft, and brothers, Henry and Harry, all born between 1878 and 1886.

She passed the matriculation examination of the University of London in January 1895 and went on to pass the Intermediate Examination in Arts in 1896, with third class honours in French, while still at Bromley High School. She registered with the General Medical Council as a medical student on 13 May 1897, having started her studies at the London School of Medicine for Women on 3 May 1897. She passed her Intermediate Science and Preliminary Science examination in 1898 from Bedford and University Colleges and went on to gain her Intermediate Medicine qualification in July 1900. She passed her M.B. in 1903, B.S. in 1904, and gained her M.D. (London) in 1908, alongside Dorothy Christian Hare (1876–1967). She obtained the London University M.D. Gold Medal, still awarded for the best performance by a final-year medical student.

== Medical career ==
Woodward was admitted as the first woman member of the Royal College of Physicians in July 1909.

In 1905, she was listed in the Medical Directory as a house physician at the Royal Free Hospital, while living at 12 West Cromwell Road, London. In 1910, she was listed in the Medical Directory as a medical registrar at Royal Free Hospital, having previously been its museum curator, demonstrator in morbid histology, clinical assistant, and assistant clinical pathologist. She also worked in this period as a clinical assistant, then senior clinical assistant in the Children’s Department at the New Hospital for Women, assistant school medical officer for London County Council and medical examiner for Kensington High School and Notting Hill High School. Her recent posts also included clinical assistant at the Royal Hospital of Diseases of the Chest, and senior and junior resident medical officer at the Belgrave Hospital for Children.

Her entry in the Medical Directory in 1915 lists her as a Fellow of the Royal Society of Medicine, and a Member of the Association of Registered Medical Women (later the Medical Women's Federation). In addition to her previous roles at the Royal Free Hospital, earlier posts as a joint pathologist at the New Hospital for Women and honorary pathologist at Warneford Hospital, Leamington are included.

In 1930, she was listed as a house physician at the Royal Free Hospital, and resident medical officer at the Belgrave Hospital for Children. By 1935, she was a medical officer for Cambridge House and Southfields Infant Welfare Centres, and a local medical inspector at Wycombe High School. In 1940, she was listed in the Medical Directory as a clinical assistant, Children’s Outpatient Department, West London Hospital.

== Personal life ==
In 1910, she married surgeon Arthur Charles Haslam, FRCS(Eng) (1873–15 March 1927) in Kensington, London. After their marriage, they lived in Bromley, Kent. They had five children: Richard Frederick (29 June 1912–March 1990), George Melvill (18 June 1914–1962, later founder of the Television & Film Design Department at the Royal College of Art), Margaret Elizabeth (1916–2000), Katharine Alice (5 June 1918–1984), and Ruth Marion (1920–2007). After being widowed in 1927, Ivy Haslam moved to Gerrards Cross. In the 1939 National Register, she is recorded as living with her son Richard, daughter-in-law Cathleen (née Darlow, an artist), and daughter Katherine in Eton, Buckinghamshire. Later from 1948 until her death, she lived in Redcliffe Road in Chelsea with daughters Katharine and Ruth, with Richard and Cathleen (known as Biddy) living around the corner in Cathcart Road.

== Death and legacy ==
Woodward died on 11 January 1957 in St. Stephen's Hospital, London, aged 79.

In 2018, she was featured, along with the first female member of the Royal College of Surgeons, Dossibai Patell, in the exhibition, "This Vexed Question: 500 years of women in medicine", an exhibition held at the Royal College of Physicians Museum from September 2018 to January 2019.

== References and sources ==
Sources

- Censuses: 1881, 1891, 1901, 1911
- Medical Directories: 1910–1940
- London University Student Records, 1901
