= M. K. Krishna Menon =

Indian gynecologist and obstetrician

M.K. Krishna Menon was a leading Indian gynecologist and obstetrician who was among the first to introduce an effective treatment for the state of eclampsia in pregnancy. His lytic cocktail was the popular mode of eclampsia management until it was superseded by more sophisticated regimes. He was a recipient of the Padma Shri, the fourth highest Indian civilian award.
