= Girton High School =

Girton

Location
- 20-E, Wimbridge Compound, Naushir Bharucha Marg; Mumbai, Maharashtra, 400007; India

Information
- Type: Private school
- Established: 1888; 138 years ago
- Principal: Mrs. Zeeya Kapadia
- Grades: Elementary and 1–10
- Gender: Girls
- Houses: Jupiter; Mars; Neptune; Venus
- Colour: Green
- Website: www.girtonhighschool.com

Girton High School is a private school for girls in Mumbai, Maharashtra, India. It was established in 1888.

== Foundation ==
The school was established in 1888 by Bachoobai A. Moos (1850-1946), the sister of Bombay Observatory director Nanabhai Moos. (Note: The first Parsi woman to set up a school, she is regarded as representative of the Parsis' notable achievements in advancing their community in the academic sphere, particularly in the education of women.)

== Notable alumni ==
- Gulestan Rustom Billimoria, philanthropist, social worker, writer and painter.
- Dossibai Patell (1881-1960), obstetrician and gynaeologist.
