= Dossibai Patell =

Indian obstetrician and gynaecologist

Dossibai Patell MBE, MD, MRCP
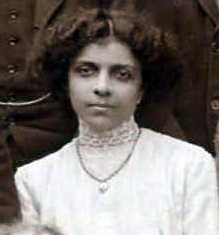
- Dossibai Patell, c. 1912.
- Born: Dossibai Rustomji Cowasji Patell; 16 October 1881; Navsara Chambers, Fort Bombay
- Died: 4 February 1960 (aged 78)
- Education: Grant Medical College
- Known for: First woman to become Member of the RCS in 1910
- Medical career
- Profession: Physician
- Sub-specialties: Obstetrics and gynaecology

Dossibai Rustomji Cowasji Patell MBE, MRCP (16 October 1881 – 4 February 1960), later known as Dossibai Jehangir Ratenshaw Dadabhoy, was an Indian obstetrician and gynaecologist, who in 1910 became the first woman to become a member of the Royal College of Surgeons of England (RCS).

After completing initial medical training in India, she spent six years in London studying for the MRCS (Eng), LRCP, MRCP, MB BS and finally MD.

Upon return to India, she established a career in obstetrics and gynaecology, advocated maternal and child welfare centres and petitioned for reducing infant mortality. In this role, she became active in a variety of societies, becoming the president of first the Bombay Obstetric and Gynaecological Society and later of the Association of Medical Women in India.

The Dossibai J. R. Dadabhoy oration is given in her memory.

== Early life ==
Dossibai Patell was born on 16 October 1881 to a wealthy Parsi family and attended Miss Moos School for Girls in Bombay (now Mumbai).

Patell came from Navsari Chambers, Fort Bombay, India. In 1903, she completed her medical training at Grant Medical College, Bombay, from where she gained her Licentiate in Medicine and Surgery. She then assisted Sir Temulji Nariman and Dr. Masina in Bombay before persuading her parents to allow her to study abroad.

== Life in London ==
Patell spent four years studying at the Royal Free Hospital (London School of Medicine for Women) and in May 1910, became the first woman to become a member (MRCS) of the Royal College of Surgeons, four years after women were allowed to sit the MRCS exam. In the same year she became the first woman licentiate (LRCP) of the Royal College of Physicians (RCP). She also became a Bachelor of Medicine and Bachelor of Surgery (MB BS) of the University of London in 1910. In 1911 she became a member of the RCP, three years after women were permitted to sit its exam and one year after Ivy Evelyn Woodward became the first woman member of the college.

She completed her Doctor of Medicine degree (MD) at the London School of Tropical Medicine in 1912, the first Indian woman to do so.

== Career ==
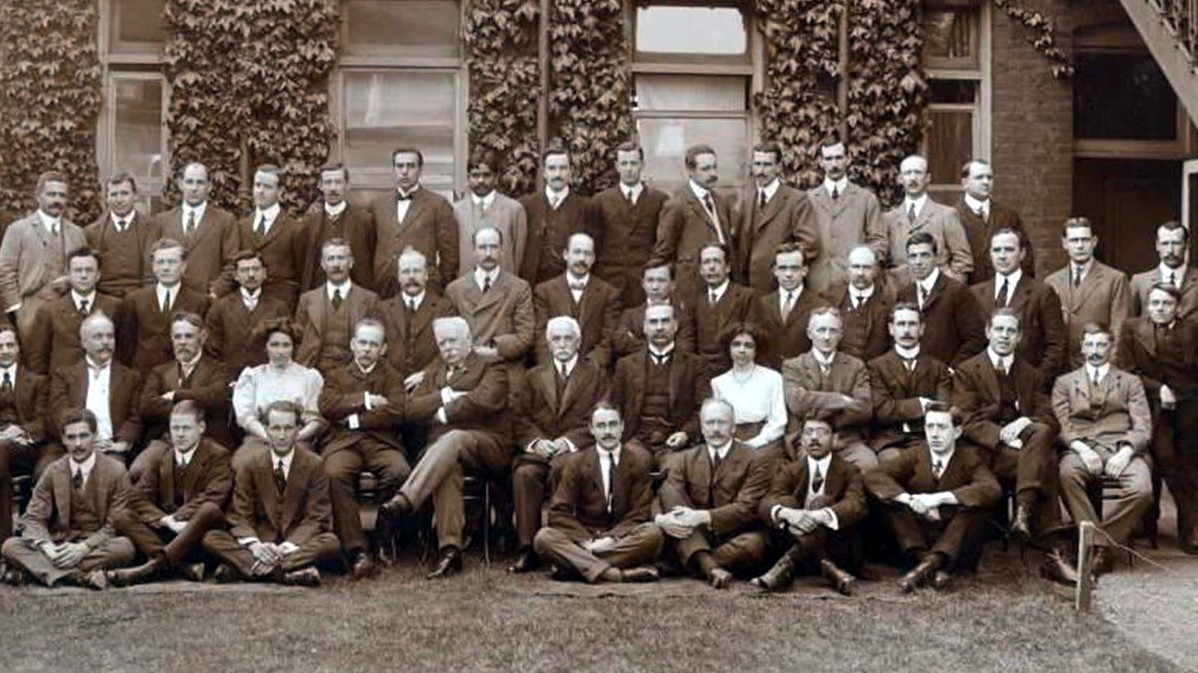
Dossibai Patell amidst a group at the London School of Tropical Medicine, c. 1912

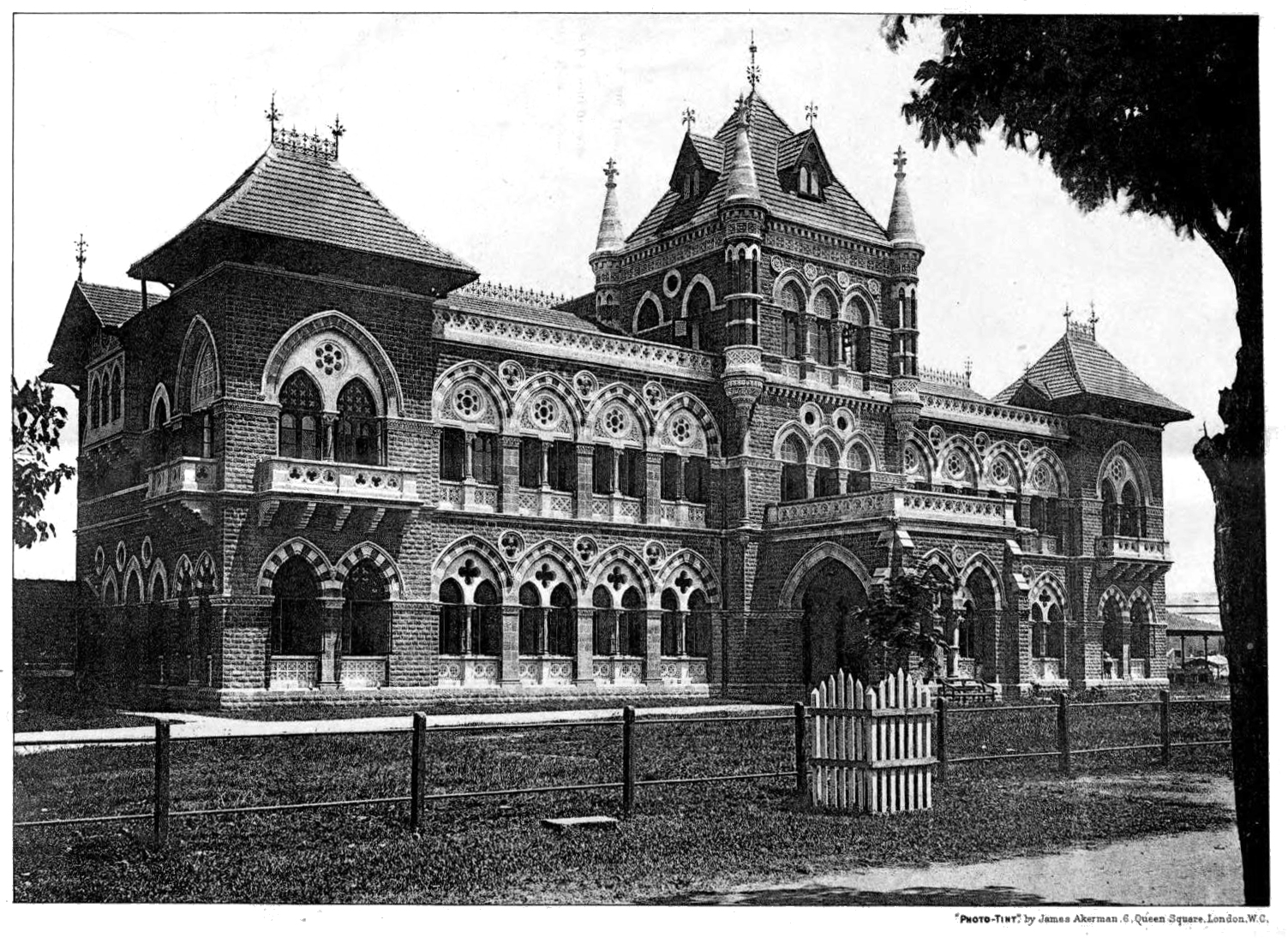
Cama Hospital

Upon return to India in 1912, as Dossibai Jehangir Ratenshaw Dadabhoy she began a career in obstetrics and gynaecology, taking a particular interest in gynaecological malignancies. As a result, she was the first person in India to purchase, possess and distribute radium.

In 1924, she presented a paper on infant mortality, stating her opinion that more than two thirds of infant deaths were preventable and petitioned for reducing these fatalities. She also considered maternal mortality and advocated supervision throughout pregnancy and childbirth and the forming of maternal and child welfare centres.

During the Second World War, she served in the Bombay Branch of the Red Cross Society. She was made MBE on 1 January 1941.

She co-founded the Bombay Obstetric and Gynaecological Society, becoming its honorary joint secretary and later its president. She worked to establish other such societies across India which came together to form the Federation of Obstetric and Gynaecological Societies of India, of which she also became president.

In 1955, she presided over the eighth All India Obstetrics and Gynaecological Congress. As president of the Association of Medical Women in India between 1937 and 1947, she served on the Bhore Committee between 1942 and 1946, dealing with health development.

She was also honorary consulting surgeon at the Cama and lbless Hospitals.

Mrs Dadabhoy was the first Indian woman to be elected a Fellow of the University of Bombay. She was made a Justice of the Peace (J.P.) in Bombay.

== Death and legacy ==
She died on 4 February 1960. The Dossibai J. R. Dadabhoy oration is given in her memory.

In 2018, Patell, along with the RCP's first female member, Ivy Evelyn Woodward, featured in the RCP's 500 year celebratory exhibition "This Vexed Question: 500 years of women in medicine".

== Selected publications ==
- "Infant Mortality, its causes and how to Remedy it" in Report of the All India Social Service Conference. Bombay: Servants of India Society, 1924. pp. 65–75.
- "Critical Analysis of 669 Caesarian Sections in the Nowrosji Wadi Maternity Hospital, Bombay", Journal of Obstetrics and Gynaecology of India, Vol. IV, No. 2, December 1953.
- "Presidential Address", at the 8th All India Obstetrics & Gynaecology Congress, Journal of Obstetrics and Gynaecology of India, Vol. V, No. 4, June 1955.
