= Ernest Greenwood (artist) =

English painter

- Born: 12 February 1913; Welling, Kent, England
- Died: 17 May 2009 (aged 96); Ashford, Kent, England
- Education: Royal College of Art
- Style: Watercolours
- Spouse: Eileen Messenger
- Elected: Royal Watercolour Society

Ernest Greenwood (12 February 1913 – 17 May 2009) was an English artist, and president of the Royal Watercolour Society from 1976 to 1984. During this time, Greenwood is credited with having brought the society from the brink of closure back to a secure position in new premises in the Bankside Gallery, London.

== Early life ==
Greenwood was born in Welling, Kent, the sixth of seven children. His father, a shipping engineer, died when he was very young and the family lived in poverty thereafter.

In 1927 Greenwood went to study at the Gravesend School of Art, winning a scholarship four years later to the Royal College of Art's painting school, where he studied under Gilbert Spencer and William Rothenstein. He spent a year at the British School in Rome before returning to the Royal College in 1935, this time to study etching with Malcolm Osborne and Robert Austin. During this time Greenwood met his future wife, Eileen Messenger, with whom he staged joint exhibitions from her house in Redcliffe Road, Chelsea. The couple married in 1939.

== World War II ==
During World War II, Greenwood was conscripted, first into the Royal Artillery and then the Army Educational Corps. At the end of the war he was working in the Rehabilitation School in Berlin. Here he made several drawings of a young man playing a grand piano amid the ruins of the city, and a major work entitled Resurrection, which is now exhibited in the Ben Uri Gallery in London along with two other of Greenwood's works.

== Later career ==
After the war, Greenwood began working as an art teacher at Chislehurst Technical High School for Girls, where he was commissioned to paint 15 murals on wooden panels, on the theme of Christmas and Easter. He went on to become an inspector of art education in schools, first for London County Council (from 1953 to 1966) then Kent LEA, until his retirement in 1973. After his retirement Greenwood expressed regret at having devoted so much time to education administration rather than art, and became a lecturer on Swan Hellenic cruises. From 1960, Greenwood lived and worked in a listed 16th-century hall house in the hamlet of Broad Street outside Hollingbourne in Kent. Towards the end of his life, Greenwood moved with his wife into sheltered accommodation in Hothfield, further toward the Kent coast.

== Art career ==
=== Societies ===
Throughout his working life, Greenwood continued to paint. His style of painting was greatly influenced by Samuel Palmer, and primarily focused on rural landscapes, either from Kent or inspired by his travels in Continental Europe. Greenwood became involved in a number of artistic societies, serving as President of the Hesketh Hubbard Art Society (1960–65), Guild of Kent Artists (1966), and most prominently the Royal Watercolour Society (RWS) (1976–84). By the time Greenwood took over as President of the RWS, its premises in Conduit Street, Central London, were in a state of disrepair and it was in an unhealthy financial situation. With the help of the architect Sir Gerald Glover, Greenwood secured a space for the Society in the newly-developed Bankside Gallery on the South Bank of the Thames, as Southwark Council looked favourably upon the inclusion of a Royal Society in the project. The new centre was opened by Queen Elizabeth II in 1980, and would later be joined by the neighbouring Tate Modern.

=== Exhibitions ===
Greenwood's work was exhibited in Canterbury in 1970, in a joint show with Hugh Casson, and in Tenterden in 1989 with John Stanton Ward and Ken Howard. He held retrospectives at the New Metropole, Folkestone in 1972 (where he first met Gerald Glover), and Maidstone County Hall Gallery in 1997. Friends of Greenwood also arranged for his work to be exhibited in Arizona. In 1994 he was invited to contribute decorations to the Judges' Chambers at Canterbury Crown Court.
