= Eileen Greenwood =

English artist (1915-2008)

Eileen Constance Greenwood RE (26 May 1915 – 23 June 2008) was an English artist, printmaker, and art teacher, specializing in etching and aquatint. She is also rarely known by her maiden name of Eileen Messenger.

== Biography ==
The daughter of Harold Messenger and Nellie Spackman, who had married the year before, she was born in London in 1915. She was educated at the Camden School for Girls and studied at the Royal College of Art from 1934 to 1937, the Courtauld Institute of Art and Goldsmiths' College. In 1935 she became an Associate in Design of the Royal College of Art. In 1939 she married the artist Ernest Greenwood (1913–2009), later a long-serving president of the Royal Watercolour Society, and they had one daughter, Dorelia, born at Witney in 1943.

Greenwood was the founding Principal of the Sittingbourne College of Education, which was the first day-college for student teachers in Kent and was opened by Princess Marina.

Greenwood exhibited works at the Royal Academy, at the Royal Institute of Painters in Water Colours and with both the Society of Women Artists and the London Group, and she had many solo exhibitions around Britain. In 1953, The Studio reported on an exhibition in Kensington that "Eileen Greenwood's excursions in flowers and still life have extracted the exotic quality of Austrian flora with authority". In 1975 she was elected a Fellow of the Royal Society of Painter-Etchers and Engravers.

Greenwood's work is represented in collections in Europe, the US, and Australia.
