= Urushibara Mokuchu =

Japanese print maker

Yoshijirō (Mokuchu) Urushibara
- Born: 1888
- Died: 1953 (aged 64–65)
- Occupation: Printmaker
- Known for: Horses

Urushibara Mokuchu (漆原木虫) (1888–1953), given name Yoshijirō, was a Japanese print maker known for his many black-and-white prints of horses. He lived in Europe for many years, and exhibited in the United States after World War II.

== Biography ==
Urushibara Yoshijirô was born in Tokyo in 1888 and studied mokuhan as a young man. In 1908, aged nineteen, he travelled to London, where he was among a group of woodblock print craftsmen who demonstrated printing techniques at the Anglo-Japanese Exhibition of 1910. He remained in London after the exhibition, restoring prints, making reproductions of prints, and mounting scrolls at the British Museum. In 1912, the British Museum employed Urushibara to make accurate copies of a famous Chinese scroll painting by Gu Kaizhi (c. 344–406 AD), the Admonitions Scroll.

After the museum job, Urushibara worked independently, becoming a significant member of a growing group of Japanese artists based in London, including Yoshio Markino and Ryuson Chuso Matsuyama. He collaborated with English and French designers on prints—notably with Frank Brangwyn. He carved and printed many prints from Frank Brangwyn's designs of horses, landscapes, and flowers. In a portfolio called "Bruges" (1919) he reproduced several of Brangwyn's watercolours as large woodblock prints. Especially interesting within the Bruges portfolio is The Bridge at Predikheren, which is published in two different sizes. The artists applied this practice to six other subjects during their period of collaboration: The Beguinage, Bruges, of c. 1919; Ruins of a Roman Bridge over the Loire River, also of 1919; The Devil's Bridge, c. 1924; Messina, Life Among the Ruins, c. 1927; Outside the Walls of Avignon, c. 1927; and The Dance of Death Bridge at Lucerne, c. 1928. It is unclear whether the smaller prints are contemporaneous to the larger impressions, and archival materials suggest that they were made later. The purpose of the scaling exercise is similarly ambiguous. Hilary Chapman hypothesises that the popularity of the subjects may have motivated Brangwyn to commission the smaller prints. In 1924, Urushibara produced with Brangwyn the portfolio Ten Woodcuts by Yoshijirô Urushibara after Designs by Frank Brangwyn. The two artists worked together until Urushibara's departure for Japan in 1940.

Urushibara was influential in the English revival of colour woodblock printing in the 1920s and 1930s. At first he carved and printed to other artists' designs, but later printed many of his own designs. He took up the 'art name' of Mokuchu (木虫), which appears on some of his print seals.

The American artist Andrew Kay Womrath studied printmaking under Urushibara, and Urushibara bought several of Womrath's works. Later Urushibara donated some of these works to the British Museum.

Urushibara returned to Japan in 1934. After 1945 he exhibited in the United States
