= Waldemar Haffkine =

Russian-French microbiologist (1856–1930)

Waldemar Mordechai Haffkine
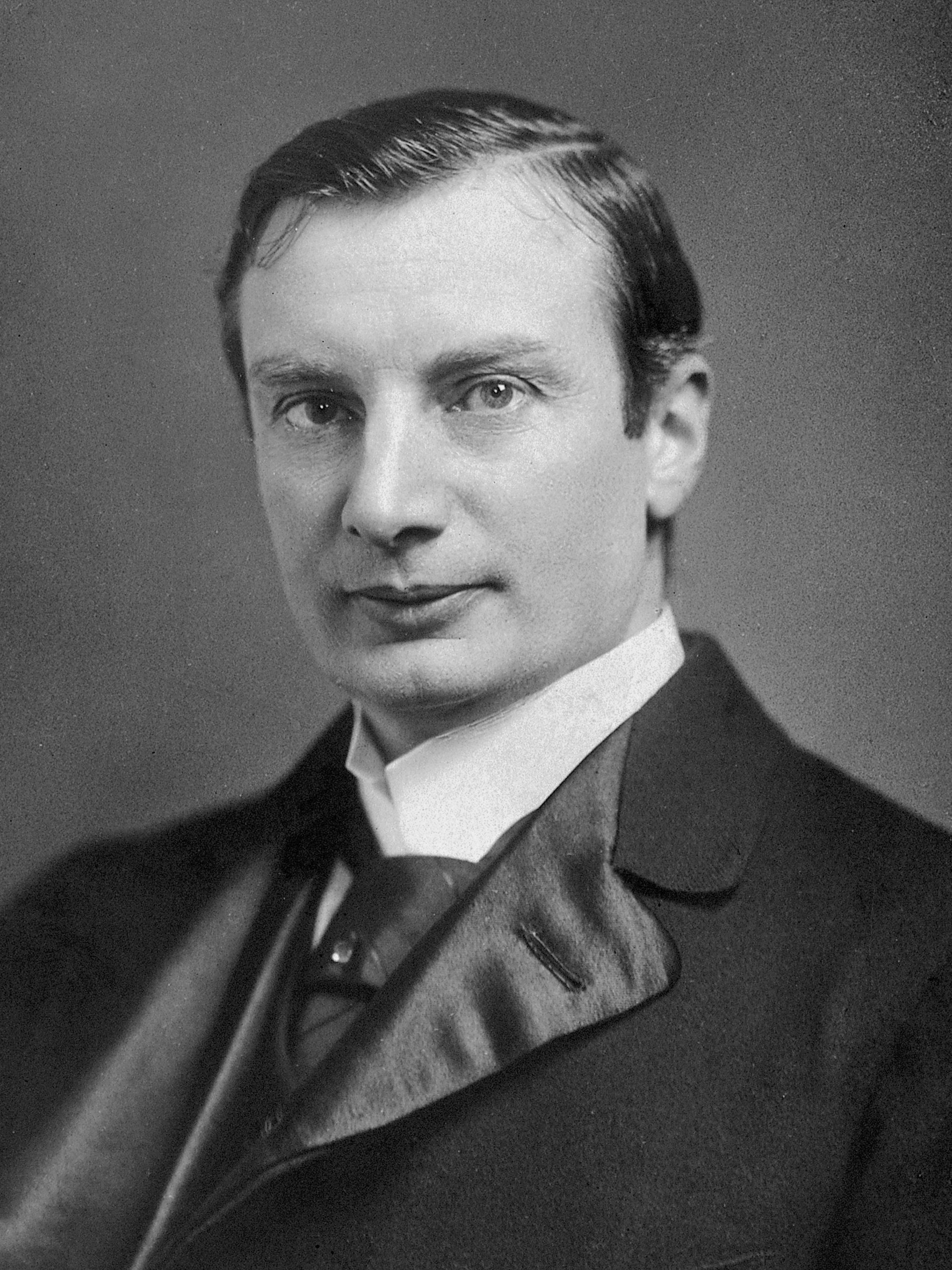
- Born: 15 March 1860; Odessa, Russian Empire
- Died: 26 October 1930 (aged 70); Lausanne, Switzerland
- Citizenship: Russian Empire; France (later); British
- Education: Odessa University
- Known for: Vaccines against cholera and bubonic plague
- Awards: Cameron Prize for Therapeutics of the University of Edinburgh (1900)
- Scientific career
- Fields: Bacteriology, protozoology
- Workplaces: Odessa University, University of Geneva, Pasteur Institute, Haffkine Institute
- Author abbrev. (botany): Khawkine

Waldemar Mordechai Wolff Haffkine CIE, born Vladimir Aronovich (Markus-Volf) Khavkin (Russian: Владимир Аронович (Маркус-Вольф) Хавкин; 15 March 1860 – 26 October 1930) was a Russian-French bacteriologist known for his pioneering work in vaccines.

Haffkine was educated at the Imperial Novorossiya University and later emigrated first to Switzerland, then to France, working at the Pasteur Institute in Paris, where he developed a cholera vaccine that he tried out successfully in India. He was naturalised a French citizen in 1898. He is recognized as the first microbiologist who developed and used vaccines against cholera and bubonic plague. He tested the vaccines on himself. Joseph Lister named him "a saviour of humanity".

He was appointed Companion of the Order of the Indian Empire (CIE) in Queen Victoria's 1897 Diamond Jubilee Honours. At that time The Jewish Chronicle noted "a Ukraine Jew, trained in the schools of European science, saves the lives of Hindus and Mohammedans and is decorated by the descendant of William the Conqueror and Alfred the Great." He naturalised as a British subject in 1900.

In his final years Haffkine became deeply religious, becoming an advocate and philanthropist for Orthodox Jewish causes and a supporter of Zionism.

== Early years ==
He was born into a Jewish family in Odessa, Kherson Governorate, Russian Empire, the fourth of five children of Aaron and Rosalie (daughter of David-Aïsic Landsberg) in a family of a Jewish schoolmaster. He received his education at the gymnasium of Berdyansk, Odessa, and St. Petersburg.

Young Haffkine was also a member of the Jewish League for Self-Defense in Odessa. In 1879 Haffkine was injured while defending a Jewish home during a pogrom. As a result of this action he was arrested but later released due to the intervention of biologist Ilya Mechnikov.

Haffkine continued his studies from 1879 to 1883 with Mechnikov at Odessa University, but after the assassination of Tsar Alexander II, the government increasingly cracked down on people it considered suspicious, including intelligentsia. Haffkine graduated as a Doctor of Science at the age of 23. Haffkine was also employed by the zoological museum at Odessa from 1882 to 1888. Debarred from professorship, as a Jew, in 1888, Haffkine was allowed to emigrate to Switzerland and began his work at the University of Geneva, as an assistant professor of Physiology. In 1889 he joined Mechnikov and Louis Pasteur in Paris at the newly established Pasteur Institute where he took up the only available post of librarian.

== Protozoological studies ==
Haffkine began his scientific career as a protozoologist and protistologist, under the tutelage of Ilya Mechnikov at Imperial Novorossiya University in Odessa and later at the Pasteur Institute in Paris. His early research was on protists such as Astasia, Euglena, and Paramecium, as well as the earliest studies on Holospora, a bacterial parasite of Paramecium. In the early 1890s, Haffkine shifted his attention to studies in practical bacteriology.

The euglenid genus Khawkinea is named in honor of Haffkine's early studies of euglenids, first published in French journals with the author name transliterated from Cyrillic as "Mardochée-Woldemar Khawkine".

== Anti-cholera vaccine ==
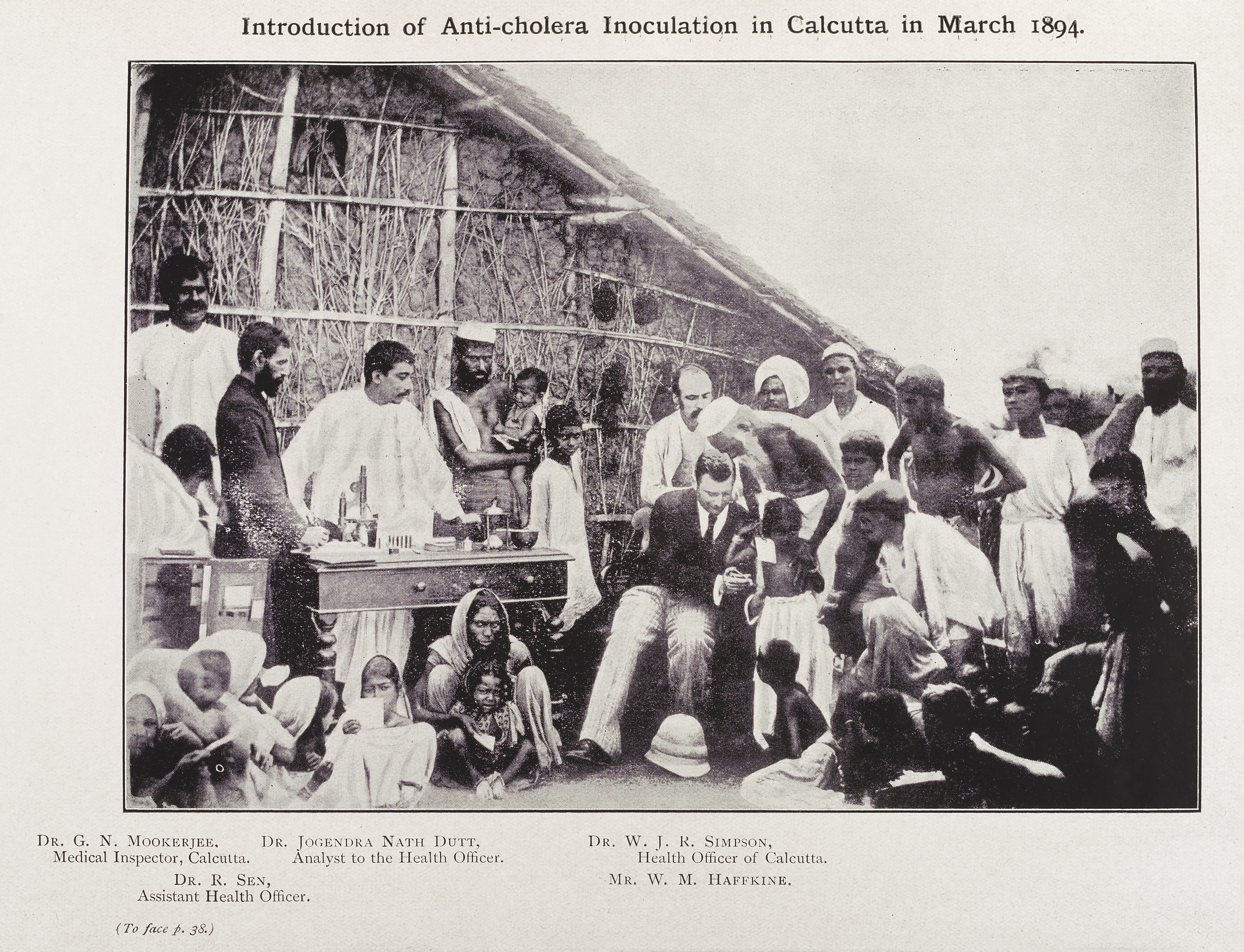
Haffkine during anti-cholera vaccination in Calcutta, March 1894

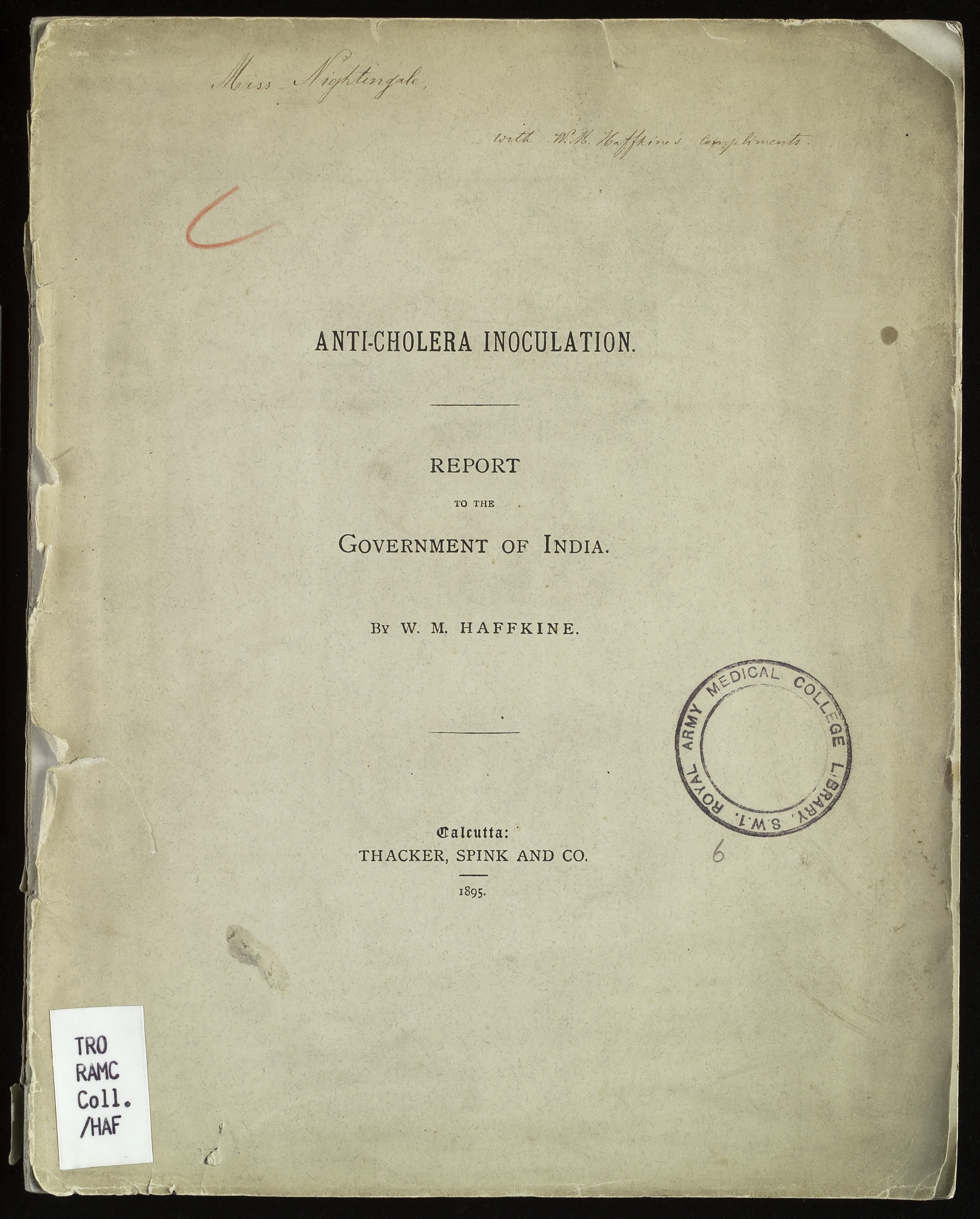
Haffkine's report on the anti-cholera vaccination campaign, 1895

At the time, one of the five great cholera pandemics of the 19th century ravaged Asia and Europe. Even though Robert Koch discovered Vibrio cholerae in 1883, the medical science at that time did not consider it a sole cause of the disease. This view was supported by experiments by several biologists, notably Jaume Ferran i Clua in Spain.

Haffkine focused his research on developing a cholera vaccine, and produced an attenuated form of the bacterium. Risking his own life, on 18 July 1892, Haffkine performed the first human test on himself and reported his findings on 30 July to the Biological Society. Even though his discovery caused an enthusiastic stir in the press, it was not widely accepted by his senior colleagues, including both Mechnikov and Pasteur, nor by European official medical establishment in France, Germany and Russia.

Haffkine considered India, where hundreds of thousands died from the ongoing pandemic, as the best place to test his vaccine. Through the influence of the Marquis of Dufferin and Ava, who was in Paris as the British ambassador, he was allowed to demonstrate his ideas in England. He proceeded to India in 1893 where he conducted large-scale trials of his vaccine.

He contracted malaria in the fall of 1895, traveled to England to recuperate, and returned to India in 1896.

== Anti-plague vaccine ==
In October 1896, an epidemic of bubonic plague struck Bombay and the government asked Haffkine to help. He embarked upon the development of a vaccine in a makeshift laboratory in a corridor of Grant Medical College in Bombay. In three months of persistent work (one of his assistants experienced a nervous breakdown; two others quit), a form for human trials was ready.

Haffkine was the first to prepare a vaccine for human prophylaxis by killing virulent culture by heat at 60 °C. "Haffkine's vaccine used a small amount of the bacteria to produce an immune reaction."

On 10 January 1897, Haffkine tested the vaccine on himself. After these results were announced to the authorities, volunteers at the Byculla jail were inoculated and survived the epidemics, while seven inmates of the control group died.

"Like others of these early vaccines, the Haffkine formulation had nasty side effects, and did not provide complete protection, though it was said to have reduced risk by up to 50 percent." The major limitation of his vaccine was the lack of activity against pulmonary forms of plague. "Unlike tetanus or diphtheria, which were quickly neutralized by effective vaccines by the 1920s, the immunological aspects of bubonic plague proved to be much more daunting."

Despite Haffkine's successes, some officials still primarily insisted on methods based on sanitarianism: washing homes by fire hose with lime, herding affected and suspected persons into camps and hospitals, and restricting travel.

Even though official Russia was still unsympathetic to his research, Haffkine's Russian colleagues, doctors V. K. Vysokovich and D. K. Zabolotny, visited him in Bombay. During the 1898 cholera outbreak in the Russian Empire, the vaccine called "лимфа Хавкина" ("limfa Havkina", Havkin's lymph) saved thousands of lives across the empire.

By the turn of the 20th century, the number of plague vaccine recipients in India alone reached four million and Haffkine was appointed the Director of the Plague Laboratory in Bombay (now called Haffkine Institute). In 1900, he was awarded the Cameron Prize for Therapeutics of the University of Edinburgh.

== Connection with Zionism ==
In 1898, Haffkine approached Aga Khan III with an offer for Sultan Abdul Hamid II to resettle Jews in Palestine, then split between a number of subdivisions of the Ottoman Empire: the effort "could be progressively undertaken in the Holy Land", "the land would be obtained by purchase from the Sultan's subjects", "the capital was to be provided by wealthier members of the Jewish community", but the plan was rejected.

== Mulkowal disaster ("Little Dreyfus affair") ==
In March 1902, 19 villagers from Mulkowal in Punjab (inoculated from a single bottle of Haffkine's plague vaccine) died of tetanus, whilst the other 88 villagers were well. This "Mulkowal disaster" led to an enquiry. Evidence pointed to the contamination of one bottle of vaccine. The procedure for sterilisation at Haffkine's Parel lab had been changed from carbolic acid to sterilisation using heating, a process that had been used at the Pasteur Institute safely for two years but was new in the British Empire. The 1903 commission from the Indian government concluded this was the source of the contamination, indicting Haffkine. He was relieved of his position and returned to England. His vaccine continued to be used in India.

The Indian government's full findings were published in 1906, finding Haffkine guilty. After reading the report, professor William John Ritchie Simpson attempted to exonerate Haffkine in a letter to the British Medical Journal, pointing out that contamination of the bottle in Bombay would have led to much stronger tetanus growth than what was observed, and noticing that the assistant in Punjab who had handled the bottle had dropped an instrument to the floor without properly sterilizing it afterwards, and then used it to open the bottle's stopper.

The Lister Institute reinvestigated the claim and overruled the verdict on discovering the stopper contamination incident. In July 1907, a letter published in The Times called the case against Haffkine "distinctly disproven". It was signed by Ronald Ross, William R. Smith, and Simon Flexner, among other medical dignitaries. This led to Haffkine's acquittal and rehabilitation.

Historian Simon Schama later likened the case to the Dreyfus Affair; the report was unofficially known as the "Little Dreyfus affair", as a reminder of Haffkine's Jewish background and religion. Author Paul Twivy researched Haffkine and said "a number of doctors within the British Raj were envious of him and extremely antagonistic to him because he was Jewish, Russian and he wasn't a doctor", and that they hid evidence that an assistant had contaminated an instrument.

== Later years ==
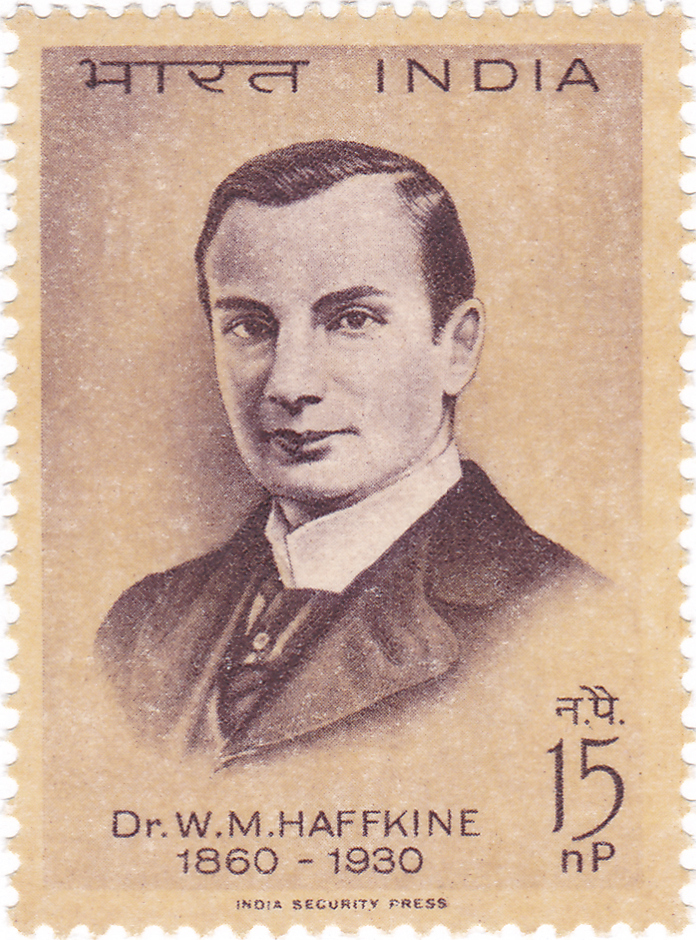
Haffkine on a 1964 stamp of India

Since Haffkine's post in Bombay was already occupied, he moved to Calcutta and worked there as director in chief of the Calcutta Biological Laboratory. He was however confined to theoretical research, being prevented from conducting any practical trials. Haffkine retired in 1914, returned to France and later moved to Lausanne, Switzerland, where he spent the last years of his life.

== Influence ==
Historian Simon Schama researched Haffkine for his book Foreign Bodies: the Terror of Contagion, the Ingenuity of Science, and advised Paul Twivy on a play he was writing about Haffkine. Schama likened the persecution of Haffkine to the Dreyfus Affair, not just because of the injustice but also for the way the authorities, faced with conclusive evidence of their wrongdoing, resisted admitting it. Twivy said "There is no doubt that we would not have survived pandemics without Haffkine, even though he's not known. He developed vaccines against two of the biggest killers ever. He is literally the most important scientist in terms of the number of lives he saved."

== Recognition ==
Haffkine received numerous honors and awards. In 1925, the Plague Laboratory in Bombay was renamed the Haffkine Institute. In commemoration of the centennial of his birth, Haffkine Park was planted in Israel in the 1960s.

=== Orthodox Judaism ===
In a biography of him, Nobelist Selman Abraham Waksman explains that, in this last phase of his life, Haffkine had become a deeply religious man. Haffkine returned to Orthodox Jewish practice and wrote A Plea for Orthodoxy (1916). In this article, he advocated traditional religious observance and decried the lack of such observance among "enlightened" Jews, and stressed the importance of community life, stating:

A brotherhood built up of racial ties, long tradition, common suffering, faith and hope, is a union ready-made, differing from artificial unions in that the bonds existing between the members contain an added promise of duration and utility. Such a union takes many centuries to form and is a power for good, the neglect or disuse of which is as much an injury to humanity as the removal of an important limb is to the individual... no law of nature operates with more fatality and precision than the law according to which those communities survive in the strife for existence that conform the nearest to the Jewish teachings on the relation of man to his Creator; on the ordering of time for work and rest; on the formation of families and the duties of husband and wife, parents and children; on the paramount obligations of truthfulness and justice between neighbor and neighbor and to the stranger within the gates.

— Haffkine (1916)

In 1929, he established the Haffkine Foundation to foster Jewish education in Eastern Europe. Haffkine was also respectful of other religions, and "he considered it of the utmost importance to promote the study of the Bible."

In 1982, the Chabad Hasidic movement published three letters addressed to Haffkine by the sixth Lubavitcher Rebbe, Rabbi Yosef Yitzchak Schneersohn, who had engaged Haffkine to support the Jews living in communist Russia.

== Sources ==
- "Хавкин, Владимир Ааронович" . Brockhaus and Efron Encyclopedic Dictionary (in Russian). 1906.
- Edinger, Henry. "The Lonely Odyssey of W.M.W. Haffkine", In Jewish Life Volume 41, No. 2 (Spring 1974).
- Waksman, Selman A. The Brilliant and Tragic Life of W.M.W. Haffkine: Bacteriologist, Rutgers University Press (1964).
- Hanhart, Joel. Lausanne University, Faculté de biologie et médecine. Haffkine, une esquisse: biographie intellectuelle et analytique de Waldemar Mordekhaï Haffkine 2013
- Prix de thèse 2014 – Société des Etudes Juives Societe des Etudes Juives societedesetudesjuives.org, accessed 11 December 2020
- Lutzker, Edythe (1970–1980). "Haffkine, Waldemar Mordecai Wolfe". Dictionary of Scientific Biography. Vol. 6. New York: Charles Scribner's Sons. pp. 11–13. ISBN 978-0-684-10114-9.
- Hanhart, Joel. "Waldemar Mordekhaï Haffkine (1860–1930)". Biographie intellectuelle, Éditions Honoré Champion (2016), ISBN 978-2-7453-3074-1.
- Hanhart, Joel. "Un illustre inconnu. Une biographie du docteur" Waldemar Mordekhaï Haffkine, Éditions Lichma (2017), ISBN 978-2-912553-84-3.
- Markish, David. Mahatma. The Savior Mankind Never Knew (Translated by Marian Schwartz). Mahatma Haffkine Foundation, Aleksandr Duel, New-York, 2019.
