= Hanumant B. Neugi =

Indian painter and photographer (1911 – unknown)

Hanumant Balakrishna Neugi (10 October 1911 – unknown), also known as Hemant, was a well-known Indian painter and photographer from Goa. He worked across various creative fields, including art direction in the Indian cinema industry and scientific illustration at the Haffkine Institute.

== Early life and education ==
Hanumant Neugi was born on 10 October 1911 in Margao, Goa. His family originally hailed from Kalapur in Tiswadi. However, due to harassment by the Portuguese authorities during a period of religious conversions, his family relocated to Belgaum. The family later returned to Goa, staying briefly in Mapusa before permanently settling down in Margao.

Neugi completed his primary education up to matriculation at Damodar Vidyalaya in Margao. He developed a strong inclination toward drawing and painting during his childhood. In 1930, he began his initial training in art under the guidance of the prominent artist Prabhakar Mulgaonkar. Seeking further education, he moved to Mumbai in 1934, where he studied at the Ketkar Art Institute in Girgaon for three years. In 1937, he completed his degree in art from the J. J. School of Art in Mumbai. Following his graduation, he returned to Goa due to his father's deteriorating health.

== Career ==
Finding limited professional scope for his artwork in Goa, Neugi returned to Mumbai in 1941. His artistic focus on nature landscapes and human portraiture provided him with substantial opportunities in the film industry, where he worked in art direction for three years.

In 1945, Neugi travelled extensively across India—visiting Gwalior, Delhi, Agra, Ujjain, Baroda, and Jaipur—specifically to paint. During this tour, he produced approximately 150 paintings capturing the views of these locations. Impressed by this collection of work, the Haffkine Institute in Mumbai invited him to join their organization as an artist and photographer. Neugi accepted the position and served continuously at the institution for 25 years, retiring in 1968, after which he moved back to Goa.

== Artistic style and recognition ==
Neugi's paintings regularly appeared in the Marathi publication Mouj. He also created specialized artwork and illustrations for films such as Badi Maa, Saubhadra, and Praful. Artistically, he was highly recognized for his skill in portraying human emotions; he was particularly adept at capturing effective, shifting facial expressions on the same face at different moments.

In 1938, an exhibition of his paintings was organized in Goa. The then-serving Juiz da Relação (a high court judge) highly praised his artwork and presented cash prizes and gold medals for two of his standout paintings. Later, during 1981–1982, the Department of Sports and Culture of the Government of Goa officially honored him with an award for his artistic achievements.

== Legacy ==
The Kala Academy awards the Late Hanumant B. Neugi Memorial Prize to artists in Neugi's honour.
