= Sahib Singh Sokhey =

Indian biochemist, British Indian Army general and military physician

Sir Sahib Singh Sokhey
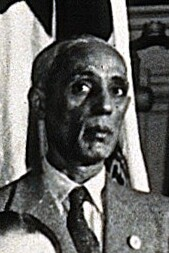
- Credit: Wellcome Library
- Born: 15 December 1887; Amritsar, Punjab Province, British Raj
- Died: 24 October 1971 (aged 83); New Delhi, India
- Citizenship: British Indian (1887-1947); Indian (1947-1971)
- Education: University of Edinburgh
- Known for: Science, war work
- Awards: Knighthood (1946); Lenin Peace Prize (1953)
- Scientific career
- Fields: Biochemistry
- Workplaces: Haffkine Institute
- Doctoral advisor: Otto Folin
- Military career
- Branch: British Indian Army
- Service years: 1913–1947
- Rank: Major-General
- Units: Indian Medical Service; Indian Army Medical Corps
- Conflicts: First World War: Western Front; Second World War

Member of Parliament, Rajya Sabha
- In office 3 April 1952 – 2 April 1956

Major General Sir Sahib Singh Sokhey FNA, FASc (15 December 1887 – 24 October 1971) was an Indian biochemist, a British Indian Army general and a military physician who was also a nominated member of the Rajya Sabha, the Upper House of the Indian Parliament, from 3 April 1952 to 2 April 1956.

== Early life and career ==
Sahib Singh Sokhey was born in Amritsar, Punjab on 15 December 1887 to Sardar Jwala Singh Sokhey, a civil engineer who worked on various irrigation projects in the Punjab and in Burma, then part of British India. A brilliant student, he completed his initial studies at the Central Medical School and at Government College, Lahore, taking an honours degree in physics and chemistry from the University of the Punjab in 1905. After a year at the Lahore Medical College (now King Edward Medical University), he went to the University of Edinburgh in 1907. At Edinburgh, he completed his MBBS degree in 1911, followed by an MA in economics in 1912.

In 1913, Sokhey sat the Indian Medical Service (IMS) examinations, passing first. He was commissioned a lieutenant in the IMS on 26 July 1913. During the First World War, he served in France on the Western Front, and was promoted to captain on 26 July 1916 (antedated to 1 September 1915). After the war, he served in Mesopotamia until 1921, when he returned to India. He subsequently commanded the Indian Military Hospital at Kolkata for two years.

== Medical researcher ==
In 1923, he was awarded a Rockefeller Fellowship for post-graduate studies abroad. From 1923 to 1925, he studied clinical biochemistry under noted American biochemist Otto Folin at Harvard University, subsequently studying in Toronto under Nobel laureate John MacLeod, a co-discoverer of insulin. He was promoted to major on 26 January 1925, and completed an MD from Edinburgh the same year, also conducting research on nutrition at Trinity College, Cambridge under the distinguished biochemist and future Nobel laureate Frederick Gowland Hopkins.

Following his return to India in mid-1925, Major Sokhey was appointed an assistant director at the Haffkine Institute in Mumbai on 18 August of that year. His earliest research at the Institute involved the biochemistry of coeliac disease, then known as "sprue." In connection with this research, Sokhey conducted clinical studies of the metabolisms of men and women in Mumbai, to compare their metabolisms with those of Europeans. In 1926, he established a Biochemistry Department at the institute, becoming its first Indian director in 1932. He was promoted to lieutenant-colonel on 26 January 1933. As Director, Colonel Sokhey expanded the scope of the institute, establishing an Entomology Department (1938), a Serum Department (1940) to manufacture vaccines, antitoxins and snake antivenin, a Chemotherapy Department (1940) to conduct research into sulfa and synthetic pharmaceuticals, a Pharmacology Department (1943) and a Nutrition Department (1944).

From 1932 through the Second World War, Sokhey primarily focused on expanding the institute's vaccine production and development capacity and improving the quality of its various vaccines and antitoxins. Under Sokhey's supervision, the Institute initiated studies on antibiotic therapies for plague, beginning with sulfathiazole in 1939 and continuing with tetracyclines and related antibiotics during and after the Second World War. In 1943, due to wartime needs, the Indian Medical Service was merged with the Indian Medical Department and the Indian Hospital and Nursing Corps, becoming the Indian Army Medical Corps. Sokhey was promoted to colonel in the newly reorganised service branch on 15 December 1944 (seniority from 26 January 1936).

Towards the end of the war, Sokhey established pilot plants at the institute to manufacture sulfathiazole, paludrine, chloroquine and penicillin. From 1944 to 1946, he served on the Pharmaceutical and Drug Committee of the government Planning Department. He also served on a committee tasked with establishing the National Chemical Laboratory and the National Physical Laboratory. In 1946, he was among the key individuals involved in establishing a penicillin manufacturing plant, which later became Hindustan Antibiotics. On 14 August 1947, the day before Indian independence, Sokhey was promoted to the local rank of major-general in his role as director of the Haffkine Institute, subsequently retiring from the Indian Army.

== World Health Organization and later life ==
In 1949, General Sokhey retired from the directorship of the Haffkine Institute after a 17-year tenure. During a visit to Bombay, Brock Chisholm, the Director-General of the World Health Organization, met Sokhey; impressed by his achievements, he offered Sokhey the post of Assistant Director General (Technical Services) in the WHO, with the responsibility for epidemiology, health statistics and biological standardisation. Sokhey served in this position in Geneva until 1952, when he completed his term and returned to India. In 1952, he was nominated to the Rajya Sabha, the upper house of Parliament, retiring a few years later. In 1953–54, Sokhey obtained the assistance of Soviet officials to build a large public-sector pharmaceutical plant in India, today known as Indian Drugs and Pharmaceuticals Limited (IDPL).

In his retirement, Sokhey chaired the All-India Peace Council and the Pharmaceutical and Drugs Committee of the CSIR. In 1962, he became a personal advisor to the Director-General of the CSIR, Syed Hussein Zahir, and was appointed an Emeritus Scientist in 1965. He died at his New Delhi residence on 24 October 1971, aged 83.

== Personal life ==
Sokhey was married to Leila Roy (1899-1947), a famous kathak dancer known as "Madame Menaka." Lady Sokhey spent much of her career travelling across India and Europe with her dance troupe. Her death in 1947 left Sokhey a lonely widower. The couple had no children, and Sokhey never remarried.

Sokhey was a reader, with an appreciation of classical Indian art. A friend of Prime Minister Jawaharlal Nehru, he was a leftist, and adovcated in favour of Communism and the Soviet Union.

== Honours ==
Sokhey was a founding Fellow of the Indian National Science Academy (1935), and of the Indian Academy of Sciences. For his achievements as director of the Haffkine Institute, especially in the area of vaccine production and development, Sokhey was knighted in the British 1946 New Year Honours list, and was formally invested with his knighthood by the Viceroy, Lord Wavell, at Viceroy's House (now Rashtrapati Bhavan) in New Delhi on 9 March 1946. He was awarded the Stalin Prize by the Soviet government in 1947.
