= Adam Fox (disambiguation) =

Adam Fox is an American ice hockey player.

Adam Fox may also refer to:

- Adam Fox (poet) (1883–1977), British poet
- Adam Fox (allergist), British allergist
- Adam Fox, American convicted conspirator in the Gretchen Whitmer kidnapping plot
