= Madame Menaka =

Indian dancer

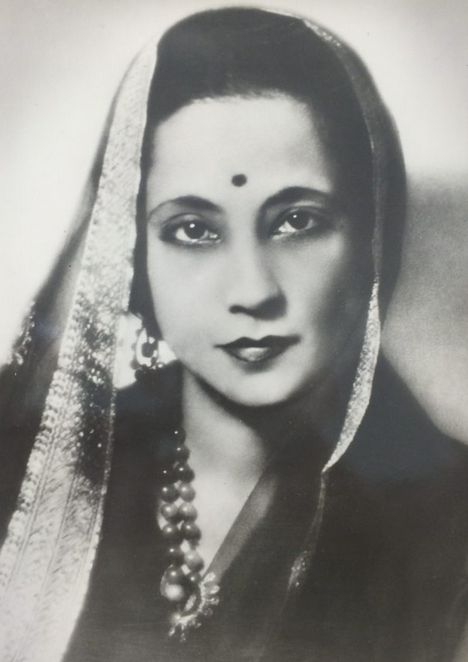
- Menaka (Leila Sokhey), from a 1938 publication
- Born: Leila Roy; October 15, 1899; Barisal, East Bengal
- Died: May 30, 1947 (aged 47)
- Other name: Leila Sokhey
- Occupation: Dancer
- Spouse: Sahib Singh Sokhey

Madame Menaka (October 15, 1899 – May 30, 1947) was the professional name of Leila Roy, Lady Sokhey, an Indian dancer and choreographer in the Kathak tradition.

== Early life and education ==
Leila Roy was born in Barisal, Bengal Presidency, the daughter of Pyare Lal Roy and Lolita Roy. Her father was a Bengali lawyer trained in England, and her mother was British. She attended the Loreto Convent in Darjeeling and St Paul’s School in London. She trained as a violinist in England, but pursued dance as a career, with encouragement from Russian ballet dancer Anna Pavlova, whom she met in London in 1927. Her Kathak dance teachers included Pandit Sitaram Prasad and Achhan Maharaj.

== Career ==
Sokhey gave dance recitals in Bombay in 1928, and began choreographing and teaching dance to students at the Haffkine Institute. She danced in Paris in 1930, and her Menaka dance company toured Europe from 1935 to 1938. They entered the Berlin Dance Olympiad, in conjunction with the Summer Olympics in Berlin in 1936, and won several trophies. She met modern dancer Mary Wigman during her time in Germany. Her company and choreography appeared in at least two European films, the German-language Der Tiger von Eschnapur (1938) and a British documentary in color, Temples of India (1938).

In 1941, with her husband's financial support, Menaka opened a residential school outside Bombay in Khandala, named Nrityalayam. One of her students was her adopted daughter, dancer Damayanti Joshi, who later published a book of photographs and memories of Menaka.

== Personal life ==
Leila Roy married Sahib Singh Sokhey, a biochemist. Their large home at the Haffkine Institute in Parel included her dance studio and was frequently host to visiting scientists and artists. "Imperious, unconventional, sympathetic, big-hearted, she charms all with her intelligence and understanding," wrote a contemporary. "Her artificialities of vivid make-up and finery in dress are superficial and skin-deep, so to speak; she is, at heart, genuinely natural and simple." Following her husband's knighthood in 1946, she became Lady Sokhey. She died from Bright's disease in 1947, aged 47 years. The University of Mumbai awards a Menaka Trophy for excellence in Kathak dance.
