= Frederick Percival Mackie =

English physician

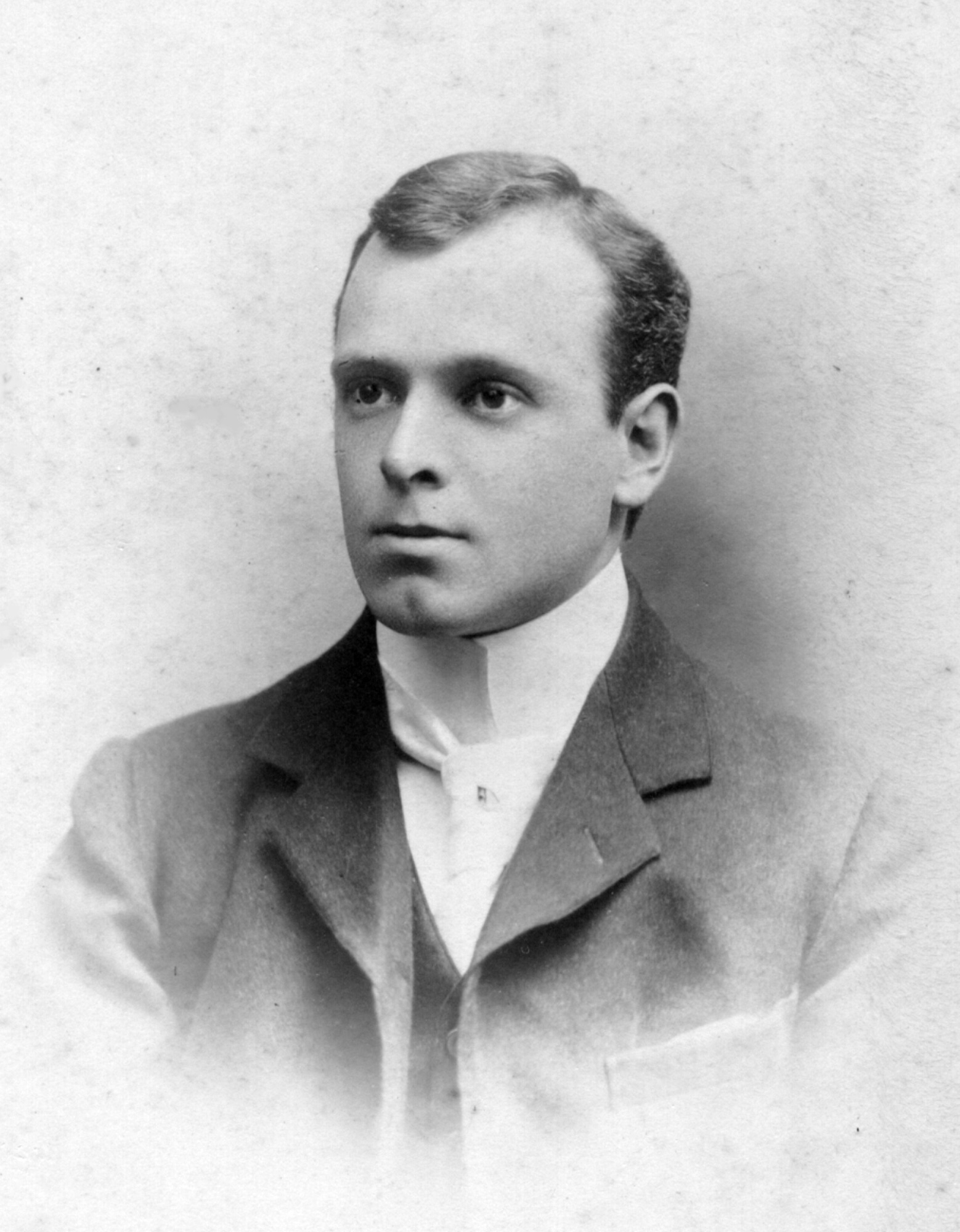
Percival Mackie in March 1900

Colonel Frederick Percival Mackie CSI OBE KHS FRCP FRCS (19 February 1875 – 15 July 1944) was an English physician who served in the Indian Medical Service between 1901 and 1931 working on the incidence, transmission, and pathology of insect-borne tropical diseases. He discovered the vectors for relapsing fever and kala-azar. He had important administrative responsibilities in Iraq during the First World War and emerged as a leading figure in Indian medical science, public health, and tropical hygiene between the wars as director of the Haffkine Institute in Bombay (Mumbai).

== Personal life and career ==
Born on 19 February 1875 to Annis, née Bennett, and John Mackie, rector of Filton, Gloucestershire, England, Frederick Percival ("Per") was the second of their four surviving children. At the time of his marriage to Annis, John already had seven children by a previous marriage, and it fell to Annis to become, with the addition of her own four, mother or stepmother to eleven children. She was a devoted parent, kept closely in touch with them, and chronicled their doings almost until the time of her death in 1927. Her family chronicles provided much of the material included in a memoir by one of her grandchildren, which contains a more detailed account of Percival Mackie's early years, his boyhood adventures and schooling, his academic successes, the women he married, his character, and career highlights as seen from her maternal perspective.

=== Medical training ===
Mackie showed an early interest in anatomy. Family legend has it that when the family dog died, he boiled it up in a huge cauldron on the vicarage lawn until the bones came loose so that he could take them out and dry them and reassemble the dog as a skeleton. He received his early education at Dean Close School, Cheltenham, and his basic medical training at the University of Bristol Medical School and St Bartholomew's Hospital. London. His exceptional ability was quickly recognized. As Saunders scholar (1897) and silver medallist at Bristol General Hospital, he completed his final exams in 1898 and was immediately appointed to a position as Casualty Officer and House Physician. During this time, in December 1898, he published his first of some 85 scientific papers, "Notes on a Case of Blackwater Fever" in The Lancet. A year later he was Junior Medical Officer at County Medical Asylum in Shrewsbury, and then spent 18 months as Superintendent at the Bristol City Isolation Hospital at Ham Green. He entered the Indian Medical Service (I.M.S.), passing out in first place in 1902, aged 27, with a gold medal in medicine. Later in his career he added the F.R.C.P and the F.R.C.S as well as the D.P.H to his professional qualifications.

=== 1903–1914 research on tropical diseases ===
Soon after his arrival in India in 1903, Mackie joined the Younghusband Expedition to Tibet as medical officer, with the military rank of Lieutenant, attached to the 38th Central India Horse Regiment. On his return, he became assistant director of the Plague Research Laboratory in Bombay (Mumbai) and began working on plague, a topic to which he returned some 20 years later. In 1905, W.B. Bannerman, the director of the laboratory, wrote that, "Capt. Mackie has served under me for the past 6 months. He has good intelligence, ability and self-reliance and is very pleasant to work with. His professional efficiency is of a high order and he is tactful in his dealings with his subordinates. He is zealous and diligent in the discharge of his professional duties and his conduct is excellent." Throughout his life, so far as his administrative duties permitted, Mackie devoted himself to the study of plague and other tropical disease. As he later put it in his presidential address to the Medical Research Section of the Indian Science Congress "For nearly twenty years my principal interest has been in the relationship of insects to the transmission of disease, having devoted successive periods of time to fleas and plague, bugs and lice and relapsing fever, mosquitoes and malaria, tse-tse flies and sleeping sickness, and to the insect side of the kala-azar problem."

=== Relapsing fever ===
While at the Plague Research Laboratory he made what was probably his chief contribution to medicine, the discovery that the body louse, a blood-sucking insect, might serve as a vector for the transmission of relapsing fever. In August 1907 Mackie was sent to investigate an outbreak of relapsing fever that had broken out at a mission settlement in Nasik (now Nashik), in the state of Maharashtra. The boys and girls residing at the settlement were housed in separate, similar bungalows but many more of the boys than the girls were taken ill with the disease and Mackie's investigation pointed to the cause. The boys were found to be infested with body lice, while the girls were almost free of them. Confirmation of the body louse as vector came from microscopic examination of the lice, which showed they were carrying large numbers of the spirochetes characterizing the human disease and that they were multiplying within the insects' stomachs. It was subsequently found that transmission occurs when the louse is crushed against the victim's skin.

=== Royal Society Sleeping Sickness Commission ===
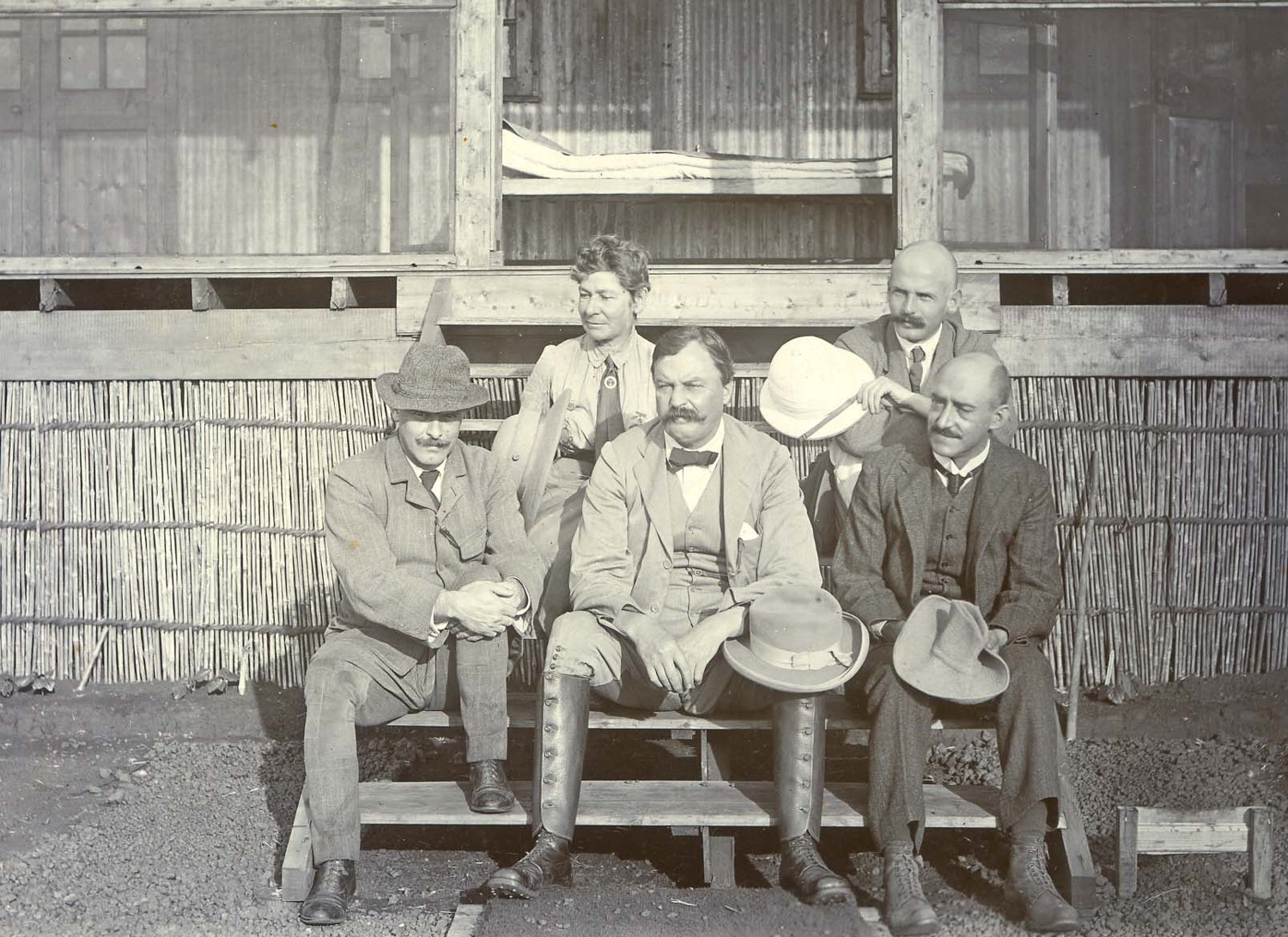
L-R Percival Mackie, Lady Bruce, Sir David Bruce, H. R. Bateman, A. E. Hamerton. Photo courtesy of Peter and Joanna Mackie

A pressing issue at the time was the possibility of African sleeping sickness (trypanosomiasis) spreading to India via similar blood-sucking insect vectors. In September 1908, at the request of the Indian Government, Captain Mackie was attached to the Royal Society's Sleeping Sickness Commission headed by Sir David Bruce F.R.S. Based at Mpumo, Uganda. Mackie was one of Bruce's youthful "Three Musketeers," the others being Captains H.R. Bateman and Albert Ernest Hamerton. The accompanying photo shows (L to R) Mackie, Lady Bruce, Bruce, Bateman and Hamerton at their lab in Uganda, 1908. The work in Africa represented a huge step forward in the understanding of trypanosome-related diseases not only in humans (using monkeys as models) but in domestic cattle and wild animals, including elephants. Some 17 publications arose from this work in which Mackie was a co-author. Of the many species of Trypanosoma studied only T. gambiense (now T. brucei gambiense) causes sleeping sickness in humans. The disease is spread by blood sucking insects of the genus Glossina, which include tse-tse flies. The researchers studied the length of time tse-tse flies retained the parasite, how long it took to mature, how long the flies remained capable of transmitting the infection, what proportion of flies were infected, how many were required to cause sickness, whether transmission could occur "mechanically" by surface contact of the fly's mouthparts, and many other aspects. In a critical series of experiments it was found that the flies remained infective for up to 75 days after becoming infected themselves and that a tiny drop of fluid taken from the gut of the 75-day-old fly injected under the skin of a monkey gave rise to sleeping sickness after an incubation period of eight days. The commission's work served to reassure the Indian government that there was no risk of sleeping sickness spreading to India as it was clear that only Glossina could carry the infection and no species of this genus were native to India.

=== Kala-Azar ===
Mackie was recalled to India in 1909 and appointed Special Research Officer (Government of India) for the investigation of kala-azar (visceral leishmaniasis). In 1914 he studied cases of kala-azar in Nowgong, Assam, where there were many cases of the disease among the local population. He noted that anopheline mosquitoes were rare, but species of Culex and Phlebotomus (sand flies) were common. Examination of 273 patients showed an abundance of LD bodies (cells infected with a non-motile stage of the parasite Leishmania donovani) in the blood and in splenic biopsies. Mackie captured insects on fly papers and examined them for stages of the parasite. He found flagellated forms of the parasite in sand flies of the genus Phlebotomus. The topographical distribution of kala-azar closely matched the distribution of the sand flies. This pointed to sand flies as the blood-sucking insects that serve as vectors for the disease. Other workers were engaged in similar investigations elsewhere in India, and it was unclear who had priority, but it was eventually accepted that "F.P. Mackie was probably the first to note this association. The only insect which has given any return for the work put into it is the sandfly."

=== War service in Mesopotamia ===
At the outbreak of war in 1914, Mackie returned to active military service in Baluchistan, Persia, Mesopotamia, and France. We know most about his time in Mesopotamia (modern Iraq) from a series of laboratory records and articles he himself wrote for newspapers.

Late in 1915, the British campaign to end Ottoman control of Mesopotamia was focussed on relief of the besieged British forces at Kut, where the British 6th Army Division was engaging Turkish forces, with heavy casualties on both sides. Mackie brought a fully equipped laboratory from France to Basra. From there he was directed to proceed to Amara where there were thousands of British and Indian military personnel in hospitals, few of which had adequate pathology backup. Rather than equipping every hospital with fully equipped testing laboratories, the British established central laboratories, first in Amara and, after it was liberated, Baghdad. The larger hospitals were gradually provided with the necessary materials and trained staff to become more self-sufficient. Furthermore, mobile units were established which could be rapidly despatched to areas experiencing sudden disease outbreaks.

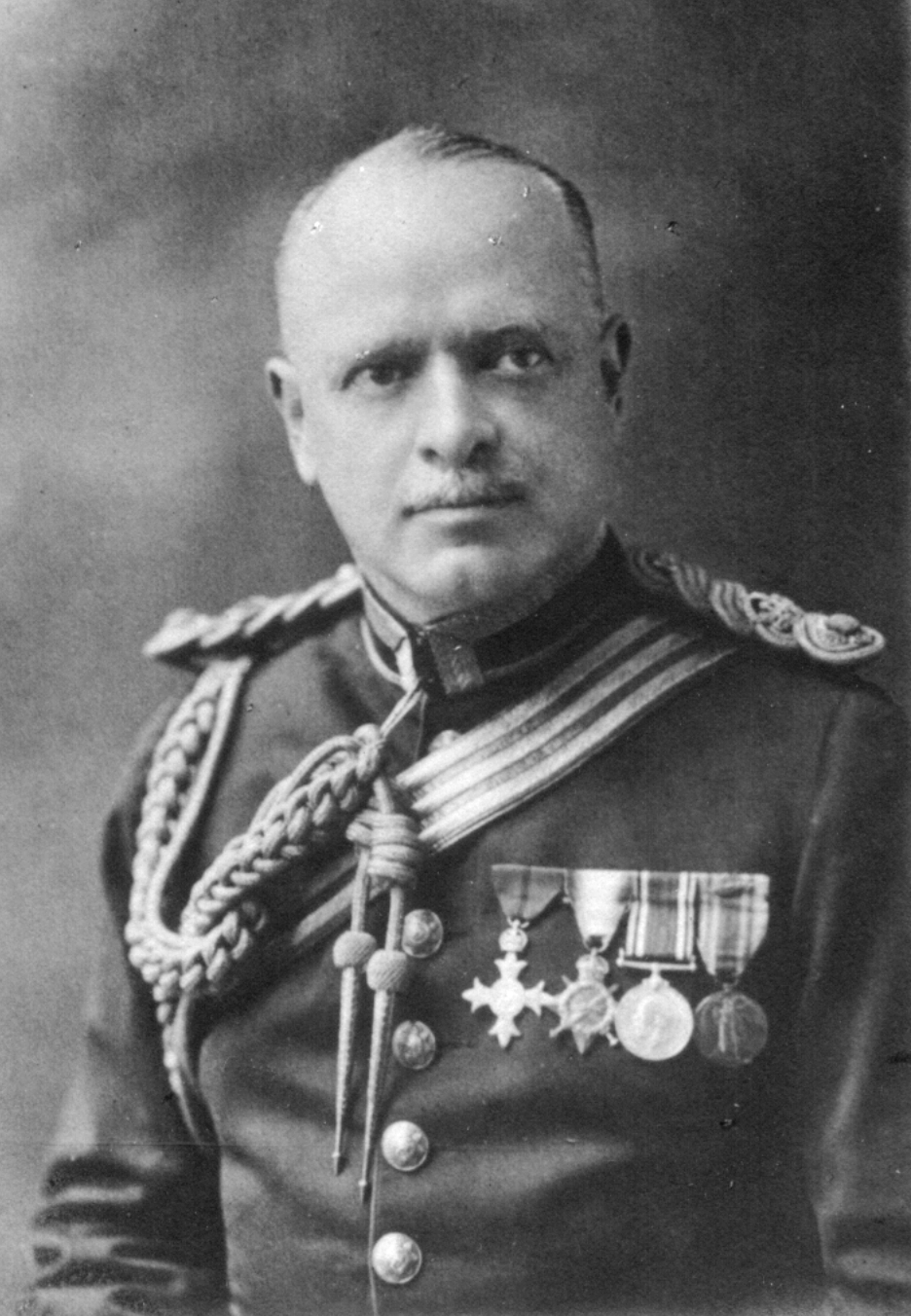
F.P. Mackie, Major, IMS, 1918

Mackie, now Major, was Commanding Officer of the Central Bacteriological Laboratory in Amara from 1916 to 1918, when he took charge of the much larger one in Baghdad, with supervisory responsibilities over all clinical testing units in the city along with those concerned with water quality testing and veterinary pathology.

The principle diseases encountered were enteric fever and dysentery, both bacterial and amoeboid. There were several outbreaks of cholera, in one of which General Sir Stanley Maude (whose forces had captured Baghdad) succumbed. Malaria was also prevalent and there were villages where "practically every child was diseased." Plague epidemics had to be dealt with in all the major cities.

In a 1919 address, Mackie emphasized the importance of close cooperation between pathologists in their labs and physicians on the hospital floor. At the same time, on the basis of his observations in India and Mesopotamia, he stressed that while much of the work in pathology labs was routine, the pathologist's "greatest work is to discover the beginnings of disease and to study the underlying processes..."

Mackie was twice mentioned in dispatches for his war work and the award of O.B.E. was conferred upon him on 3 June 1918.

=== 1920–1931 administrative work ===
In 1920 Mackie was professor of pathology at Calcutta University, but after a year took up the position of Director of the Pasteur Institute in Shillong, Assam, and was simultaneously appointed Honorary Surgeon to the Viceroy (VHS). Two years later, promoted to Lieutenant Colonel, he became Director of the Haffkine Institute in Bombay (previously the Plague Research Laboratory), a position he held until his retirement from the IMS in 1932.

In a letter written in 1923 to his future wife Mary Owen, Mackie summarized his main responsibilities as Director of the Haffkine Institute as (a) overseeing the preparation of an anti-plague vaccine which was sent all over the Eastern world from Cape Town to Japan, about a million doses a year (b) supervision of a Pasteurian section for anti-rabies treatment (c) overseeing collection of snake venom from snakes held at the institute's own snake farm for production of antivenoms (d) conducting his own individual research, e.g. working closely with Neil Hamilton Fairley on schistosomiasis and sprue (e) serving, effectively, as the court of appeal in all matters for the Province as regards epidemiology, pathology etc.

In 1928, Mackie was appointed chairman of the plague committee of the League of Nations and public health commissioner to the Government of India. He repeatedly represented the Government of India at the Office International d'Hygiène Publique between 1919 and 1930 and at the League of Nations between 1926 and 1931. Mackie was President of the tropical diseases section at the centenary meeting of the British Medical Association in 1925 and President of the medical and veterinary section of the Indian Science Congress in 1925.

These administrative jobs doubtless involved much tedious paperwork and attendance at meetings, but they also offered opportunities for travel to interesting places, including trips to distant countries, which he much enjoyed. In 1926, for instance, he visited Japan and China under the auspices of the League of Nations and came away very impressed with the quality and organization of the health care system in Japan, comparing it favourably with health care and staff training in India. One hospital in Osaka "would be credit to any great city in Europe or America." Not so in China: "It may be of some consolation to India to know that she is as far ahead of China in matters of public health as Japan is ahead of India." His travels took him around the world on two separate occasions. In 1942 he recalled that he had "Represented the Government on International Commissions in Paris, Warsaw, Rangoon, Bangkok, Singapore, Tokio and Peking, returning from the last by the Trans-Siberian Railway."

Mackie retired from the IMS after 29 years and returned to England in 1932. As his colleague A.E. Hamerton notes, though he did much important primary research, his major contributions lay in the administrative sphere of tropical hygiene: "Neither fads nor fancies nor self interest obscured his professional or social affairs. He was a good speaker, lucid, balanced and brief.... he was always gay and of ready wit, especially in difficulties." His work in India was recognized in the award of Companion of the Star of India (CSI) in 1932, and he was appointed K.H.S (King's Honorary Surgeon) in the same year. When his Indian colleagues at the Pasteur Institute heard of his receipt of the CSI, they wrote to congratulate him. "We beg respectfully to congratulate you.... We very much wish we could still have you in our midst. A very kind heart peeping through a stern front is what we lovingly remember of you. May your service for India and Mankind have such recognition!"

=== Back in England ===
Soon after leaving India, in 1932, he joined the staff of the London School of Tropical Medicine (now the London Hospital for Tropical Diseases) as pathologist and remained there for five years. He was also lecturer at the University of London. In this period he published a paper on the pathology of the brain in trypanosomiasis, and he continued to collaborate with Hamilton Fairley on a form of sprue occurring in Britain and seemingly distinct from 'tropical sprue' they had worked on earlier.

In 1937 Mackie joined Imperial Airways as Medical Advisor, becoming Chief Medical Officer two years later with the fusion of Imperial and British Airways into the British Overseas Airways Corporation. An obituarist noted that "he surprised his friends by taking, despite his age, the appointment of chief medical officer of the British Overseas Airways Corporation. In this capacity he travelled thousands of miles from one end of Africa to the other, not apparently in any way affected by heat or fatigue, and was able to his great delight to view from the air herds of game in those vast wild regions where, as a young man, he hunted them on foot."

While at BOAC, one of his main preoccupations was to minimize the risk of insect-borne disease transmission by aeroplanes. He journeyed by air to tropical colonies in Africa and Asia to supervise the sanitary requirements of the chain of airports then being established. His particular interest was the prevention of yellow fever, and he introduced thorough fumigation of aircraft against all bloodsucking and disease-carrying insects. In 1942, he wrote that "During his five years with Airways he has (with Mr. Crabtree) effected a method of destroying mosquitoes in aircraft, and has been a persistent advocate for using oxygen in the Corporation's aircraft on high altitude flying. After repeated flying tours he is personally acquainted with almost all stations on the Horseshoe and Trans-African routes."

== Marriages and children ==
Percival Mackie married Gladys Ball in November 1913 at St. Paul's Cathedral, Calcutta, but with the outbreak of war in 1914 the couple saw little of each other. He calculated that in the four years they had been married up to 1917, he and Gladys had spent only 19 months and 19 days together. In April 1920, Gladys gave birth to a son, Lawrence Percival, but the following year she fell seriously ill with multiple sclerosis and had to be taken back to England for treatment. After her death in 1922, Mackie took an extended leave and returned to India via the western route, visiting the United States, Canada (where two of his brothers had settled), Japan, China, Mongolia, Korea, the Philippines, Hong Kong, Singapore, and Burma. His account of this trip has been edited and combined with his photographs in a memoir entitled Far Cathay. In 1926, he married Mary Elizabeth Haddon Owen, daughter of a Lincolnshire solicitor, who bore him two children, Richard Ernest (1927) and George Owen Mackie (1929).

=== Last years and death ===
During the height of the air raids in Bristol during the 1939–45 war, Percival Mackie was an active ARP (air raid precautions) warden and first-aid rescue worker in the streets. He died in a nursing home in Bristol after a series of heart attacks on 15 July 1944, and was buried at Thornbury Cemetery. A.E. Hamerton, who described himself as Mackie's "best friend," suggested to his widow Mary Mackie that "well known & distinguished ... people," friends and former colleagues like Sir Philip Manson-Bahr, Sir Leonard Rogers, J.W.D. Megaw, Sir Neil Hamilton Fairley, and Sir Rickard Christophers should "contribute an obituary note on his career & work."

Appreciations of his life and work duly appeared in The Lancet, 19 August 1944 (co-written by Manson-Bahr and Hamerton); The Times, 19 August 1944; Nature; the British Medical Journal; The Indian Medical Gazette; (vol LXXX, 1945); and the Royal College of Surgeons, which concluded that, "Mackie was one of the most distinguished medical scientists who have served in India, and after retirement from the Indian Medical Service his abilities were in demand at home. His work on plague, relapsing fever, sleeping sickness, kala-azar, enteric dysentery, cholera, schistosomiasis, hydrophobia, and sprue was original and of first rate quality; but his administrative gifts and their contribution to tropical hygiene were of almost higher value."

A scholarship in Mackie's name has been established at Bristol University. The Grübler stains he used for his histological work and for identifying blood parasites are now in the permanent collection of the Royal College of Surgeons Museum in London.
