= Fascinoma =

Fascinoma may refer to:

- Fascinoma, a 1999 album by Jon Hassell
- Fascinoma, a medical slang term
- Fascinoma, an indie/folk band led by singer Alanna Lin
