= Medical slang =

Acronyms and informal terminology

Medical slang is the use of acronyms and informal terminology to describe patients, other healthcare personnel and medical concepts. Some terms are pejorative. In English, medical slang has entered popular culture via television hospital and forensic science dramas such as ER, House M.D., NCIS, Scrubs, and Grey's Anatomy, and through fiction, in books such as The House of God by Samuel Shem (Stephen Joseph Bergman), Bodies by Jed Mercurio, and A Case of Need by Jeffery Hudson (Michael Crichton)

Examples of pejorative language include bagged and tagged for a corpse, a reference to the intake process at a mortuary; donorcycle for motorcycle; and PFO for pissed [drunk] and fell over. Less offensive are the terms blue pipes for veins; cabbage for a heart bypass (coronary artery bypass graft or CABG), and champagne tap for a flawless lumbar puncture, that is, one where erythrocyte count is zero.

== Limitations on use ==
In many countries, facetious or insulting acronyms are now considered unethical and unacceptable, and patients can access their medical records. Medical facilities risk being sued by patients offended by the descriptions. Another reason for the decline is that facetious acronyms could be confused with genuine medical terms and the wrong treatment administered.

In one of his annual reports (related by the BBC), medical slang collector Adam Fox cited an example where a practitioner had entered “TTFO”, meaning “told to fuck off”, on a patient’s chart. When questioned about the chart entry, the practitioner said that the initials stood for “to take fluids orally.”

Today, medical slang tends to be restricted to oral use and to informal notes or e-mails which do not form part of a patient’s formal records. It may also be used among medical staff outside of the hospital. It is not found on patients’ charts and, due to growing awareness of medical slang, often not used in front of patients themselves.

== Non-English ==
Although online medical slang dictionaries are primarily from English-speaking countries, non-English medical slang has been collected by Fox from elsewhere. Brazilian medical slang includes PIMBA ("Pé Inchado Mulambo Bêbado Atropelado" meaning "swollen-footed, drunk, run-over beggar"), Poliesculhambado (multi-messed-up patient) and Trambiclínica (a "fraudulent clinic" staffed cheaply by medical students).

== Annual round-up ==
There is an annual round-up of the usage of medical slang by British physician Dr. Adam Fox of St Mary's Hospital, London. Fox has spent five years charting more than 200 examples, regional and national terms and the general decline of medical slang. He believes that doctors have become more respectful of patients, which has contributed to the decline. While its use may be declining in the medical profession, several dictionaries of the slang have been compiled on the internet.

== See also ==
- Acronyms in healthcare
- List of medical abbreviations
