= Rajesh Thakker =

Professor of Medicine at the University of Oxford

Rajesh Thakker OBE FRS FMedSci FRCPath FRCPE FRCP
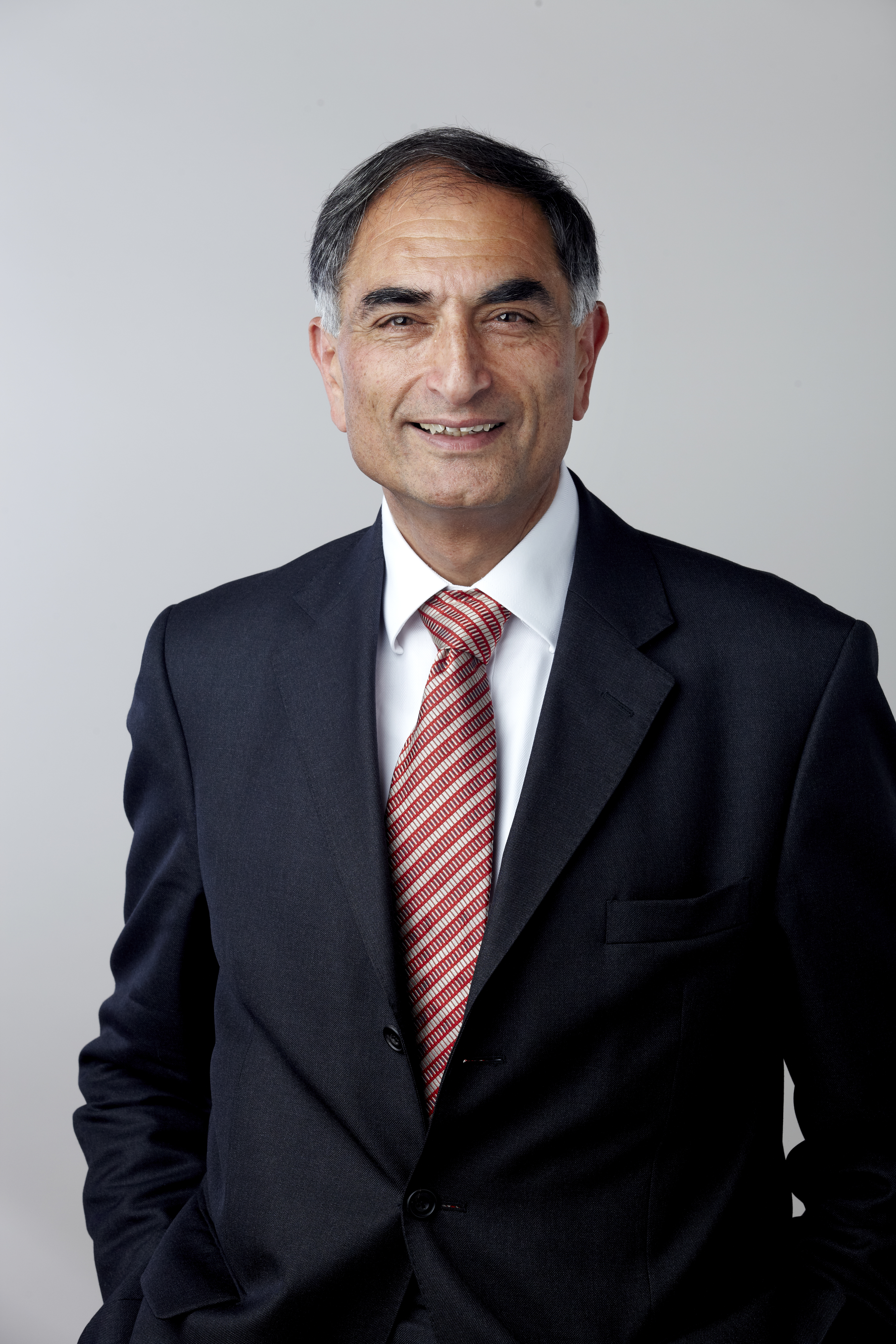
- Thakker in 2014
- Born: Rajesh Vasantlal Thakker; 27 August 1954 (age 72)
- Education: University of Cambridge (MA, MB BChir, MD, ScD)
- Spouse: Julie Clare Magee
- Awards: Raymond Horton-Smith Prize (1994)
- Scientific career
- Fields: Calcium metabolism; Neuroendocrine tumours
- Workplaces: University of Oxford; John Radcliffe Hospital; Churchill Hospital; Middlesex Hospital; Hammersmith Hospital; Northwick Park Hospital
- Website: ocdem.ox.ac.uk/rajesh-thakker

Rajesh Vasantlal Thakker (born 27 August 1954) is May Professor of Medicine in the Nuffield Department of Clinical Medicine at the University of Oxford and a fellow of Somerville College, Oxford. Thakker is also a Consultant physician at the Churchill Hospital and the John Radcliffe Hospital, Principal investigator (PI) at the Oxford Centre for Diabetes, Endocrinology and Metabolism (OCDEM) and was Chairman of the NIHR/MRC Efficacy and Mechanism Evaluation (EME) Board until Spring 2016.

== Education ==
Thakker was educated at Pembroke College, Cambridge, where he was awarded his Master of Arts (MA), Bachelor of Medicine, Bachelor of Surgery (MB BChir), Doctor of Medicine (MD) and Doctor of Science (ScD) degrees. He completed his clinical training at Middlesex Hospital Medical School.

== Research and career ==
Thakker's research investigates neuroendocrine tumours such as multiple endocrine neoplasia type 1 (MEN1) and the molecular basis of disorders of calcium homeostasis. He has supervised nine successful Doctor of Philosophy students and his research has been funded by the Medical Research Council (MRC).

Thakker has edited several books including Genetic and Molecular Biological Aspects of Endocrine Disease, Molecular Genetics of Endocrine Disorders, and Genetics of Bone Biology and Skeletal Disease.

=== Awards and honours ===
Thakker was elected a Fellow of the Royal Society (FRS) in 2014. His nomination reads:

Thakker has made a sustained series of major contributions to endocrinology, particularly parathyroid and renal disorders affecting calcium homeostasis. His research at the basic-science and clinical interface has resulted in seminal gene discoveries and insights into molecular, cellular and physiological mechanisms. These include: identification of functional pathways of calcium-sensing, through characterisation of mutations of the calcium-sensing-receptor, a G-protein-coupled- receptor (GPCR), and its signalling pathway through G-protein-alpha-11-subunit (Gα11) and adaptor-protein-2-sigma-subunit (AP2σ), which regulates GPCR endocytosis; and defining a molecular-based taxonomy of syndromic and non-syndromic hyperparathyroid and hypoparathyroid disorders that has resulted in new pathophysiological insights and advances in diagnosis and treatment.

== Personal life ==
Thakker is married to Julie Clare Magee and has one daughter, Clare Thakker, who has qualified as a doctor from Clare College, Cambridge. He is a school governor at Oxford High School, Oxford.
