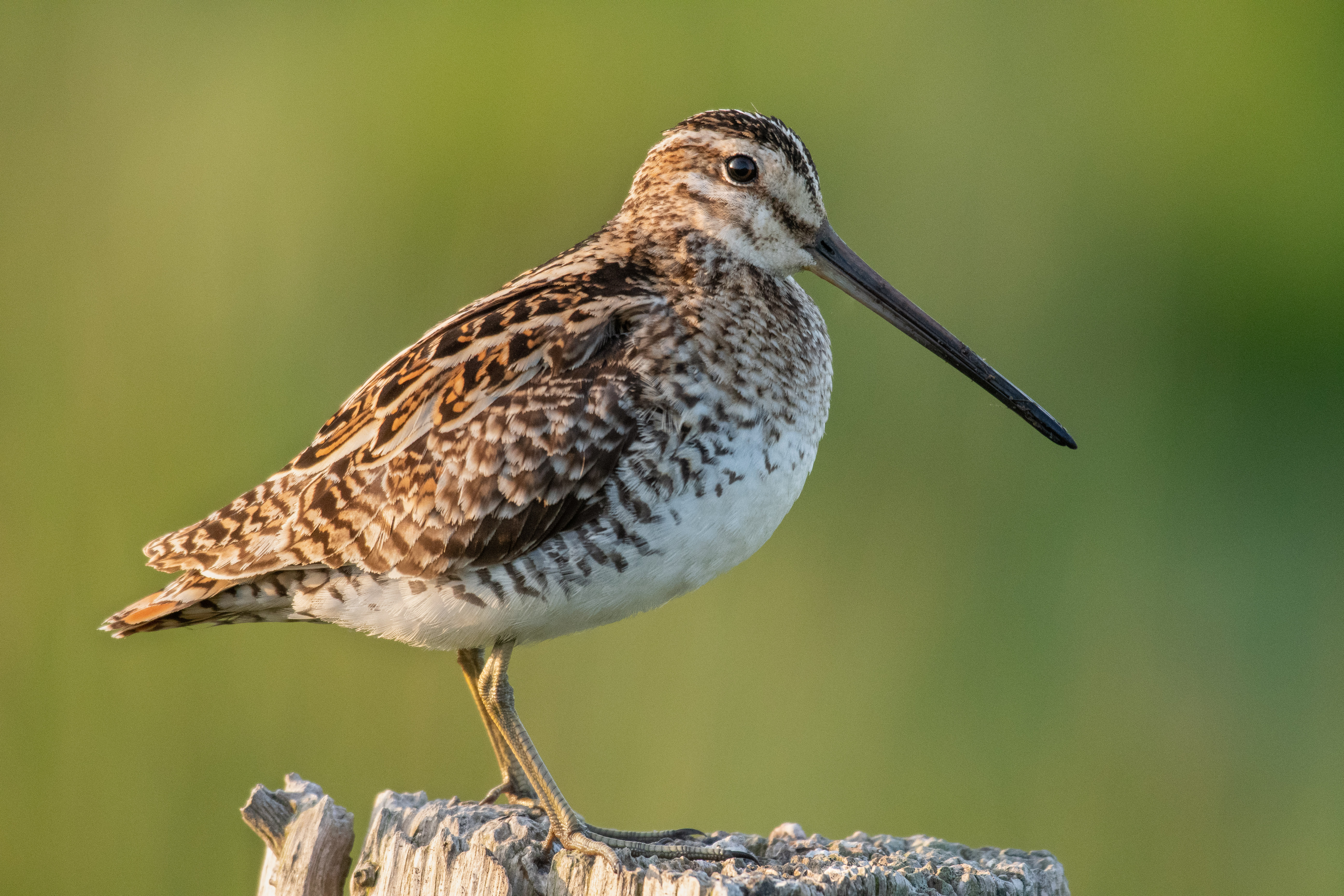
- Nominate G. g. gallinago in Dümmer, Germany

Conservation status
- Least Concern (IUCN 3.1)

Scientific classification
- Kingdom: Animalia
- Phylum: Chordata
- Class: Aves
- Order: Charadriiformes
- Family: Scolopacidae
- Genus: Gallinago
- Species: G. gallinago

Binomial name
- Gallinago gallinago (Linnaeus, 1758)

Subspecies
- Gallinago gallinago faroeensis Gallinago gallinago gallinago
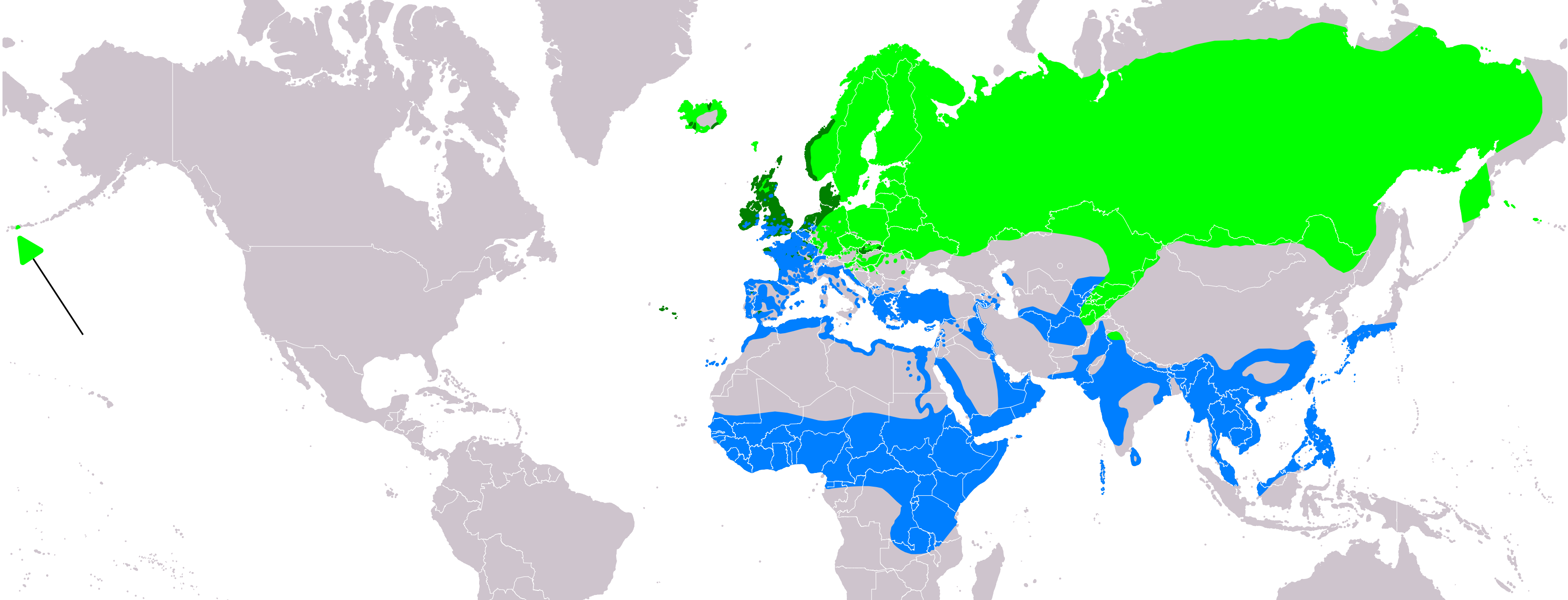
- Range of G. gallinago Breeding Resident Non-breeding

Synonyms
- Scolopax gallinago Linnaeus, 1758; Capella gallinago (Linnaeus, 1758)

Audio
- Calls recorded in Hampshire, England

= Common snipe =

Species of bird

The common snipe (Gallinago gallinago, formerly also known as Gallinago cælestis) is a small, stocky wader native to the Old World, where it breeds in marshes, bogs, tundra and wet meadows. It is usually shy and well-camouflaged, foraging in soft mud mainly for insects and earthworms but also some plant material. During courtship, males perform a "winnowing" display; flying high in circles and then taking shallow dives to produce a "drumming" sound by vibrating the tail feathers.

== Distribution and habitat ==
The breeding habitats are marshes, bogs, tundra and wet meadows throughout the Palearctic. In the north, the distribution limit extends from Iceland over the north of the British Isles and northern Fennoscandia, where it occurs at around 70°N, as well as through European Russia and Siberia. Here it is mostly on the northern edge of the Taiga zone at 71°N, but reaches 74°N on the east coast of the Taymyr Peninsula. In the east it extends to Anadyr, Kamchatka, Bering Island and the Kuril Islands, The southern boundary of the distribution area in Europe runs through northern Portugal, central France, northern Italy, Bulgaria, and Ukraine, with populations in the west being only very scattered. In Asia, the distribution extends south to northern Turkestan, locally to Afghanistan and the Middle East, through the Altai and further to Manchuria and Ussuri. It is migratory, with European birds wintering in southern and western Europe and Africa (south to the Equator), and Asian migrants moving to tropical southern Asia.

== Taxonomy ==
The common snipe was formally described by the Swedish naturalist Carl Linnaeus in 1758 in the tenth edition of his Systema Naturae under the binomial name Scolopax gallinago. The species is now placed with 17 other snipe in the genus Gallinago that was introduced by the French zoologist Mathurin Jacques Brisson in 1760. The name gallinago is Neo-Latin for a woodcock or snipe from Latin gallina, "hen" and the suffix -ago, "resembling".

Two subspecies are recognised:

- Gallinago gallinago faeroeensis (Brehm, CL, 1831) – breeds in Iceland, Faroe Islands, Orkney and Shetland Islands; non-breeding in British Isles
- Gallinago gallinago gallinago (Linnaeus, 1758) – nominate subspecies; breeds in central, north Europe and Asia; non-breeding in west Europe, Africa, Indonesia and Japan

The North American Wilson's snipe was previously considered the same species, and is listed as such in older field guides.

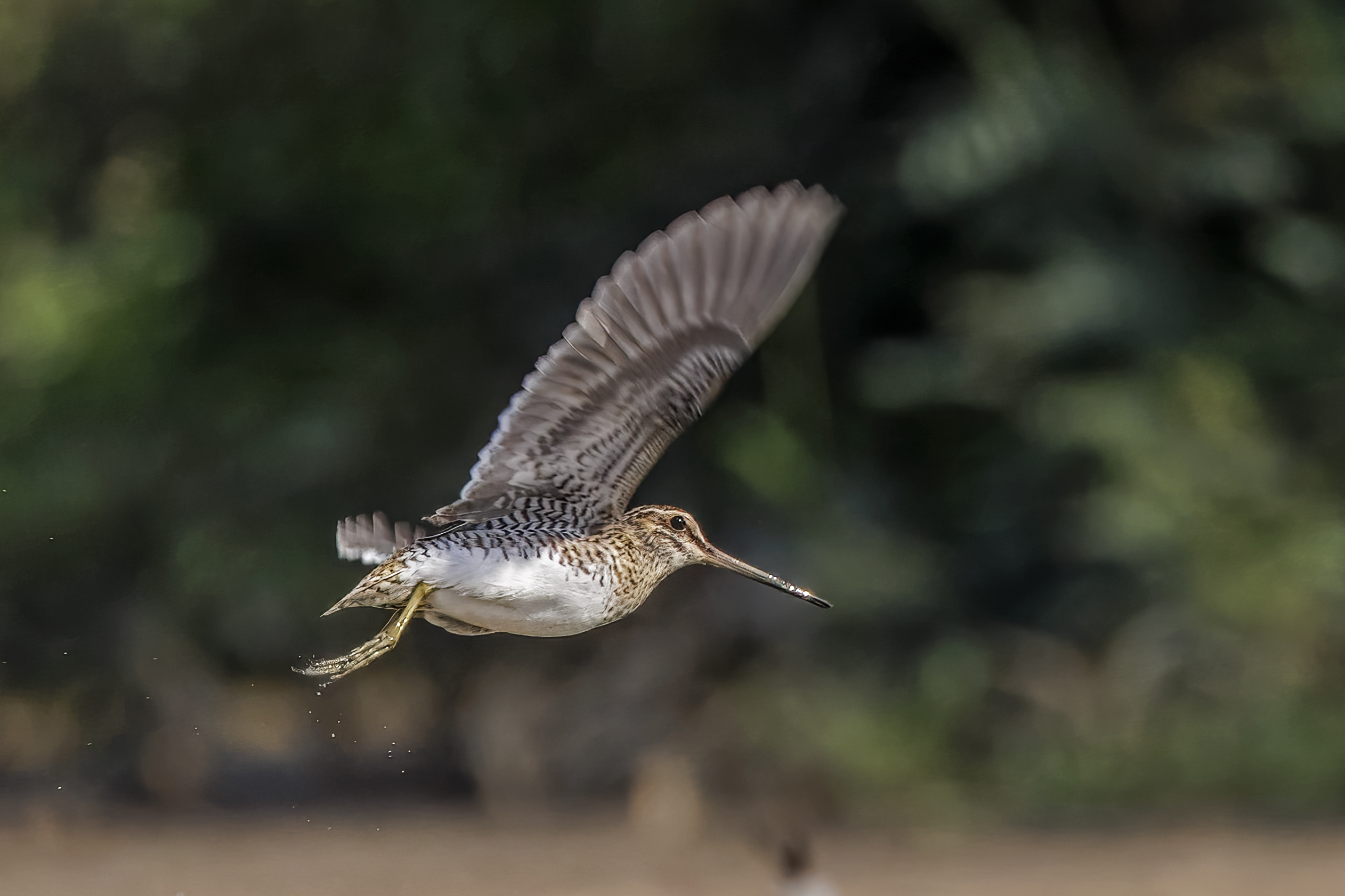
G. g. gallinago, Cambodia

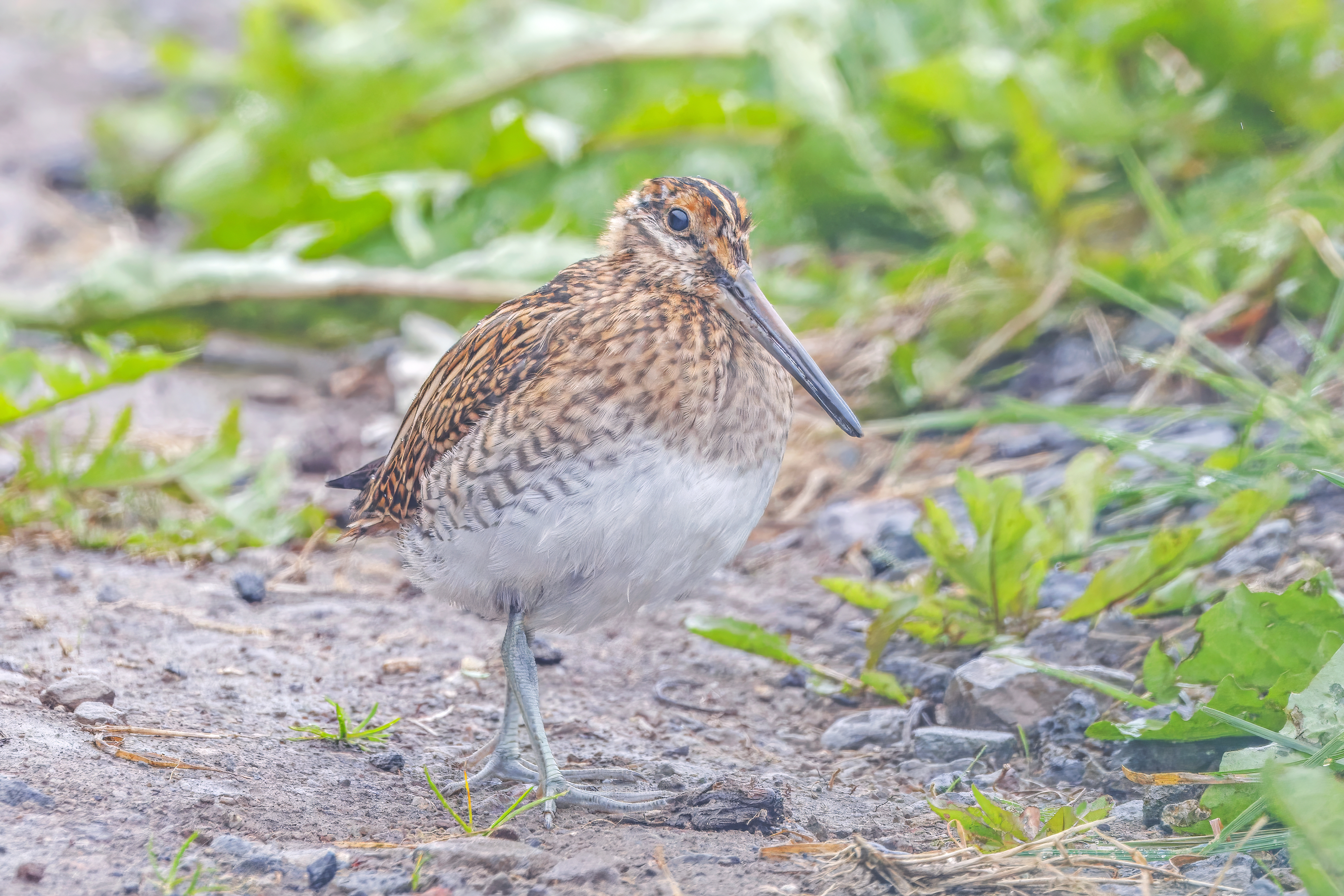
G. g. faeroeensis, Iceland

== Description ==
Common snipe
An example of the "drumming" sound.

Adults are 25–27 cm (9.8–10.6 in) in length with a 44–47 cm (17–19 in) wingspan and a weight of 80–140 g (2.8–4.9 oz) (up to 180 g (6.3 oz) pre-migration). They have short greenish-grey legs and a very long (5.5–7 cm (2.2–2.8 in)) straight dark bill. The body is mottled brown with straw-yellow stripes on top and pale underneath. They have a dark stripe through the eye, with light stripes above and below it. The wings are pointed.

The common snipe is the most widespread of several similar snipes. It most closely resembles the Wilson's snipe (G. delicata) of North America, which was until recently considered to be a subspecies – G. g. delicata – of the common snipe. They differ in the number of tail feathers, with seven pairs in G. gallinago and eight pairs in G. delicata; the North American species also has a slightly thinner white trailing edge to the wings (the white is mostly on the tips of the secondaries). Both species breed in the Aleutian Islands. It is also very similar to the pin-tailed snipe (G. stenura) and Swinhoe's snipe (G. megala) of eastern Asia; identification of these species there is complex.

The subspecies faeroeensis is normally more richly toned on the breast, its upperparts and the head than the nominate gallinago.

== Behaviour ==
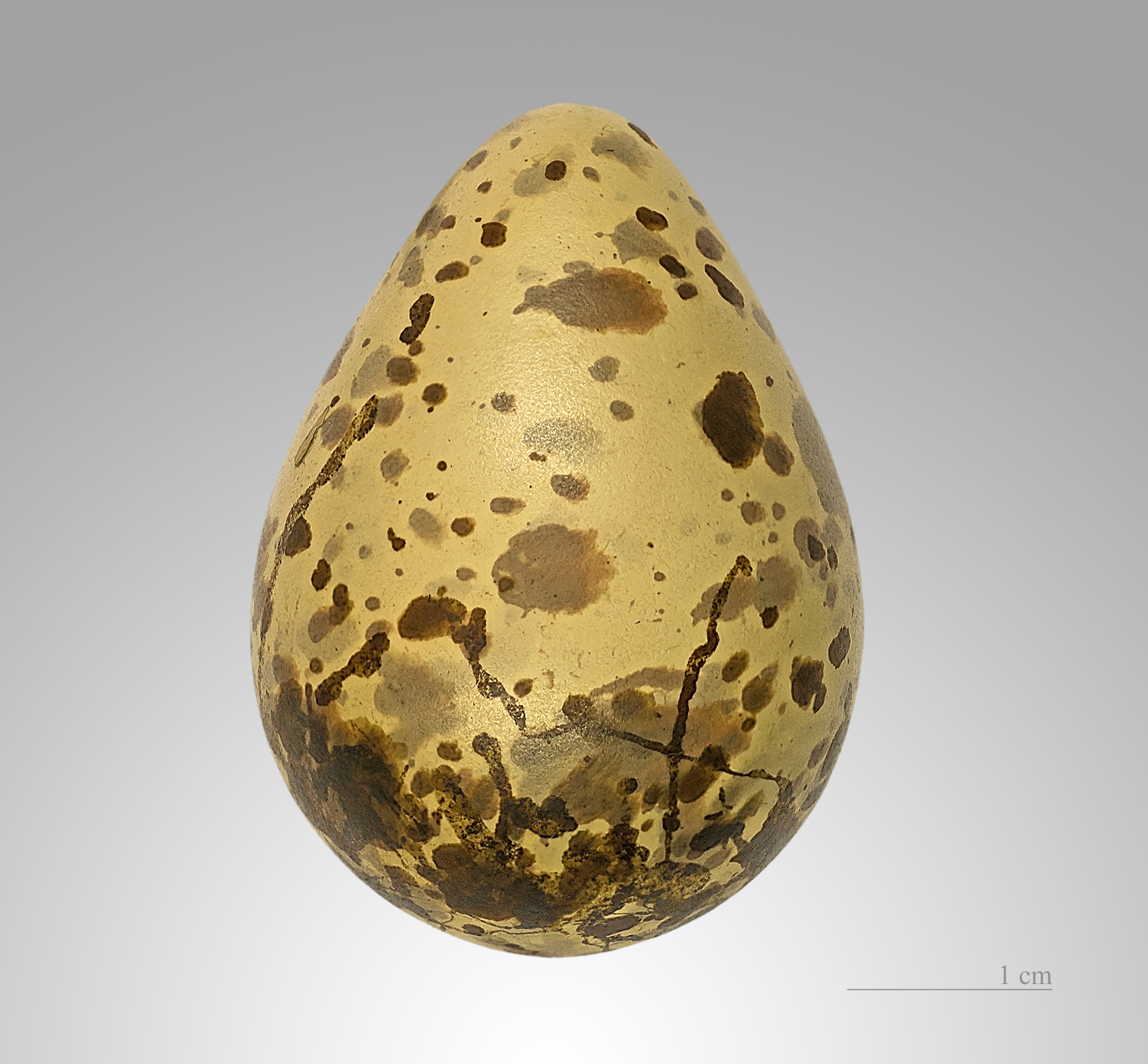
Egg

The common snipe is a well camouflaged bird, it is usually shy and conceals itself close to ground vegetation and flushes only when approached closely. When flushed, they utter a sharp note that sounds like scape, scape and fly off in a series of aerial zig-zags to confuse predators. They forage in soft mud, probing or picking up food by sight. They mainly eat insects and earthworms, also some plant material.

The male performs "winnowing" display during courtship, flying high in circles and then taking shallow dives to produce a "drumming" sound by vibrating its tail feathers. This sound has been compared by others to the bleating of a sheep or goat; hence in many languages the snipe is known by names signifying "flying goat", "heaven's ram", as in Scotland by "heather-bleater" and in Finnish the name taivaanvuohi, "sky goat".

Philip Manson-Bahr is credited with unravelling the mystery of how the snipe creates that unusual breathy sound which is unlike other birdsong. He worked out that the sound was created by placing out two tail feathers at 90 degrees to the direction of flight. When diving these feathers create this unusual sound. He demonstrated this in front of the British Ornithologists Union by inserting two snipe feathers into a cork which he then whirled around his head on a string.

Wing shape does not differ between sedentary and migratory common snipe, suggesting that social selection influences wing shape given this species aerial displays during courtship.

=== Breeding ===
Common snipe nest in a well-hidden location on the ground, laying four eggs of a dark olive colour, blotched and spotted with rich brown, which are incubated by the female for 18–21 days. The freshly hatched young are covered in dark maroon down, variegated with black, white and buff. The young are cared for by both parents, each parent looking after half the brood, with fledging in 10–20 days.

== Conservation ==
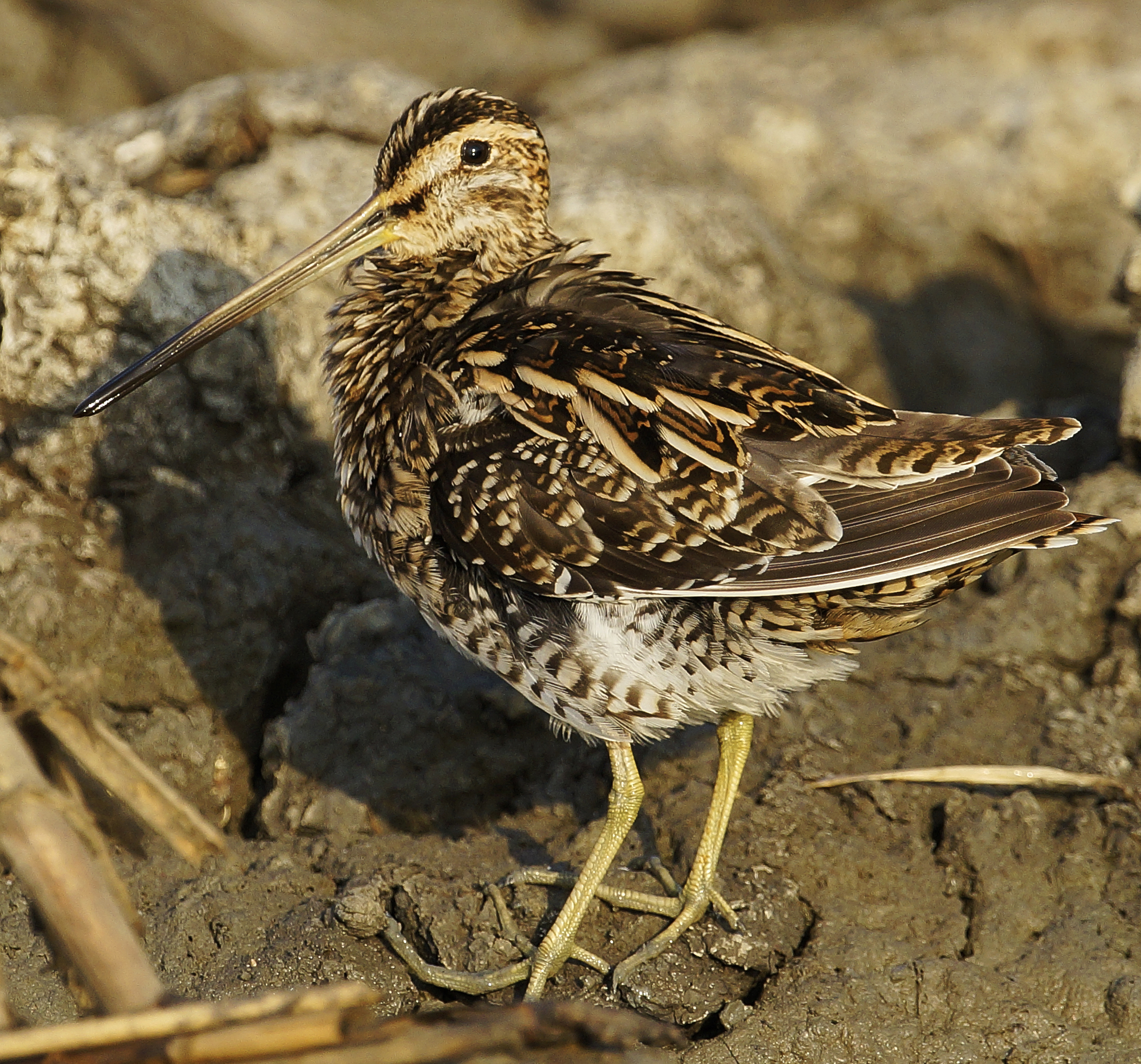
Common Snipe at Chilika, Odisha

Overall, the species is not threatened. Populations on the southern fringes of the breeding range in Europe are however declining with local extinction in some areas (notably in parts of England and Germany), mainly due to field drainage and agricultural intensification.

The Agreement on the Conservation of African-Eurasian Migratory Waterbirds (AEWA) applies to the species.

== History ==
Old folk names include "mire snipe", "horse gowk", "heather bleat", and the variant spelling "snite". See snipe for other aspects of the name.
