= Christine Hamill =

English mathematician (1923–1956)

Christine Mary Hamill (24 July 1923 – 24 March 1956) was an English mathematician who specialised in group theory and finite geometry.

== Education ==
Hamill was one of the four children of English physiologist Philip Hamill. She attended St Paul's Girls' School and the Perse School for Girls. In 1942, she won a scholarship to Newnham College, Cambridge, becoming a wrangler in 1945.

She won a Newnham research fellowship in 1948, and received her Ph.D. at the University of Cambridge in 1951. Her dissertation, The Finite Primitive Collineation Groups which contain Homologies of Period Two, concerned the group-theoretic properties of collineations, geometric transformations preserving straight lines; she also published this material in three journal papers. J. A. Todd, who supervised her research work, observed that "the detailed results contained in her papers" were "of permanent value".

== Career ==
After completing her doctorate, Hamill was appointed to a lectureship in the University of Sheffield. In 1954, she was appointed lecturer in the University College, Ibadan, Nigeria. She died of polio there in 1956, four months before she was to have married.
