= Philip Hamill =

British doctor, teacher

Philip Hamill (15 October 1883 – 3 March 1959) was a British physiologist, physician, and teacher of pharmacology and therapeutics.

== Early life ==
The son of Philip Hamill, an Irish-born civil servant with the Inland Revenue, and his wife Anna Maria Molyneux, Hamill's elder brother, John Molyneux Hamill, O.B.E. (1880–1960), also pursued medicine as a career, serving as a medical officer and Inspector of Foods with the Ministry of Health. Hamill was educated at St. Paul's School, Trinity College, Cambridge (B.A. 1906, M.D. 1913, M.A. 1920; he was awarded the Coutts Trotter Research Studentship and, for his M.D. thesis, the Raymond Horton-Smith Prize), and the University of London (BSc 1906, DSc 1910), entering St Bartholomew's Hospital Medical School in 1909, qualifying MRCS, LRCP in 1910, MRCP in 1912, and FRCP in 1919.

== Career ==
Following qualification, Hamill worked at St Bartholomew's and at other hospitals in posts including demonstrator in Pathology, and in 1916 went to Mesopotamia with the RAMC; he was invalided out after suffering from dysentery and malaria. On his return to London, Hamill established a practice as a physician, working in hospitals in London including the City of London Hospital for Diseases of the Chest and St Andrew's Hospital at Dollis Hill. He was appointed Lecturer in Pharmacology and Therapeutics at St Bartholomew's in 1914, remaining in the post until 1950. Alongside this work he was an examiner at several universities, member of the Medical Trials Committee and secretary to the Pharmacopoeia Committee of the General Medical Council, later being appointed inspector of teaching in pharmacology for the GMC. Hamill joined the Physiological Society in 1908. His published work included the estimation of dissolved oxygen, and studies of the cardiac metabolism of alcohol.

In 1918, Hamill married Louisa Maude, daughter of jeweller, merchant, and director of the British Honey Company Ltd, Ferdinand Francis Zehetmayr, of 1, Linden Villas, St Margaret's, Twickenham, West London (historically Middlesex). They had two sons and two daughters, one of whom was mathematician Christine Hamill (1923–1956). Hamill died 3 March 1959.
