= Max Barrett =

English morbid anatomist and histologist

- Born: Arthur Max Barrett; 28 July 1909; Thaxted, Essex, England
- Died: 11 December 1961 (aged 52); Cambridge, England
- Education: Pembroke College, Cambridge
- Known for: Barrett Room at Addenbrooke's Hospital; Father of Syd Barrett
- Awards: Raymond Horton-Smith Prize (1960)
- Scientific career
- Fields: Medicine (Pathology)
- Workplaces: University of Cambridge; Department of Pathology

Arthur Max Barrett, MD (28 July 1909 – 11 December 1961) was a British morbid anatomist and histologist at the University of Cambridge, and an honorary consulting pathologist to the United Cambridge Hospitals and to the East Anglian Regional Hospital Board. He wrote numerous works, often cited in medical literature. The Barrett Room at Addenbrooke's Hospital is named in his honour, as is a prize for the undergraduate Part II Pathology Tripos at the University of Cambridge. He was the father of Syd Barrett, a founder member of the band Pink Floyd.

== Biography ==
=== Early life ===
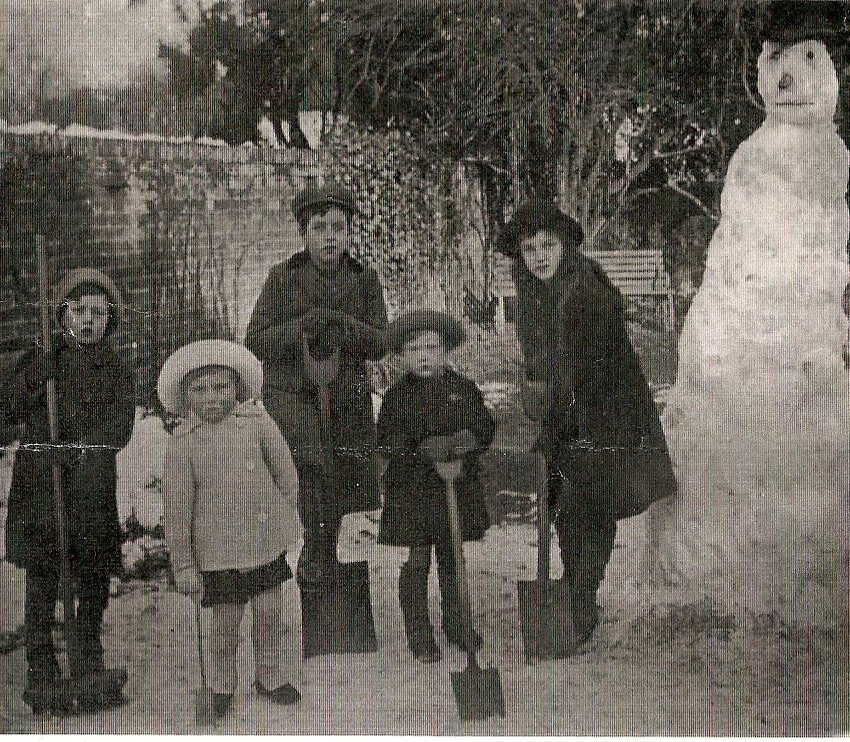
Eric, Keith, Max, Roy and Doreen Barrett

Arthur Max Barrett was born in 1909 in the English town of Thaxted, in Essex to Arthur Samuel Barrett, a grocer and draper, and Alice Mary, daughter of Rev. Charles Ashford, Congregational minister at Thaxted for 19 years, and Ellen, née Garrett, who according to family tradition was a cousin of Elizabeth Garrett Anderson, although research on Syd Barrett's genealogy has not found any relation.

Max Barrett had a religious family background and was educated first at the grammar school of Newport, Essex (now Newport Free Grammar School). When the family had moved to Cambridge he attended the Cambridge and County High School (now Cambridgeshire High School for Boys). Early he was interested in scouting (with the Cambridge County School Troop he became troop leader and gained a King's Scout Badge) as well as in music, aural birding and botany, which improved the expeditions with his sister Doreen for birds and flowers, and inspired his later interests in music and science.

=== Later years ===
Deciding on a career in medicine, in 1927 he won a State Scholarship to Cambridge University, coming up to Pembroke College in 1928. There he obtained a considerable number of awards and honours: a Major Scholarship in 1928; a Schoolbred Scholarship in 1930; a First Class place in the Natural Science Tripos Part I in 1930 and in Part II in 1931 (Part II course in Pathology was introduced in 1925 by Prof. Henry Roy Dean, with whom he first came under influence); a Foundress Scholarship in 1931; five prizes during his clinical training in the London Hospital Medical College (where he went as an entrance scholar in Pathology). He graduated MB BCh in 1934. He won a Raymond Horton-Smith Prize for his MD degree thesis in his later life (submitted in 1960) on estimating the increase in heart weight by quantifying the examination of the arteries. By use of his “undulation index” Barrett took full account of the degree of post-mortem contraction of arteries, a factor which had vitiated so many previous investigations. Barrett’s solution of this problem was a notable advance in angiology, and helped in transferring histological observations from the art of opinion and impression into the exact science of quantitative measurement.

He worked in the wards and laboratories of the London Hospital from 1934 to 1938 and was University Demonstrator in Cambridge from 1938 to 1946, the only one in the Department of Pathology during the war years, having a large part of the teaching responsibility. He was also an examiner for the Institute of Medical and Laboratory Technology, London.

When he returned to Cambridge in 1938 other than teaching he was in the same time actively interested both in the routine pathology services of Addenbrooke's Hospital, and as member of the Cambridge Philharmonic Society as well, where he was Honorary Secretary for more than 20 years, and where "an enviably deep bass" was remembered among his musical abilities. In 1946, when that services were saddled to the university, he became consultant for the hospital as University Morbid Anatomist and Histologist.

Being a keen botanist, he was provided with his own set of keys to the Cambridge University Botanic Garden. He often made histological examinations of the field fungi he carefully preserved and recorded for his collection, and gave some valued opinions on rare fungi during Autumn field meetings of the British Mycological Society.

=== Death and legacy ===
A week before his death at 52 his pathological work continued. Inoperable cancer was diagnosed and Max Barrett died suddenly on 11 December 1961. In his 1961 obituary it was said about him:

He believed in the precise use of language […]. His advice was constantly sought by pathologists in East Anglia and elsewhere, never without profit.

[…] When he spoke at the Faculty Board of Medicine or as secretary of the Degree Committee everyone recognized it as a carefully balanced statement worthy of consideration. […]

His family life was a happy one: tea with the Barretts was fun, for he had imparted to his family his unbounded curiosity, which was, in the view of many friends, his most endearing characteristic.

The youngest of his five children, Roger, later known as Syd, and Rosemary, were 15 and 14 years old respectively. Later a venue in a private ward at the Addenbrooke's Hospital in Cambridge, used for seminars, training, meeting, consulting and conferences, was named Barrett Room in his honour.

== Works ==
The following list of A. M. Barrett's works is taken from his obituary on the official journal of the Pathological Society of Great Britain and Ireland (now The Journal of Pathology) published in January 1964. Here the list is in MLA format. Some supposed minor works like the ones on mycology (study of the fungi) were missing there.

- Barrett, A. M.; Stewart, Halley (1938). "A special form of erythrocyte possessing increased resistance to hypotonic saline". The Journal of Pathology and Bacteriology. 46 (3): 603–618. doi:10.1002/path.1700460319.
- Barrett, A. M. (1941). "The serological diagnosis of glandular fever (infectious mononucleosis): A new technique". Journal of Hygiene. 41 (3): 330–43. doi:10.1017/S0022172400012535. PMC 2199768. PMID 20475599.
- Barrett, A. M.; Cole, L. (1944). "A Case of Tuberculous Pericarditis". Heart. 6 (4): 185–90. doi:10.1136/hrt.6.4.185. PMC 503542. PMID 18609977.
- Barrett, A. M. (1944). "A method for staining sections of bone marrow". The Journal of Pathology and Bacteriology. 56: 133–5. doi:10.1002/path.1700560116.
- Barrett, A. M. (1944). "On the removal of formaldehyde-produced precipitate from sections". The Journal of Pathology and Bacteriology. 56: 135–6. doi:10.1002/path.1700560117.
- Bowen, WH; Barrett, AM (1946). "A case of anuria". The Clinical Journal. 75: 52–5. PMID 21019000.
- Barrett, AM; Cole, L (1946). "Pulmonary Vascular Sclerosis with Right Ventricular Failure". British Heart Journal. 8 (2): 76–82. doi:10.1136/hrt.8.2.76. PMC 480996. PMID 18610031.
- Needham, DM; Cohen, JA; Barrett, AM (1947). "The mechanism of damage to the bone marrow in systemic poisoning with mustard gas". The Biochemical Journal. 41 (4): 631–9. doi:10.1042/bj0410631. PMC 1258550. PMID 16748227.
- McCance, RA; Barrett, AM (1951). "Studies of undernutrition, Wuppertal 1946-9. III. The effect of undernutrition on the skin". Special Report Series. 275: 83–96. PMID 14866590.
- McCance, RA; Dean, RF; Barrett, AM (1951). "Studies of undernutrition, Wuppertal 1946-9. VI. Enlargement of the parotid glands". Special Report Series. 275: 135–9. PMID 14866593.
- Barrett, AM; Gairdner, D; McFarlan, AM (1952). "An outbreak of encephalitis, possibly due to poliomyelitis virus". British Medical Journal. 1 (4772): 1317–22. doi:10.1136/bmj.1.4772.1317. PMC 2023751. PMID 14935244.
- Barrett, A.M. (1954). Gairdner, D. (ed.). "Sudden death in infancy". Recent Advances in Pediatrics. London: 301–20.
- Barrett, AM; Fairweather, DV; McCance, RA; Morrison, AB (1956). "Genetic, clinical, biochemical, and pathological features of hypophosphatasia; based on the study of a family". The Quarterly Journal of Medicine. 25 (100): 523–37. PMID 13379604.
- McCance, RA; Butler, RW; Barrett, AM (1958). "Unexplained destruction of the shaft of the femur in a child". The Journal of Bone and Joint Surgery. British Volume. 40-B (3): 487–93. doi:10.1302/0301-620X.40B3.487. PMID 13575462.
- Barrett, A.M.; Gresham, G.A. (1958). "Acute Streptococcal Myositis". The Lancet. 271 (7016): 347–351. doi:10.1016/S0140-6736(58)90971-1. PMID 13515209.
- Coombs, R.R.A; McLaughlan, P (1982). "The Enigma of Cot Death: Is the Modified-Anaphylaxis Hypothesis an Explanation for Some Cases?". The Lancet. 319 (8286): 1388–1389. doi:10.1016/S0140-6736(82)92503-X. PMID 6123681. S2CID 19243012.
- Parish, W.E.; Barrett, A.M.; Coombs, R.R.A.; Gunther, Mavis; Camps, Francise (1960). "Hypersensitivity to Milk and Sudden Death in Infancy". The Lancet. 276 (7160): 1106–10. doi:10.1016/S0140-6736(60)92187-5. PMID 13732812.
- Fairbank, T. J.; Barrett, A. M. (1961). "Vastus intermedius contracture in early childhood: Case report in identical twins". The Journal of Bone and Joint Surgery. British Volume. 43-B (2): 326–34. doi:10.1302/0301-620x.43b2.326.
- Barrett, A. M. (1963). "Arterial measurements in the interpretation of cardiomegaly at necropsy: Cardiac hypertrophy and myocardial infarction". The Journal of Pathology and Bacteriology. 86: 9–20. doi:10.1002/path.1700860103. PMID 13969522.
