= Percival Horton-Smith Hartley =

English physician (1867-1952)

Sir Percival Horton-Smith Hartley CVO FRCP (né Horton-Smith; 2 December 1867 – 30 June 1952) was an English physician and authority on tuberculosis.

== Early life and education ==
Hartley was born Percival Hubert Graham Horton-Smith in Paddington, the eldest son of barrister Raymond Horton-Smith, K.C. He was educated at Marlborough College and St John's College, Cambridge, where he was a Foundation Scholar. He studied medicine at St Bartholomew's Hospital in London, in Paris, and in Vienna. In 1893, he graduated M.A., M.B., and B.Ch., and earned his M.D. in 1896.

== Rowing ==
While an undergraduate at St John's College, Cambridge Hartley rowed in the Boat Race, stroking Cambridge to victory for three successive years 1920-22.

== Career ==
In 1906, Hartley was appointed assistant physician to St Bartholomew's, and was full physician from 1920 until 1932. He was also physician to the Brompton Hospital and to Daneswood Sanatorium, and had formerly been assistant physician to the Metropolitan Hospital.

Hartley's specialised in diseases of the lungs, particularly tuberculosis. He was co-author with the Sir Richard Douglas Powell of the fifth and sixth editions of the textbook Diseases of the Lungs and Pleurae (1911 and 1921). As part of his research on lung diseases, he carried out extensive research and articles on rowers.

== Honours ==
Hartley was elected a Member of the Royal College of Physicians in 1893 and a Fellow in 1899. He was appointed a Member of the Royal Victorian Order in 1906 and promoted to Commander of the Order (CVO) in 1912 for his work at the King Edward VII Sanatorium. He was knighted in the 1921 New Year Honours.

== Personal life and death ==
In 1895, he married Josephine, the only daughter and heiress of Lieutenant-Colonel Joseph Hartley, whose name he assumed in 1904. They had a son, Percival Hubert, and a daughter, Audrey Gwendolen.

He died in hospital in London, age of 84.
