= Stanley Shaldon =

British nephrologist (1931–2013)

Stanley Shaldon (8 November 1931 – 20 December 2013) was a British nephrologist who pioneered several techniques in haemodialysis, including venous access, reuse of dialysis machines, and home haemodialysis.

== Life and career ==
Shaldon was born in 1931 in London into a Sephardic Jewish family; the family name was changed from Schlaff to Shaldon in 1943 during the Second World War. He attended University College School before studying medicine at Queens' College, Cambridge and Middlesex Hospital, completing his studies in 1955. He trained in internal medicine at Middlesex Hospital and Hammersmith Hospital, and from 1957 to 1959 he served at a military hospital in Lagos, Nigeria as a medical specialist.

Upon his return to the UK from Lagos, Shaldon studied cardiac catheterisation techniques under Sir John McMichael and wrote a Doctor of Medicine thesis on the splanchnic circulation. His thesis was supervised by Dame Sheila Sherlock and won Cambridge's Raymond Horton-Smith Prize. Shaldon would go on to work with Sherlock for six years from 1960 at the Royal Free Hospital, London, after Sherlock appointed him a lecturer in medicine and the head of a new nephrology unit. Shaldon pioneered the use of haemodialysis to manage renal failure, by designing central venous catheters that could remain in situ within a patient's femoral vein to allow daily dialysis sessions; these were known at the time as "Shaldon catheters". This invention made chronic haemodialysis feasible and established the thrice-weekly haemodialysis routine that remains standard practice. He also promoted the reuse of dialysis machines, which upset manufacturers, as well as home haemodialysis, allowing patients to self-dialyse at home. He left the Royal Free Hospital in 1966 to establish the National Kidney Centre in London, where chronic haemodialysis patients were trained in home dialysis. He later left the UK for mainland Europe and the United States, working throughout France, Germany and Sweden at various centres.

Shaldon was one of the founders of the European Renal Association, and received their ERA-EDTA Award in 2011. He authored more than 350 publications over the course of his career. In his retirement, he settled in Monaco, where he died in 2013.
