= Raymond Horton-Smith Prize =

The Raymond Horton-Smith Prize is a prize awarded by the School of Clinical Medicine, University of Cambridge for the best thesis presented for MD degree during the academical year. Known as the prize for the best MD of the year, it should be awarded annually but from time to time it has not been awarded for some years. Often the prize has been considered to have a high prestige value since it has encouraged the Doctor of Medicine graduates (MD) of the world-renowned university to write the best thesis among them.

== Founder ==
Richard Horton Horton-Smith, MA, KC (4 December 1831 – 2 November 1919) was a barrister and a Masonic Lodge Officer. Before to be a student and later a Fellow at St John's College, Cambridge, he attended also the University College School and the University College in London. His studies was about classics and law, becoming Classical Lecturer at King's College London. At the Lincoln's Inn, London, he was called to the Bar in 1859, becoming Queen's Counsel (QC) in 1877, Bencher in 1881, Trustee in 1884, Governor of Tancred's Charities in 1889, and Treasurer in 1903. He was member and officer of many Masonic Lodges (the Scientific Lodge, Cambridge, was his first one in 1856), becoming Life Governor of the Royal Masonic Benevolent Institution, and also founding a lodge in 1893 (the Chancery Bar Lodge). He obtained his highest rank of Past Grand Registrar of England in 1898.

He was author of many books and articles (with John Peter De Gex he wrote the book Arrangements between Debtors and Creditors under the Bankruptcy Act, 1861) and was also Honorable Counsel to the Royal Philharmonic Society, Director of the Royal Academy of Music, and vice-president of the Bar Musical Society.

He had three sons and two daughters. His third son Raymond John Horton-Smith (16 March 1873 – 8 Oct 1899), who studied medicine at several universities including the St John's College, Cambridge, gaining MB BCh, MA, MRCS, LRCP and achieving brilliant results (Wainwright Prizeman at University of London), died of tuberculosis at Davos, Switzerland, aged 27. Some months later, in 1900, Richard Horton-Smith found the Raymond Horton-Smith Prize in his honour, communicating to the Council of the Senate (University of Cambridge) his offer of a fund of 500 pounds for his proposed prize, which was approved on 16 March 1900. Later, moneys for the Raymond Horton-Smith Fund would be given also by his son Sir Percival Horton-Smith Hartley, and by his granddaughter Mrs. A. G. Wornum.

== Eligibility and criteria ==
The candidates for the degree of Doctor of Medicine (MD) present their MD Thesis or a dissertation for the MD of the academical year at the University of Cambridge. A committee judges the best thesis or dissertation among the candidates, possibly consulting one independent referee, possibly paying him through a fee approved by the Cambridge University Council.

== Award value ==
The value of the Prize is the net annual income of the Raymond Horton-Smith Fund deducting a possible fee (to pay a referee) and the price to purchase a book selected with the prize-winner but approved by the Vice-Chancellor and to be stamped with the arms of the university and with the Horton-Smith armorial bearings.

== List of recipients ==
The main source is a column in the British Medical Journal titled "Universities and Colleges". To be concise the references include only the PMC ID of the pages where the column appears. Due to the lack of information available in internet the list is incomplete.

- 1901 Walter Langdon-Brown
- 1902 Evan Laming Evans
- 1903 George Hepburne Scott
- 1906 Theodore Thompson
- 1908 T. R. Helliott
- 1909 Henry Hallett Dale
- 1910 R. W. S. Walker
- 1911 Philip Hamill
- 1912 Victor James Woolley
- 1913 Frank Arthur Roper and Francis Shillington Scales
- 1914 Philip Heinrich Bahr (Later Sir Philip Manson-Bahr)
- 1915 Edward Mellanby
- 1916 Ffrangcon Roberts
- 1917 Frederick George Chandler
- 1918 Hamilton Hartridge and Henry Fairley Marris
- 1919 Edgar Douglas Adrian
- 1920 Robert Lauder Mackenzie Wallis
- 1921 Arthur Geoffrey Evans
- 1922 Arthur Beeny Appleton and Howard William Copland Vines
- 1923 Not awarded
- 1924 Meredith Blake Robson Swann
- 1925 Joshua Harold Burn
- 1926 Alexander John Copeland
- 1927 Vincent Brian Wigglesworth
- 1928 Hugh Gainsborough
- 1929 Wilfred Shaw
- 1931 Wilfrid D. Newcomb
- 1933 G. D. Kersley
- 1938 M. L. Rossenheim
- 1939 L. Foulds
- 1942 E. T. C. Spooner
- 1943 Not awarded
- 1945 F. T. G. Prunty
- 1946 E. E. Pochin
- 1948 David Vérel
- 1949 John Rupert Squire
- 1950 Anthony Guy Everson Pearse
- 1951 Hugh Reginald Jolly
- 1952 David Robertson Smith and James Paget Henry
- 1953 John Perrin and Ernest Keith Westlake
- 1954 P. A. G. Monro
- 1955 Edwin Melville Mack Besterman
- 1956 Ian Michael Pudsey Dawson
- 1957 T. S. L. Beswick
- 1959 J. H. Angel
- 1960 Arthur Max Barrett
- 1961 Stanley Shaldon
- 1963 Richard George Huntsman
- 1964 P. M. Smythe and G. E. Sowton
- 1966 George Robert Fraser
- 1968 John C. T. Church
- 1969 Iain L. Mackenzie
- 1973 J. M. Temperley
- 1974 G. H. Elder
- 1975 John Yudkin
- 1978 Andrew Whitelaw
- 1980 Kent Linton Woods
- 1987 Michael Doherty
- 1990 George William Aylward
- 1991 Robin Gideon Woolfson
- 1994 Rajesh Thakker
- 1997 M. C. English
- 1998 Susan Katherine Clark
- 1999 Adrian Kevin Charles
- 2000 Mark Owen Mccarron
- 2001 N. C. Campbell
- 2005 AGC Sutton
- 2010 I. Stephenson
- 2012 Adam Fox
