= George Owen Mackie =

British-Canadian zoologist (1929–2023)

George O. Mackie
- Born: October 20, 1929; Lincolnshire, England
- Died: August 25, 2023 (aged 93); Victoria, British Columbia, Canada
- Education: University of Oxford
- Spouse: Gillian
- Children: 5
- Scientific career
- Fields: Physiology; Zoology
- Workplaces: University of Victoria; University of Alberta
- Website: sites.google.com/view/mackiefamily/home

George Owen Mackie FRSC FRS (October 20, 1929 – August 25, 2023) was a British–Canadian zoologist who was a professor emeritus of biology at the University of Victoria. Prior to this, he worked at the University of Alberta Department of Zoology, which he left in 1968. Much of his research focused on invertebrate behavioural physiology. He was born in Lincolnshire, England on October 20, 1929, the youngest son of Frederick Percival Mackie. After obtaining a B.A. from the University of Oxford in 1953, he obtained an M.A. and a D. Phil from Oxford in 1957. In 1982, he was made a fellow of the Royal Society of Canada. In 1991, he was made a fellow of the Royal Society of London. Mackie died on August 25, 2023 at the age of 93.

== Career ==
Mackie worked on jellyfish and other marine invertebrates, exploring the role of excitable epithelia as signalling pathways and analysing the neuromuscular basis of behaviour. He and Robert Meech discovered axons in Aglantha that conduct two sorts of action potential: sodium-based in fast swimming and calcium-based in slow. With Sally Leys he found that hexactinellid sponges conduct electrical impulses throughout their bodies, regulating the activity of the flagella that produce the feeding current.
