= Mulowali =

- Village
- Interactive map of Mulowali
- Country: India
- State: Punjab
- District: Gurdaspur
- Tehsil: Dera Baba Nanak
- Region: Majha

Government
  - Type: Panchayat raj
  - Body: Gram panchayat

Area
  - Total: 280 ha (690 acres)

Population (2011)
  - Total: 598; 333/265 ♂/♀
  - Scheduled Castes: 56; 30/26 ♂/♀
  - Total Households: 116

Languages
  - Official: Punjabi
- Time zone: UTC+5:30 (IST)
- Telephone: 01871
- ISO 3166 code: IN-PB
- Website: gurdaspur.nic.in

Mulowali is a village in Dera Baba Nanak in Gurdaspur district of Punjab State, India. It is located 4 kilometres (2.5 mi) from sub-district headquarters and 40 kilometres (25 mi) from district headquarters. The village is administrated by Sarpanch, an elected representative of the village.

== Demography ==
As of 2011, the village has a total number of 116 houses and a population of 598 (including 333 males and 265 females). According to the report published by Census India in 2011, out of the total population of the village, 56 people are from Schedule Caste and the village does not have any Schedule Tribe population so far.

== See also ==
- List of villages in India
