= Volodymyr Vysokovych =

- Високович Володимир Костянтинович, Высокович Владимир Константинович
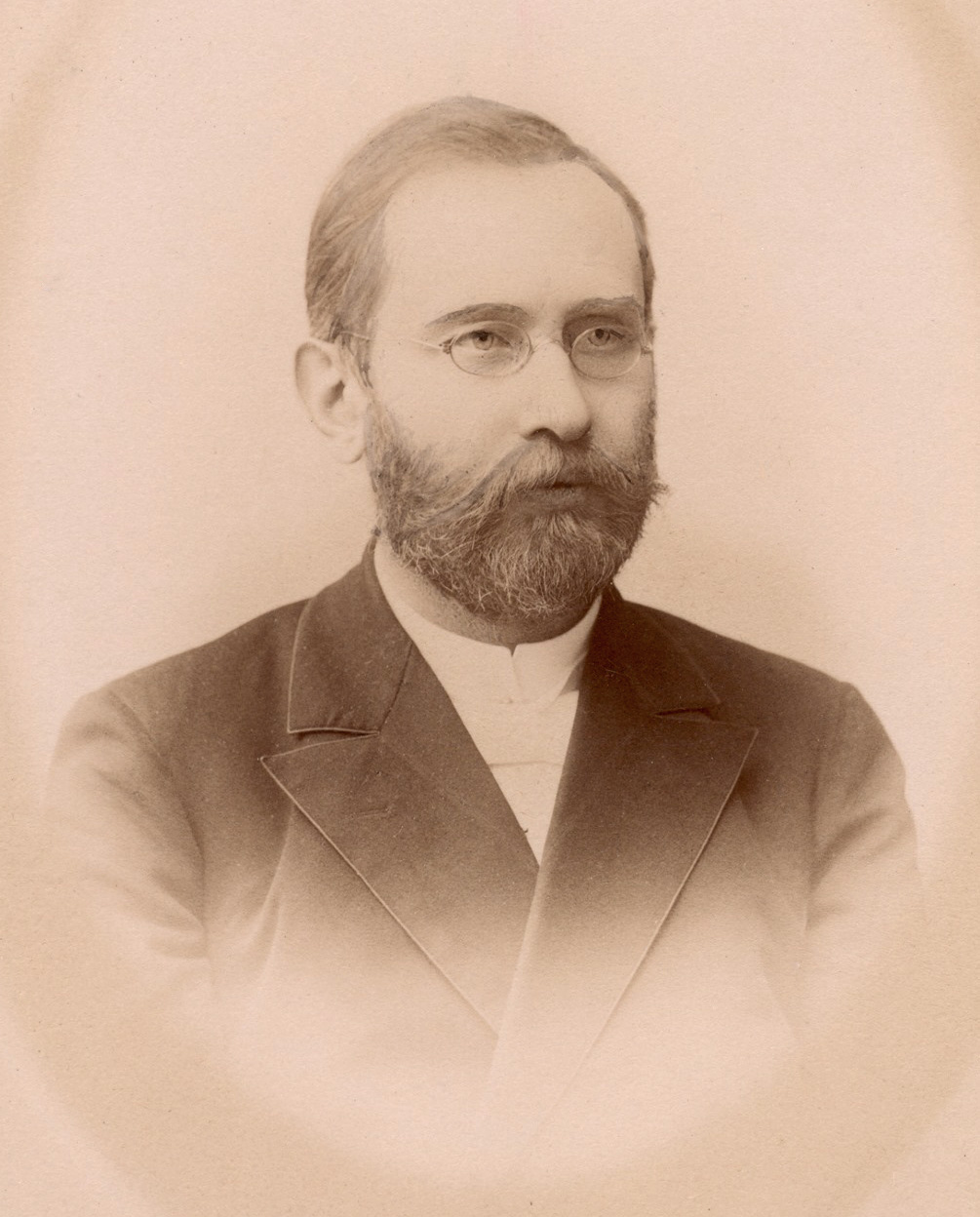
- Born: January 28, 1854; Haisyn, Russian Empire
- Died: May 26, 1912 (aged 58); Kyiv, Russian Empire
- Known for: Bacteriology
- Scientific career
- Fields: bacteriology
- Workplaces: St. Volodymyr Kyiv University

Prof. Volodymyr Kostyantynovych Vysokovych, or (in more usual transcription) Vladimir Konstantinovich Vysokovich (Ukrainian: Володимир Костянтинович Високович, Russian: Владимир Константинович Высокович; January 28, 1854, Haisyn – May 26, 1912, Kyiv), the Head of the Department of Pathologic Anatomy at Medical Faculty of St. Volodymyr Kyiv University, was one of the founders of the Society of Struggle with Infectious Diseases and Kyiv Bacteriological Institute.
