= Philip Manson-Bahr =

English zoologist and physician

Sir Philip Manson-Bahr CMG DSO FRCP
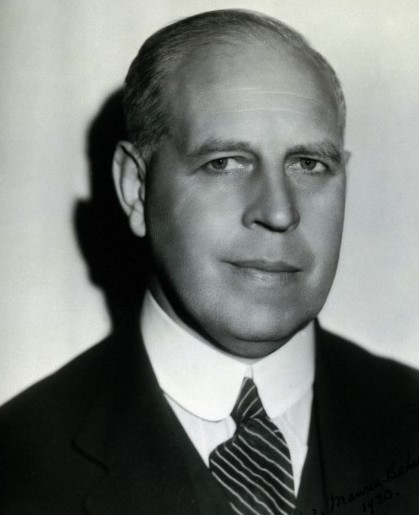
- Manson-Bahr in 1930
- Born: Philip Heinrich Bahr; 26 November 1881; Wavertree, Liverpool, England
- Died: 19 November 1966 (aged 84); Kent, England
- Education: Trinity College, Cambridge
- Spouses: Edith Margaret Manson (m. 1909–1948) Edith Mary Grossmith (m. 1950)
- Children: 5
- Scientific career
- Fields: Zoology, tropical medicine
- Workplaces: Albert Dock Seamen's Hospital; Hospital for Tropical Diseases; London School of Hygiene and Tropical Medicine

Sir Philip Henry Manson-Bahr (born Philip Heinrich Bahr; 26 November 1881 – 19 November 1966) was an English zoologist and physician known for his contributions to tropical medicine. He changed his birth name to Manson-Bahr after marrying Edith Margaret Manson, daughter of the doyen of tropical medicine Sir Patrick Manson. Following his father-in-law, he devoted much of his career to tropical medicine. He was a Consulting Physician and held high offices at the London School of Hygiene & Tropical Medicine and at the London Hospital. He was knighted in 1941.

== Early life and education ==
Manson-Bahr was born at Wavertree, Liverpool, to Louis Friedrich Bahr and Emily Louisa Blessig. He had two sisters, Caroline Louisa Sophia Bahr, who was a one-year senior, and Sophie Catharine Bahr, six years his junior. Originally from the Province of Hanover, Germany, his father moved to Liverpool as a business partner of Anthony & Bernard Schroeder & Co, merchants and brokers. His father eventually became a Vice-Consul for German Empire at Liverpool in 1874, a naturalised British citizen in 1877, and German Consul during 1883-1906. His family lived in a house called Rockville.

Manson-Bahr began his schooling at the Queenbank Preparatory School in Liverpool and continued at Rugby School in Warwickshire. He entered Trinity College, Cambridge and studied the Natural Sciences Tripos, with zoology as his main course. Professor Alfred Newton became a major influence on his lifelong interest in ornithology. He was enrolled in the British Ornithologists' Union in 1904. He took up undergraduate medical training at the London Hospital, earning his degree in 1907. In 1908, he qualified the full MB BChir degree from Cambridge University.

== Career ==
With his medical degree in 1907, Manson-Bahr earned membership of the Royal College of Surgeons and was appointed house physician of the hospital. In 1909, he led Stanley Research Expedition to Fiji to investigate dysentery and filariasis. He worked out the transmission of a filarial worm (Wuchereria species), which he even demonstrated by infecting himself. He demonstrated that the mosquito Aedes pseudoscutellaris was the vector of the parasite in Fiji. He also identified Shigella shigae (now Shigella dysenteriae), a bacterium that causes severe dysentery called shigellosis. In 1912 he spent 14 months in Ceylon (now Sri Lanka) upon an invitation by Tea Planter's Association to investigate tropical sprue. Other physicians had reported that the causative agent was bacterial species. But he correctly identified it as a pathogenic yeast Molinia candida (now Candida albicans).

At the outbreak of World War I, Manson-Bahr joined the British Army as Lieutenant in the Royal Army Medical Corps. He was stationed in Egypt, Palestine and the Dardanelles. He was awarded the Distinguished Service Order in 1917 for his service. He was much involved in eradication of cholera outbreak in Egypt in 1918 and pellagra among prisoners of war. After the war ended in 1919, he joined the Albert Dock Seamen's Hospital and then transferred to the Hospital for the London School of Tropical Medicine. He was also a lecturer at the London School of Hygiene and Tropical Medicine. He remained as Consultant Physician to the Colonial Office and the Crown Agents from 1927 to 1947. Between 1937 and 1947 he also served as Director of the Department of Clinical Tropical Medicine.

== Snipe ==
Manson-Bahr is credited with unravelling the mystery of how the Common snipe creates its drumming sound which is unlike other birdsong. He worked out that the sound was created by placing out two tail feathers at 90 degrees to the direction of flight. When diving these feathers create this unusual sound. He demonstrated this in front of the British Ornithologists Union by inserting two snipe feathers into a cork which he then whirled around his head on a string.

== Manson's Tropical Diseases and change of name ==
Manson-Bahr edited Manson's Tropical Diseases from the seventh edition in 1921 through 15th edition in 1960. (Originally titled Tropical Diseases: A Manual of Diseases of Warm Climate, a standard textbook in tropical medicine, it is still in print, and as of 2014, running its 23rd edition.) It was from this contribution that he was asked by Sir Patrick Manson to change his name.

== Personal life ==
Manson-Bahr married Edith Margaret Manson (1879–1948), daughter of Patrick Manson, from whom he adopted his surname. They met when he joined the London Hospital as house physician in 1907. They got married in 1909 in London. They had five children:

1. Patricia Emily Manson-Bahr (b. 1910)
2. Philip Edmund Clinton Manson-Bahr, MD, (1911–1996), a respected Specialist Physician in Colonial Medical Service, East Africa and Fiji; served as Lt. Col. of the Royal Army Medical Corps in World War II; and later Professor of Tropical Medicine at New Orleans Hospital, USA.
3. Elizabeth Mary Manson-Bahr (b. 1913)
4. David Hugh Manson-Bahr, MB, (1916-1941)
5. Mary Manson-Bahr (b. 1921)

After the death of Edith Margaret, Manson-Bahr married Edith Mary Grossmith in 1950. They lived in Edenbridge in Kent, where he spent much of his last days hunting.

== Awards and honours ==
- The Raymond Horton-Smith Prize of Cambridge University in 1913.
- DSO of the British Army in 1917.
- The Bernhard Nocht Medal of the Tropeninstitut, Hamburg in 1937.
- The Mary Kingsley Medal of the Liverpool School of Hygiene and Tropical Medicine in 1949.
- The Brumpt Prize, Paris in 1957.
- He was appointed Companion of the Order of St Michael and St George (CMG) in 1937.
- He was knighted in 1941.
- An Honorary MD of the University of Malaya in 1953.
- President of the Royal Society of Tropical Medicine and Hygiene from 1946 to 1948.
- President of the Medical Society of London in 1946.
- President of the Medical Art Society.
- Chairman of the British Ornithologists' Club during 1950-1953.
- Council of the Zoological Society of London.
- Vice-President of the British Ornithologist's Union between 1961 and 1964.
- A collection of his works A Bibliography of Sir Philip Manson-Bahr, C.M.G., D.S.O., M.D., F.R.C.P., written by A. J. Duggan, was published in 1970.
