= Adam Fox (allergist) =

British pediatric allergist

Professor Adam Fox OBE MA(Hons) Cantab., MSc, BS, DCH, FRCPCH, FHEAm Dip. Allergy OBE
- Citizenship: United Kingdom
- Education: University of Cambridge
- Occupation: Paediatric Allergy Consultant
- Employer: Evelina London Children's Hospital
- Known for: Paediatric allergies
- Awards: Raymond Horton-Smith Prize
- Website: www.allergylondon.com/team/dr-adam-fox/

Adam Fox OBE is a professor of paediatric allergy and a leading voice within the allergy community. In 2018, he was elected as president of the British Society for Allergy and Clinical Immunology (BSACI). He later became chair of the National Allergy Strategy Group (NASG), a coalition of national charities campaigning for improved NHS allergy services.

== Education and career ==
Fox read medicine and neuroscience at the University of Cambridge and completed his clinical training at University College London. Initially, Fox trained as a general paediatrician. However, he decided to specialise in paediatric allergies whilst doing his Master's in clinical paediatrics at Great Ormond St Hospital. Fox took a specialist registrar post at St Mary's Hospital, London, which at the time was the only dedicated paediatric allergy research centre. Here, he became further specialised as a tertiary paediatric allergist.

Fox spent nine years as the clinical lead of Allergy at Guy's & St Thomas' Hospitals, London and a further three years as their clinical director for Specialist ambulatory medicine. He is currently the Commercial Medical Director for the hospital's NHS Foundation Trust.

He helped lead the access of UK patients to treatments such as sublingual immunotherapy, established the largest NHS Children's clinic for this treatment. Fox was the senior author of the International Milk Allergy in Primary Care (iMAP) guideline, published in 2017 and updated in 2019.

In 2012 Cambridge University awarded him the Raymond Horton-Smith Prize for his doctoral thesis on peanut allergies,

In 2018, the British Society of Clinical Immunology elected Fox as their president - a position he held until 2021. After which he took on the role of Chair of the National Allergy Strategy Group from July 2022. As part of this, he jointly chairs the Expert Advisory Group for Allergy with the Department of Health & Social Care and is lead for the National Allergy Strategy.

In June 2025, Fox was awarded an OBE in the King’s Birthday Honours List 2025 for his outstanding contribution to Paediatric Allergy.

In November 2025, Fox was named in Tatler’s exclusive list of top UK Doctors for 2026.

== Awards ==
- Raymond Horton-Smith Prize 2011 - 2012
- National Clinical Excellence Award, 2020
- William Frankland Award, 2015
- King’s Birthday Honours List, awarded an OBE or his outstanding contribution to Paediatric Allergy, 2025

== Selected publications ==
- Ludman S, Shah N, Fox AT. Managing Cow's Milk Allergy in Children. British Medical Journal 2013;347:f5424.
- Anagnostou K, Stiefel G, Brough HE, Du Toit G, Lack G, Fox AT. Active Management of Food Allergy – an emerging concept. Archives of Disease in Childhood 2015 Apr;100(4):386-90.
- Fox AT, Sasieni P, du Toit G, Syed H, Lack G. Household Peanut Consumption as a risk factor for the development of peanut allergy. Journal of Allergy and Clinical Immunology.' 2009 Feb;123(2):417-23.
- Fox AT, Kaymakcalan H, Perkin M, du Toit G, Lack G. Changes in peanut allergy prevalence in different ethnic groups in 2 time periods. Journal of Allergy and Clinical Immunology 2015 Feb;135(2):580-2.
- Fox AT, Brown T, Walsh J, Venter C, Meyer R, Nowak-Wegrzyn A, Levin M, Spawls H, Beatson J, Lovis M-T, Vieira MC, Fleischer D. An Update to the Milk Allergy in Primary Care guideline. Clinical and Translational Allergy 2019.
- Du Toit G, Katz Y, Sasieni P, Mesher D, Maleki SJ, Fisher HR, Fox AT, Turcanu V, Amir T, Zadik-Mnuhin G, Cohen A. Early consumption of peanuts in infancy is associated with a low prevalence of peanut allergy. Journal of Allergy and Clinical Immunology 2008 Nov 1;122(5):984-91. His most cited paper, it has been cited 885 times according to Google Scholar,
