= Haffkine Institute =

Bio-medical research centre in Mumbai, India

Coordinates: 19.0021°N 72.8442°E

The Haffkine Institute for Training, Research and Testing is located in Parel in Mumbai (Bombay), India. It was established on 10 August 1899 by Dr. Waldemar Mordechai Haffkine, as a bacteriology research centre called the "Plague Research Laboratory". It now offers various basic and applied bio-medical science services. The Institute opened a museum on its premises in March 2014 to showcase Haffkine's research and developments in microbiology and chart the history of the institute. The Institute received ISO 9001:2008 certification in 2012.

The Institute now serves as a teaching institution in the field of biomedical sciences and is affiliated to the University of Mumbai for M.Sc (Microbiology, Applied Biology and Organic Chemistry), Ph.D. (Microbiology) and M.D (P.S.M.) degree programs. In addition, the Institute undertakes specialized testing assignments and projects for pharmaceutical and other health-related products. The Institute conducts research in the improvement of the foot-and-mouth disease vaccine, surveillance and microbiological analysis of typhoid, prevalence of drug resistance in bacteria, studies of infections occurring in AIDS patients, and the development of newer chemotherapeutic agents to combat microbial and zoonotic infections.

== History ==
Dr. Waldemar Haffkine, an orthodox Jewish Ukrainian (born: Odessa, Russian Empire) scientist assigned by the Pasteur Institute to work in India, is recognized as the microbiologist who first developed and used vaccines against cholera and bubonic plague. In October 1896, an epidemic of bubonic plague struck Bombay (now Mumbai) and the government asked Haffkine to help. He embarked upon the development of a vaccine in a makeshift laboratory in a corridor of Grant Medical College. In three months of persistent work (one of his assistants experienced a nervous breakdown, two others quit), a form of vaccine was ready for human trials. On 10 January 1897, Haffkine tested it on himself. The vaccines that Haffkine prepared had remarkable results.

Frederick Percival Mackie served as director from 1923–31.

=== Sans Pareil ===
Sans Pareil was once the official residence of the governor of Bombay. This mansion, which was originally a Jesuit chapel, was built as part of the Jesuit monastery on Parel Island in 1673. William Hornby (1771–1784) was the first governor to take up residence at the mansion. The governor's residence moved to its present site on Malabar Hill in 1883 and the property was used by the Bombay Presidency Recorders. Haffkine moved into the building to set up the "Plague Research Laboratory" in 1899, the laboratory being formally opened by the then governor of Bombay, Lord Sandhurst. The Institute was renamed "Bombay Bacteriology Laboratory" in 1906 and finally as "Haffkine Institute" in 1925.
