= Listed buildings in Lancaster, Lancashire (outer areas) =

Lancaster is an unparished area in the City of Lancaster, Lancashire, England. It contains over 330 buildings that are recorded in the National Heritage List for England. Of these, four are listed at Grade I, the highest of the three grades, 24 are at Grade II*, the middle grade, and the others are at Grade II, the lowest grade.

Lancaster has a long history and this is reflected in its listed buildings. The oldest listed structure is a portion of wall from a Roman fort, and Lancaster Castle dates from the middle of the 12th century. The town stands at the lowest crossing of the River Lune, and received its first borough charter in 1193. In addition to being a market town, it became the judicial centre of the county of Lancashire, the castle being converted to serve this purpose in the 18th century. Also in the 18th century, in order to trade with the Americas, St George's Quay, with its warehouses and houses, was developed. Towards the end of that century the Lancaster Canal was built, linking the town with Preston. In the 19th century, railways came to the town, including what is now the West Coast Main Line. During this century some industry, including cotton mills and the manufacture of linoleum, was established but never thrived. There are listed buildings related to all of these aspects of the town's history.

Almost all the listed buildings are constructed in local sandstone. and most have slate roofs. A high proportion of the listed buildings are houses, or originated as houses and were converted for other uses, particularly into shops and offices. An architectural practice was established in the town in 1836 by Edmund Sharpe, and continued in existence for over 100 years with a succession of partners, eventually closing as Austin and Paley in 1944; this practice was responsible for designing many buildings in the town, some of which are listed.

This list includes the listed buildings outside the central part of the area, the boundaries of which are the railway on the west side, the Lancaster Canal on the south and east sides, and to the north, a line passing from west to east through the centre of Quay Meadow.

== Key ==
| Grade | Criteria |
|---|---|
| I | Buildings of exceptional interest, sometimes considered to be internationally important |
| II* | Particularly important buildings of more than special interest |
| II | Buildings of national importance and special interest |

== Buildings ==
| Name and location | Photograph | Date | Notes | Grade |
|---|---|---|---|---|
| Three columns, Storey Avenue; 54.04869°N 2.81225°W | — | c. 1670 | The columns are in Tuscan style, they were originally part of the town hall built in 1670, and were relocated here in the 1920s. They are in sandstone and each column is unfluted with an astragal and an abacus. | II |
| 1 Golgotha, with attached garden walls 54.04251°N 2.78420°W | — | Late 17th century | A roughcast house with a stone-slate roof, in two storeys with a symmetrical three-bay front. The central doorway has a moulded surround and long-and-short jambs, and the windows are mullioned. In front of the cottage is a sandstone wall, about 1 metre (3 ft 3 in) high, enclosing the rectangular garden. | II |
| 20 Hala Road; 54.02754°N 2.79432°W | — | 1698 | A rendered stone house with a slate roof, in three storeys and two bays. The doorway has a moulded surround and a lintel carved with initials and the date. The windows on the front are sashes, and at the rear is a semicircular stair window. | II |
| Scale Hall; 54.05678°N 2.82054°W | | c. 1700 | A small manor house, later used for other purposes, in sandstone with a slate roof. It is in an L-shaped plan, consisting of a main range and a rear wing. There are two storeys, and the main range is symmetrical with five bays. The central doorway is approached up four steps, and has an architrave, a pulvinated frieze and a broken pediment. The windows are sashes with moulded architraves. | II |
| 2 Golgotha, with attached garden walls 54.04253°N 2.78430°W | — | Early 18th century | A roughcast cottage with a composition tiled roof, in two low storeys and two bays. The doorway is in the right bay, and the windows have chamfered surrounds. In front of the cottage is a sandstone wall, about 1 metre (3 ft 3 in) high, enclosing the rectangular garden. | II |
| Gate piers, Scale Hall (east); 54.05674°N 2.82031°W | — | Early 18th century | A pair of gate piers in rusticated sandstone ashlar. Each pier is about 0.5 metres (1 ft 8 in) square and 3 metres (9.8 ft) high. They have a chamfered plinth, a moulded cornice, and a low moulded pyramidal top. | II |
| Gate piers, Scale Hall (southwest); 54.05721°N 2.82142°W | — | Early 18th century | A pair of gate piers in rusticated sandstone ashlar. Each pier is about 0.6 metres (2 ft 0 in) square and 3 metres (9.8 ft) high, and has a chamfered plinth, a moulded cornice, and a rounded top. | II |
| 10 Greaves Drive; 54.03941°N 2.79720°W | — | Mid-18th century | A pair of houses in sandstone with slate roofs in two storeys. The main house has three bays, and to the right is a lower wing of two bays. All the windows are 20th-century casements. | II |
| Brunton's Warehouse (southeastern part); 54.05325°N 2.80483°W | — | Mid-18th century | Originally a warehouse, it was converted into flats in about 1980. The building is in sandstone with a slate roof, and has four storeys and a cellar. There are chamfered quoins, and a central loading slot to which balconies have been added on each floor. The windows have plain surrounds and modern glazing. | II |
| Laburnum Cottage and store 54.02747°N 2.79632°W | — | Mid-18th century | Originally a farmhouse and stable, later used has a house and a store, it is in sandstone, mostly painted, with a Westmorland slate roof. The house is in two storeys, and consists of a central two-bay part, with a lower single bay, set back on each side, that on the right being the former stable. The main part has sash windows, the left wing has casement windows, and the right wing includes a fixed window, a wagon entrance and, at the rear, a loft doorway approached by external steps. | II |
| Peel House; 54.05313°N 2.80468°W | — | Mid-18th century | Originally a warehouse, it was converted into flats in 1980. The building is in sandstone and has a slate roof. It is about 15 metres (49 ft) deep with a gabled face to the road of about 6 metres (20 ft) wide. There are four storeys with an attic and a cellar, and a front of two bays. The glazing is modern, and on the left side is a loading slot, also glazed. | II |
| Tonnage Warehouse; 54.05327°N 2.80480°W | — | Mid-18th century | The warehouse is in sandstone with a slate roof. It has four storeys and a cellar, is about 15 metres (49 ft) deep, and about 6 metres (20 ft) wide on its gabled front. All the openings have plain surrounds. There is a central loading slot, a doorway on the left approached by steps, and sash windows. | II |
| Warehouse on corner of Duke Street; 54.05348°N 2.80507°W | | Mid-18th century | The warehouse was converted into flats in 1994, and is in sandstone with a slate roof and a gable facing the road. It has four storeys with a cellar, and a three-bay front with a central loading slot, now glazed. Flanking this are windows, and in the left bay is a doorway and a crane. There is another loading slot in the left return. | II |
| Warehouse Number 3; 54.05322°N 2.80476°W | — | Mid-18th century | A sandstone warehouse with a slate roof with a gable facing the road, in four storeys above a cellar. The building is about 15 metres (49 ft) deep and has a face about 6 metres (20 ft) wide. In the centre is a loading slot flanked by windows and a doorway. All the openings have plain surrounds. (Note: Street View in October 2014 shows that the warehouse has been restored and converted for domestic use) | II |
| Quay Wall; 54.05313°N 2.80431°W | | 1750–55 | The wall on St George's Quay was built for the Lancaster Port Commission. It is in sandstone with bull-nose coping, and stretches for about 400 metres (1,300 ft). At the southeast end are two slipways and raised parapet walls. | II |
| 25 St George's Quay; 54.05365°N 2.80531°W | | c. 1760 | A sandstone house with a tiled roof, in three storeys with a cellar, and three bays. All the openings have plain surrounds, and the windows are sashes. At the rear are two round-headed windows with Gothick glazing. | II |
| Warehouse on corner of Elm Street; 54.05369°N 2.80536°W | | c. 1760 | The warehouse was converted into flats in about 1986. It is in sandstone, rendered on the side, and with a gabled slate roof. There are three storeys and a cellar, and central loading slot with a balcony on each floor. All the openings have plain surrounds. | II |
| Maritime Museum; 54.05379°N 2.80558°W | | 1763–64 | Originally the custom house, designed by Richard Gillow, it ceased to have this function from 1882, and in 1985 was converted into a maritime museum. The building is in sandstone, partly rendered, and with a hipped slate roof. It has one high storey over a rusticated basement, and a symmetrical façade of five bays. On the front is a portico with four monolithic Ionic columns, four corresponding pilasters behind, and an entablature with a modillion cornice. The windows are sashes and have architraves with pediments. | II* |
| 1–5 Aldcliffe Village; 54.03435°N 2.81584°W | — | Late 18th century | A row of five cottages in sandstone, roughcast at the front and rendered at the rear, and with slate roofs. All the cottages have two storeys, and they contain windows of varying types. | II |
| 23 St George's Quay; 54.05352°N 2.80515°W | | Late 18th century | A house damaged by subsidence, in sandstone with a slate roof. It has three storeys with a cellar, and two narrow bays. The doorway, which is approached by four steps, and the windows, which are 20th-century casements, have plain surrounds. In the ground floor is a blocked cellar opening, and a trap door. | II |
| 29–33 St George's Quay; 54.05416°N 2.80637°W | | Late 18th century | A row of five sandstone houses with slate roofs. They have three storeys, attics and cellars, and each house has a front of two bay. All the openings have plain surrounds, and the doorways are approached by three steps. The windows are a mix of sashes and casements. | II |
| 35 St George's Quay; 54.05427°N 2.80666°W | | Late 18th century | A sandstone warehouse with a slate roof in five storeys with a gable facing the road. It has a rectangular plan, and a central loading slot. The lading slot and the other openings have plain surrounds. | II |
| 36 and 37 St George's Quay; 54.05428°N 2.80676°W | — | Late 18th century | Three sandstone gabled warehouses in three storeys, each with a central loading slot. By the 1970s they were disused. (Note: Street View in October 2014 shows that the warehouses have been restored and converted for domestic use) | II |
| George and Dragon Public House; 54.05359°N 2.80522°W | | Late 18th century | Originally a house, later used as a public house, it is in rendered stone with a slate roof. It has three storeys over cellars, and a front of two bays. In the ground floor is a recessed timber canted bay window and a doorway with a plain surround approached by three steps. The windows in the upper floors are 20th-century casements. | II |
| Lunecliffe Hall; 54.02453°N 2.81255°W | — | Late 18th century | A small country house, later used for other purposes. It is in sandstone with slate roofs, and consists of a main block with extensions to the rear, including a service wing. The main front has two storeys, an attic, cellars, and a symmetrical three-bay front. The central bay is pedimented, and has a semicircular porch with four Tuscan columns, a frieze, a cornice, and a round-headed door with a fanlight. The windows are sashes. | II |
| Three warehouses, St George's Quay; 54.05398°N 2.80588°W | — | Late 18th century | The warehouses were converted in about 1987 to act as offices and an annexe to the Maritime Museum. They are in sandstone with slate roofs. They are in five storeys, and each warehouse has three bays with a central loading slot flanked by windows. There are two gables, one containing a blind Diocletian window. | II |
| Victoria Corn Mill; 54.05301°N 2.80454°W | | Late 18th century | The mill was converted into warehouses, and then into flats; it is in sandstone with slate roofs. The gabled main block has paired central four-storey loading slots flanked by three-storey bays with sash windows. To the right is a gabled three-storey two-bay extension, and to the left is a 20th-century two-storey extension. | II |
| Wagon and Horses Public House; 54.05405°N 2.80607°W | | Late 18th century | Originally three houses and a warehouse, later used as a public house. It is in sandstone with a slate roof, and has three storeys, and a cellar. The public house has five bays, with the former warehouse to the left. All the openings have raised surrounds, and the windows are casements. The former warehouse has a wide opening on the ground floor and altered windows. | II |
| 38–42 Parliament Street; 54.05389°N 2.79496°W | — | c. 1787 | This originated as a toll house for Skerton Bridge and an inn designed by Thomas Harrison. It is in sandstone with slate roofs, and forms a symmetrical structure facing the axis of the bridge. In the centre is the toll house in two storeys and three bays flanked by screen walls leading to two-storey three-bay pavilions with pedimented gables. In the centre of the toll house is a pedimented doorway, and in the upper storey are sash windows and paired engaged Ionic columns, a frieze, and a dentilled cornice. | II* |
| Skerton Bridge; 54.05459°N 2.79661°W | | 1788 | The bridge carries the A6 road over the River Lune. It was designed by Thomas Harrison, and is in sandstone. The bridge consists of five shallow semi-elliptical arches with semicircular cutwaters, above which are niches with pediments and engaged Tuscan columns. The parapet has panels alternating with groups of balusters. It was the first major public bridge in England to have a flat deck. The bridge is also a scheduled monument. | II* |
| Haverbreaks Bridge (No.95); 54.03936°N 2.80920°W | | c. 1797 | The bridge carries Haverbreaks Road over the Lancaster Canal. It is in sandstone, and consists of a single slightly deformed semi-elliptical arch with voussoirs, and a parapet with plain copings. On the south side is an iron pipe. | II |
| Basin Bridge (No.98); 54.04270°N 2.80310°W | | c. 1797 | A roving bridge over the Lancaster Canal, in sandstone and concave in plan. It consists of a single semi-elliptical arch with a triple keystone, and parapets with rounded coping. | II |
| Dolphinlee Bridge (No.105); 54.06159°N 2.78678°W | | c. 1797 | An accommodation bridge over the Lancaster Canal, it is in sandstone, and has a single semi-elliptical arch with a triple keystone, a parapet with rounded coping and rectangular terminals. | II |
| Halton Road Bridge (No. 108); 54.06932°N 2.79127°W | | 1797 | The bridge carries Halton Road over the Lancaster Canal. It is in gritstone and consists of a single arch with alternate blocked voussoirs. The bridge has a solid parapet and a rounded coping. | II |
| Beaumont Hall Bridge (No.109); 54.06771°N 2.79711°W | | 1797 | The bridge carries Green Lane over the Lancaster Canal; it is in sandstone and concave in plan. The bridge has a single semi-elliptical arch with a triple keystone, a parapet with rounded coping and rectangular terminals. | II |
| Hammerton Hall Bridge (No.111); 54.06706°N 2.80793°W | | 1797 | The bridge carries Hammerton Hall Lane over the Lancaster Canal. It is in sandstone, and has a concave plan. The bridge has a single semi-elliptical arch with a triple keystone, a parapet with rounded coping and rectangular terminals. | II |
| Newton Beck Culvert; 54.06034°N 2.78695°W | — | c. 1797 | The culvert carries Newton Beck under the Lancaster Canal. It is in sandstone and consists of a circular tube about 1 metre (3 ft 3 in) in diameter and about 40 metres (130 ft) long. There is a portal at each end with pilasters and curved abutments. The bed of the stream is paved with setts. | II |
| 3–5 Golgotha, with attached garden walls 54.04244°N 2.78399°W | — | c. 1800 | A row of three sandstone cottages, two of which are rendered, with a composition tile roof. They have two storeys at the front and three at the rear, and each cottage has one bay. There is one vertical-rectangular window in each floor, most of which contain top-hung casements. In front of the cottages are a sandstone walls, about 1 metre (3 ft 3 in) high, enclosing the rectangular gardens. | II |
| 7–10 Golgotha; 54.04237°N 2.78384°W | — | c. 1800 | A row of four sandstone cottages with a slate roof, in three storeys. Each cottage has a front of one bay with a doorway to the right and one window to each floor, most of which are modern casements. | II |
| 21 and 22 St George's Quay; 54.05352°N 2.80514°W | | c. 1800 | A pair of sandstone houses with a slate roof, in three storeys with a cellar. Each house has a one-bay front, and the whole has a symmetrical façade, with a central cellar door. The windows are 20th-century casements. | II |
| 34 St George's Quay; 54.05423°N 2.80656°W | | c. 1800 | A sandstone house with a slate roof, in three storeys with cellars and attic, and with a two-bay front. The windows are sashes, and there are two attic dormers. The doorway, to the left, is approached up five steps, and there is a cellar opening below the right window. | II |
| 6 Golgotha, with attached garden walls 54.04239°N 2.78387°W | — | 1800 | A sandstone house with a slate roof, it has three storeys at the front and two storeys at the rear, and s front of one bay. The doorway is on the right, and has a large lintel running to the left over a blocked opening. The windows are casements. The walls surrounding the front garden, about 1 metre (3 ft 3 in) high, are included in the listing. | II |
| Blacksmith's shop 54.04269°N 2.80265°W | — | 1800 | This was built in sandstone with a slate roof for the Lancaster Canal Company and consists of a blacksmith's shop and a dwelling above. There is a stable to the left, and a single-storey workshop at the rear. The main part has a rectangular plan, in two storeys with three bays on each front. There is a central doorway in the upper floor approached by a flight of stone steps. | II |
| Outhouses, Golgotha; 54.04235°N 2.78399°W | — | 1800 | A row of outhouses in sandstone with stone-slate roofs. They are in a long rectangular plan, behind a row of cottages. They are in a single storey, with plain doorways and small square windows. | II |
| Bath House; 54.04963°N 2.79160°W | — | 1803 | The bath house was designed by Joseph Gandy and paid for by public subscription; it was extended in the 19th century, and has been converted for domestic use. The house is in sandstone with a concrete tiled roof, and is in two storeys. The original entry was at the rear, which has three bays, the entrance is covered by the extension. The front facing Bath Street has two bays, and the windows are 20th-century casements. The stone-lined bath is still in situ beneath the floor. | II |
| Blocks 40, 41, 42, 44 and 46, Moor Hospital; 54.04698°N 2.77653°W | | 1811–16 | This was the county lunatic asylum, designed by Thomas Standen, and later extended. It was closed in the 1990s, partly demolished, and the original part converted into flats. The building is in sandstone with slate roofs, and has a U-shaped plan. There is a central five-bay block flanked by five-bay wings. Projecting at right angles to the north from the ends of these are eleven-bay wings. The central block has two storeys a basement and an attic, and the middle three bays form a pedimented portico with Tuscan columns and a Doric entablature with a triglyph frieze. | II* |
| Bowerham House; 54.04291°N 2.79441°W | — | Early 19th century | A sandstone house with a hipped slate roof, in two storeys with a symmetrical west front of three bays. The central doorway has a timber porch and Tuscan pilasters and a cornice. The windows are sashes. | II |
| Dacrelands; 54.05991°N 2.80065°W | | Early 19th century | Originally two houses, later used for other purposes, the building is in sandstone with a hipped slate roof in two storeys. The entrance front contains paired doorways with three unfluted Greek Doric columns and a plain entablature, with a two-storey bay window to the right. The west front has a central bow window. | II |
| Skerton Liberal Club; 54.05472°N 2.79942°W | | Early 19th century | A house, later used as a club, in sandstone with slate roofs that was extended in the later 19th century. The original part, in Neoclassical style, has three storeys and a symmetrical three-bay front. The central Ionic porch has two columns and two pilasters carrying an entablature with a cornice. The extension is in one bay, and all the windows are sashes. | II |
| Lodge, Aldcliffe Hall; 54.03675°N 2.81161°W | — | 1827 | The lodge to the demolished hall is in sandstone with a slate roof, and is in Elizabethan style. It has a single storey, and two bays with a one-bay extension to the right. Features include two pairs of octagonal chimneys, a cross window with decorative glazing, and a datestone. | II |
| Boathouse; 54.04212°N 2.80393°W | | c. 1833 | The boathouse and workshop stand at right angles to the Lancaster Canal. The building has a rectangular plan, splayed at the canal end, in two storeys and seven bays. Between the storeys are 13 slots for the insertion of beams. | II |
| St Luke's Church; 54.05652°N 2.79778°W | | 1833 | The church is in sandstone with a slate roof, and consists of a nave with aisles, a north vestry, and a west tower. The tower is in three stages and has a west doorway, diagonal buttresses, corner pinnacles, and an embattled parapet. The windows are lancets. | II |
| Ryelands House; 54.05690°N 2.80200°W | | 1836 | A large house, later used as a welfare centre, it was enlarged in 1883 by Paley and Austin. It is in sandstone with hipped slate roofs, and is in Neoclassical style. The house has an L-shaped plan, and is in two storeys with a three-storey tower at the north end of the wing. The entrance front of the main block is symmetrical with three bays, and a central Doric porch with four columns and a pediment. The south front has five bays, and most of the windows are sashes. | II |
| Ryelands Lodge; 54.05617°N 2.79976°W | | c. 1837 | The lodge is in sandstone with a hipped slate roof, and in Neoclassical style. It has a single storey and a symmetrical three-bay front. There is a central porch with pilasters, a plain frieze, and a pediment, and this is flanked by sash windows with architraves. | II |
| Nurses' Home; 54.04358°N 2.79839°W | | 1840 | This originated as a railway station and offices by Edwin Gwyther, being the Penny Street terminus of the Lancaster and Preston Junction Railway. It is in sandstone with a hipped slate roof, and has two storeys and five bays. The central bay projects forward under a pediment. On the front is a porch with pairs of Ionic columns and a plain entablature. The windows are sashes. | II |
| Greaves Park; 54.04090°N 2.79458°W | | 1843 | Originally a large villa, subsequently enlarged and used as a school, and then a public house. It is in Tudor style with two storeys and attics, and has an H-shaped plan. The garden front is symmetrical with five bays, the central three bays being recessed, and the outer bays forming cross-wings. The windows are mullioned, and most also have transoms. The wings have two-storey canted bay windows, and there are attic dormers and an oriel window. | II |
| Railway station 54.04880°N 2.80817°W | | 1846 | The railway station was designed by William Tite for the Lancaster and Carlisle Railway Company in Tudor Revival style, and later extended. It is in sandstone with slate roofs. The original building has two storeys and five bays, the outer bays being cross-wings. Ten bays were added to the right in 1852, followed by outbuildings to the left in about 1900. At the extreme right is a three-storey tower with a pyramidal roof. The platform is canopied, and a footbridge leads to an island platform. | II |
| Walls and gateway, Roman Catholic cemetery 54.04690°N 2.79258°W | — | 1849–50 | Designed by E. G. Paley, the walls surrounding three sides of the cemetery and the gateway are in sandstone. The north and east walls have triangular coping. The west wall has rounded coping and contains the gateway, which has two gables and pointed arches. The gates are in timber and iron. | II |
| Royal Grammar School (Old School); 54.04714°N 2.79004°W | | 1851 | The oldest part of the present school was designed by Sharpe and Paley, and extensions were added later in the century by Paley and Austin. It is in sandstone with slate roofs, The main block has two storeys with attics and a basement, and an asymmetrical front of seven bays, with a tower at the left end. There is a four-bay extension to the right and the headmaster's house behind the tower. The main front is gabled, the fifth bay is wider and contains the entrance. This has a doorway with a moulded arch and a hood mould, and above it is an ornate niche containing a statue of Queen Victoria. | II |
| Barracks, White Cross; 54.04448°N 2.79812°W | — | 1854 | The barracks were converted into offices in about 1983. They are in Scottish baronial style, built in sandstone with a slate roof and in two storeys. The front is symmetrical with five recessed bays under a parapet. This is flanked by cross-wings in two storeys with attics, crow-stepped gables with finials, and corner turrets with conical roofs and finials. The windows are mullioned and contain casements. | II |
| Eastern Chapel, Lancaster Cemetery; 54.05030°N 2.77616°W | — | 1854–55 | The Nonconformist mortuary chapel, designed by E. G. Paley, is in sandstone with a slate roof, and is in Gothic Revival style. It has a cruciform plan. Most of the windows are lancets, and there is a wheel window in the east gable. The main gable apex has a cross finial, and there is a poppy head finial on the porch. | II |
| Northern Chapel, Lancaster Cemetery; 54.05084°N 2.77663°W | — | 1854–55 | The Roman Catholic mortuary chapel, designed by E. G. Paley, is in sandstone with a slate roof, and is in Gothic Revival style. It has a rectangular plan with a gabled projection to the north and a gabled porch to the south. The windows are lancets, and there is a cross finial on the east gable. | II |
| Western Chapel, Lancaster Cemetery; 54.05057°N 2.77757°W | — | 1854–55 | The Anglican mortuary chapel, designed by E. G. Paley, is in sandstone with a slate roof, and is in Gothic Revival style. It has a cruciform plan. Most of the windows are lancets, and there is a wheel window in the west gable. The main gable apex has a cross finial, and there is a poppy head finial on the porch. | II |
| Cemetery Lodge; 54.04922°N 2.77934°W | — | 1855 | The lodge was designed by E. G. Paley in Gothic Revival style, and is in sandstone with slate roofs. It is in a T-shaped plan consisting of a range of one storey, and a cross-wing of two storeys, both with attics. There is a canted bay window containing mullioned and transomed windows with trefoil heads; other windows have arched heads and plate tracery. | II |
| Christ Church; 54.04592°N 2.78835°W | | 1855–57 | The church was designed by Henry Martin, and subsequent additions and alterations were made by Paley and Austin and their successors in the practice. It is in sandstone with slate roofs, and consists of a nave with a baptistry, north and south porches, a chancel, a south aisle and south chapel, and a north transept and vestry. At the west end are twin turrets with square bases broaching to octagons, and surmounted by spirelets. | II |
| Lancaster Cathedral; 54.04705°N 2.79387°W | | 1857–59 | The Roman Catholic cathedral originated as a parish church designed by E. G. Paley in Gothic Revival style, and was extended later. It is in sandstone with a slate roof, except for the baptistry, which has a copper roof. The cathedral consists of a nave with aisles and transepts, a chancel with aisles, a semi-octagonal apse and chapels, an octagonal baptistry attached to the north transept, and a northwest steeple. The steeple has a four-stage tower, a stair turret, and a spire, containing three tiers of lucarnes, and rising to a height of 73 metres (240 ft). | II* |
| Cathedral House; 54.04679°N 2.79348°W | | 1857–59 | The presbytery for Lancaster Cathedral was designed by E. G. Paley in Gothic Revival style, and extended in 1895–96 by Austin and Paley. It is in sandstone with slate roofs, and has two storeys with gables. The original range has a two-storey canted bay window. The extension is at right angles and there is a two-storey turret in the angle. The windows are mullioned and some also have transoms. | II |
| Crimea Memorial; 54.05117°N 2.77758°W | — | 1860 | The war memorial in Lancaster Cemetery was designed by E. G. Paley to commemorate those who lost their lives in the Crimean War. It is in carboniferous limestone, and consists of an obelisk on three steps, a square plinth, and a tapering shaft on a square base. At the top of each face of the plinth is a pediment, and on its sides are inscriptions. | II |
| Entrance gateway, Ripley St Thomas School; 54.04020°N 2.79973°W | — | c. 1860 | The gateway is in sandstone, and consists of four piers, two of which flank the central driveway, and the other two the pedestrian entrances. Each pedestrian entrance is through a pointed archway with steep gables and fleur-de-lys finials. The piers have octagonal caps surmounted by poppyhead finials. The gates are in wrought iron. | II |
| 32 Parliament Street; 54.05271°N 2.79599°W | | 1863 | A marble works by E. G. Paley, later used for other purposes. It is in sandstone with a hipped slate roof, in three storeys with a cellar, and has a symmetrical front of five bays. The central doorway has a two-centred arch. The windows in the ground and middle floors have voussoirs of alternating red and yellow sandstone. The windows in the top two floors are paired with marble shafts, those in the top floor being gabled dormers. | II |
| Waggon Works; 54.0599°N 2.7896°W | | 1863–65 | A factory designed by E. G. Paley, later closed and used as a warehouse and offices. It is in sandstone with slate roofs. Along the road is a long range of single-storey workshops, some with roof ventilators. In the centre is a three-stage tower with a high wagon entrance, above which is a row of four round-headed windows. In the top stage are clock faces, and the tower is surmounted by a pyramidal roof with a timber bell-chamber. In the courtyard behind the tower are two-storey offices. | II |
| St Michael's Church; 54.04822°N 2.77632°W | | c. 1866 | This was built as the chapel to Lancaster Moor Hospital, and designed by E. G. Paley in Neo-Norman style. It is in sandstone with a slate roof, and consists of a nave, a west porch, transepts, and an apsidal chancel. The windows are round-headed with alternating red and yellow voussoirs, and in the transepts are rose windows. | II |
| Royal Albert Hospital; 54.03363°N 2.80079°W | | 1868–73 | Designed as a mental hospital by E. G. Paley in Gothic Revival style, it is in sandstone with hipped Coniston slate roofs. The building has a symmetrical plan, and is in two storeys with a basement and attics with dormers. The central block has six bays, flanked by eleven-bay wings containing a three-bay canted projection, and ending in three-bay pavilions. The central block has a triple-arched porch, above which is an oriel window. The block rises to become a three-storey tower with corner turrets and a steep roof containing three tiers of gabled dormers. The building has been converted for use as a college. | II* |
| Christ Church School; 54.04735°N 2.78942°W | — | c. 1870 | A primary school in sandstone with slate roofs. It has two storeys, a cross-wing with three bays to the left and five bays to the right, plus a single-storey porch. There are separate entrances for boys and girls, two dormers, and tall mullioned windows. | II |
| Gateway and lodge, Royal Albert Hospital; 54.03278°N 2.80248°W | | c. 1873 | The gateway and lodge were designed by Paley and Austin in Gothic Revival style. They are in sandstone with a green slate roof. The gateway is in two storeys and consists of a large pointed arch with a smaller pedestrian arch to the right. In the upper storey are three trefoil-headed windows, above which is a hipped roof with finials. To the right of the gateway is a single-storey lodge with a canted bay window. | II |
| St Paul's Church; 54.03369°N 2.79532°W | | 1874 | Designed by Edmund Sharpe, and extended in 1890–91 by Paley, Austin and Paley, the church is built in brick and faced in grindstone with detailing in yellow terracotta. It combines a mixture of Romanesque and Gothic styles. The church consists of a nave with a clerestory, aisles, transepts at the western end, a chancel with an apsidal sanctuary, and a north vestry. The tower has two round-headed windows, a hipped roof with steep gables, each containing a vesica piscis opening, and a lead roof. | II |
| Laurel Bank; 54.04549°N 2.81582°W | — | Late 19th century | A terrace of seven sandstone houses with slate roofs and decorative ridge tiles. Each house has two storeys, an attic, three bays, and a canted bay window some of which have retained cast iron railings. The central house is gabled, the outer houses have hipped roofs, and all but the central house have dormers. The other windows are sashes, some with mullions. | II |
| Royal Albert Farm, Main building 54.03207°N 2.80336°W | — | Late 19th century | The farm building is in sandstone with a green slate roof, and consists of a main range and two wings projecting to the east. The main range has six bays with a cart entrance in the west wall. The north wing has two storeys at its east end and a gable facing the road. The gable end contains an external flight of steps leading to a first floor doorway above which is a canopy. (Note: Street View in October 2014 shows that the main and the ancillary farm buildings have been converted for domestic use) | II |
| Royal Albert Farm, Barn; 54.03240°N 2.80315°W | — | Late 19th century | The barn is in sandstone with a green slate roof. In the centre is a cart entrance with a segmental head, and above it the roof forms a canopy. There are two rows of slit ventilators, and on the north and south walls are pitching holes. | II |
| Royal Albert Farm, Western range 54.03200°N 2.80360°W | — | Late 19th century | The farm building is in sandstone with a green slate roof. It is in a single storey, rising to two storeys towards the south, where there is a round-arched loading door and a projecting gable. To the right are doorways and windows. | II |
| Water closet cubicle (north), St Michael's Church; 54.04827°N 2.77615°W | — | Late 19th century | The cubicle is to the north of the apse of the church, it is in cast iron, and has a rectangular plan. It is constructed with square panels between uprights, three on one side and two on the other. The panels are decorated with interlace patterns and above them is a cornice with cresting. | II |
| Water closet cubicle (west), St Michael's Church; 54.04820°N 2.77671°W | — | Late 19th century | The cubicle is to the south of the west porch of the church, and has a rectangular plan. It is constructed with square panels between uprights, three on one side and two on the other. The panels are decorated with interlace patterns and above them is a cornice with cresting. | II |
| The Knoll; 54.04576°N 2.81411°W | — | 1879 | A large house designed by Hubert Austin for his own use. It is in red brick with some tile hanging and applied timber-framing, and has an irregular plan. The main part is in two storeys, and the entrance is in a projecting wing with a jettied third storey containing an oriel window and surmounted by a bellcote. Elsewhere is a dormer and another oriel window, and on the roof is a viewing platform. | II |
| Gate piers, gates and walls, Williamson Park, Quernmore Road; 54.04358°N 2.78505°W | | 1880 | The gate piers and walls are in sandstone. The piers are square with fluted pilasters, moulded cornices, and caps with fan-like carving. Flanking the piers are pedestrian entrances with semicircular arches, and carved friezes. Outside these are S-shaped walls terminating in piers. The gates are in cast iron. | II |
| Gate piers, gates and walls, Williamson Park, Wyresdale Road; 54.04781°N 2.78146°W | | 1880 | The gate piers and walls are in sandstone. The piers are square with fluted pilasters, moulded cornices, and caps with fan-like carving. Flanking the piers are pedestrian entrances with semicircular arches, and carved friezes. Outside these are S-shaped walls terminating in piers. The gates are in cast iron. | II |
| Lodge, Williamson Park, Wyresdale Road; 54.04782°N 2.78117°W | — | 1880 | The lodge is in sandstone with a slate roof, and is in two storeys. The main part is semi-octagonal with four bays. Set back to the left is a single-storey wing with a hipped roof, and a porch. The windows are sashes. | II |
| Lodge, Williamson Park, Quernmore Road; 54.04351°N 2.78494°W | — | 1880 | The lodge is in sandstone with a slate roof, and is in two storeys. The main part is semi-octagonal with four bays. Set back to the right is a single-storey wing with a hipped roof, and a porch. The windows are sashes. | II |
| Main block, Moor Hospital; 54.04908°N 2.77208°W | | 1882 | This was built as an annex to the County Lunatic Asylum, and was designed by A. W. Kershaw. It is in sandstone with slate roofs, in Gothic Revival style. It consists of a main block in three storeys with a six-storey tower flanked by two ward wings linked by a central spine. The tower has corner pinnacles, and a central protruding porch with pointed arches and corner octagonal pinnacles. On each side of the tower are four bays with sash windows. | II |
| Westbourne House; 54.04473°N 2.81515°W | — | 1882 | A house, later used for other purposes, in rendered concrete with slate roofs. There is a main block with two storeys, cellars, attics and two bays and, to the right, a three-stage tower with a pyramidal roof. On the entrance front is a projecting single-storey porch, and the garden front are two bay windows. | II |
| Wall, gates, gate piers and steps, Lancaster Moor Hospital; 54.04808°N 2.77380°W | — | 1883 | The walls and gate piers are in gritstone and the gates are iron; the gate piers and gates are all ornate. At the entrance from the road there is a central wide gate flanked by pedestrian gates, with four gate piers. Inside these are two flights of steps flanked by walls with ornate posts at the bottom and top. | II |
| Chapel, Ripley St Thomas School; 54.03971°N 2.80050°W | — | 1884-88 | The school chapel, by Paley and Austin in Gothic Revival style, is in sandstone with Westmorland slate roofs. It consists of a nave and chancel under one roof, a south aisle, a transeptal vestry, a northeast stair tower, and a northwest porch. On the roof is an octagonal flèche with a weathervane. | II* |
| Entrance lodge, Ripley St Thomas School; 54.04027°N 2.79977°W | — | 1885 | The lodge, designed by Paley and Austin, is in sandstone with a slate roof. It has an L-shaped plan, with a gabled cross-wing, and is in one storey with an attic. The cross-wing contains a bow window, the main range has a mullioned window, and the porch is in the angle. | II |
| Royal Lancaster Infirmary; 54.04424°N 2.79932°W | | 1893–96 | The hospital by Paley, Austin and Paley is in free Renaissance style, and built in sandstone with slate roofs. It has an octagonal entrance tower that is flanked by wings. The tower has four stages, and above the entrance is a niche containing a Coade stone statue of the Good Samaritan. In the upper parts are a balustrade, bullseye windows, the Royal coat of arms, and a dome. The windows are sashes with architraves and a keystones. | II |
| Storey Home; 54.03348°N 2.80374°W | — | 1896–98 | A home for disadvantaged girls, later converted into flats, it is in sandstone with hipped Westmorland slate roofs. The east front has seven bays, the middle three with three storeys, and the outer bys forming slightly projecting two-bay wings. On the front is a canted porch, above which is a gablet with a coat of arms, and over this is an inscribed plaque. Also on the front are a canted bay window, a gabled dormer, and mullioned and transomed windows. | II |
| Cathedral School; 54.04671°N 2.79290°W | — | 1897 | A Roman Catholic school by Paley and Austin in Gothic Revival style. It is in sandstone with slate roofs, on a sloping site, in two storeys, with four gables facing the road. In front of the school is a low wall with piers and railings, containing a doorway with a pointed head, above which is a carved shield with a crown and a monogram. | II |
| Cross, Roman Catholic Cemetery; 54.04685°N 2.79202°W | — | 1899 | The cross replaced one of 1851 by E. G. Paley that was blown down in a gale. It is in sandstone and stands on two octagonal steps. It consists of an octagonal shaft on an octagonal base carved with a blind arcade and inscription. The shaft has a cap carved with a lamb and an eagle, and it carries a cross with Christ on one side and Mary on the other. | II |
| Bailrigg House; 54.01490°N 2.78754°W | — | 1899–1902 | A country house by Woolfall and Eccles in Vernacular Revival style with Arts and Crafts features. It is built mainly in brick with some sandstone dressings and applied timber-framing. Its features include multiple roofs, Tudor-style chimneys, gables, dormers, windows of varying types, gargoyles, and finials. | II |
| St Joseph's Church; 54.06049°N 2.80059°W | | 1900 | A Roman Catholic church by Pugin and Pugin in Perpendicular style. It is in sandstone with slate roofs, and consists of a nave with a clerestory, aisles, a chancel, north and south chapels, a south vestry, a southwest octagonal baptistry, and a southwest tower. The tower has a parapet with traceried openings and gargoyles, and there is a large west window. | II |
| Ashton Memorial; 54.04536°N 2.78196°W | | 1905–09 | Built as a memorial for the family of Lord Ashton, and designed by John Belcher in Edwardian Baroque style. It is in Portland stone over brick, and has steel joists and concrete infill. There are balustrades of Cornish granite and steps of Hopton Wood Stone. It has a square plan, is 150 feet (46 m) tall, and has a copper-clad dome. Other features include a flight of steps, dividing to enclose a fountain, porticos with Tuscan columns, and subsidiary domes, On the top is a drum with Corinthian columns, carved shields, structures of allegorical figures, and a lantern with a balustrade. | I |
| Bridge over lake 54.04361°N 2.78334°W | | 1909 | The bridge crosses the ornamental lake in Williamson Park. It was designed by Belcher and Joass, and is in rusticated sandstone, consisting of a single semi-elliptical arch with scrolled keystones. The parapets have moulded copings and three balustraded openings. | II |
| Palm House; 54.04546°N 2.78118°W | | c. 1909 | The palm house in Williamson Park is in brick on a sandstone plinth. It has glazing bars in timber and metal, and columns and a Doric entablature in timber and painted render. The building has a rectangular plan and a convex hipped glass roof. The west front is symmetrical and contains a central semicircular porch with six Tuscan columns, flanked on each side by three bays. | II |
| Tower, Williamson Park; 54.04434°N 2.78177°W | — | c. 1909 | The tower stands to the south of the Ashton Memorial, it is the remains of a garden pavilion, in limestone, and in Baroque style. The tower stands on a hexagonal stepped platform, it has a hexagonal plan, is about 10 metres (33 ft) high, and is in three unequal stages. In the top stage are small Ionic columns, a prominent cornice and a domed cap. | II |
| War Memorial, Christ Church; 54.04605°N 2.78851°W | | c. 1920 | The war memorial is in the churchyard, it is in sandstone, and consists of an octagonal plinth with two octagonal steps carrying a square base. The base has crocketed buttresses, and carvings on the sides. On the base stands a tapering octagonal shaft surmounted by a foliated capital and a cross. | II |
| War memorial, Storey Avenue; 54.04844°N 2.81238°W | | 1925 | The war memorial consists of a bronze statue on a sandstone base. There is a rectangular plinth on two steps, and the statue depicts a soldier supporting a wounded comrade and giving him a drink. On the base is an inscribed plaque. | II* |
| The Ruskin. Lancaster University; 54.01003°N 2.78797°W | | 1995–97 | The building houses The Ruskin Whitehouse Collection of works by John Ruskin. It is built in white concrete blocks with a sparkly marble aggregate and thin bands of green polished concrete, and the roof is of stainless-steel. Its plan is in the form of an ellipse. At the west end are doors in bronze, at the east end are loading doors in black aluminium, and above each is a large window. On the sides are smaller windows. | II |

== Notes and references ==
Notes

Citations

Sources

- Hartwell, Clare; Pevsner, Nikolaus (2009) [1969], Lancashire: North, The Buildings of England, New Haven and London: Yale University Press, ISBN 978-0-300-12667-9
- Historic England, "Three columns adjoining the southern corner of No.14 (Nantyr), Lancaster (1298330)", National Heritage List for England
- Historic England, "Golgotha, 1 Wyresdale Road, with attached garden walls, Lancaster (1215003)", National Heritage List for England
- Historic England, "No 20 Hala Road, Lancaster (1210762)", National Heritage List for England
- Historic England, "Scale Hall, Lancaster (1298365)", National Heritage List for England
- Historic England, "Golgotha, 2 Wyresdale Road, with attached garden walls, Lancaster (1215039)", National Heritage List for England
- Historic England, "Gate piers approximately 15 metres east of Scale Hall, Lancaster (1211774)", National Heritage List for England
- Historic England, "Gate piers approximately 5 metres south-west of Scale Hall, Lancaster (1194976)", National Heritage List for England
- Historic England, "No 10 Greaves Drive, Lancaster (1290354)", National Heritage List for England
- Historic England, "Brunton's Warehouse (south-eastern part only), Lancaster (1213894)", National Heritage List for England
- Historic England, "Laburnum Cottage and attached store to right, Lancaster (1298378)", National Heritage List for England
- Historic England, "Peel House, Lancaster (1298306)", National Heritage List for England
- Historic England, "Tonnage Warehouse, Lancaster (1195081)", National Heritage List for England
- Historic England, "Warehouse on corner of Duke Street, Lancaster (1288769)", National Heritage List for England
- Historic England, "Warehouse Number 3, Lancaster (1289129)", National Heritage List for England
- Historic England, "Quay Wall, Lancaster (1119687)", National Heritage List for England
- Historic England, "No 25 St George's Quay, Lancaster (1195082)", National Heritage List for England
- Historic England, "Warehouse on corner of Elm Street, Lancaster (1195045)", National Heritage List for England
- Historic England, "Maritime Museum, Lancaster (1289088)", National Heritage List for England
- Historic England, "Nos 1–5 Aldcliffe Village, Lancaster (1298377)", National Heritage List for England
- Historic England, "No 23 St George's Quay, Lancaster (1298307)", National Heritage List for England
- Historic England, "Nos 29–33 St George's Quay, Lancaster (1213806)", National Heritage List for England
- Historic England, "No 35 St George's Quay, Lancaster (1288858)", National Heritage List for England
- Historic England, "Nos 36–37 St George's Quay, Lancaster (1195084)", National Heritage List for England
- Historic England, "George and Dragon Public House, Lancaster (1289071)", National Heritage List for England
- Historic England, "Lunecliffe Hall, Lancaster (1194962)", National Heritage List for England
- Historic England, "Three warehouses, now part of No.26, Maritime Museum, Lancaster (1195083)", National Heritage List for England
- Historic England, "Victoria Corn Mill, Lancaster (1298309)", National Heritage List for England
- Historic England, "Wagon and Horses Public House, Lancaster (1289023)", National Heritage List for England
- Historic England, "Nos 38–42 Parliament Street, Lancaster (1194984)", National Heritage List for England
- Historic England, "Skerton Bridge, Lancaster (1212253)", National Heritage List for England
- Historic England, "Skerton Bridge, Lancaster (1005109)", National Heritage List for England
- Historic England, "Haverbreaks Bridge (No.95), Lancaster (1290286)", National Heritage List for England
- Historic England, "Basin Bridge (No.98), Lancaster (1194963)", National Heritage List for England
- Historic England, "Dolphinlee Bridge (No.105), Lancaster (1194907)", National Heritage List for England
- Historic England, "Halton Road Bridge (No.108), Lancaster (1194993)", National Heritage List for England
- Historic England, "Beaumont Hall Bridge (No.109), Lancaster (1194992)", National Heritage List for England
- Historic England, "Hammerton Hall Bridge (No.111), Lancaster (1298373)", National Heritage List for England
- Historic England, "Newton Beck Culvert, Lancaster (1194908)", National Heritage List for England
- Historic England, "Golgotha, 3–5 Wyresdale Road, with attached garden walls, Lancaster (1195063)", National Heritage List for England
- Historic England, "Golgotha, 7–10 Wyresdale Road, Lancaster (1298336)", National Heritage List for England
- Historic England, "Nos 21 and 22 St George's Quay, Lancaster (1213377)", National Heritage List for England
- Historic England, "No 34 St George's Quay, Lancaster (1298308)", National Heritage List for England
- Historic England, "Golgotha, 6 Wyresdale Road, with attached garden walls, Lancaster (1288284)", National Heritage List for England
- Historic England, "Old Blacksmith's Shop, approximately 30 metres east of Basin Bridge, Lancaster (1194964)", National Heritage List for England
- Historic England, "Row of outhouses approximately 3 metres to rear of Nos.3-10 Golgotha, Lancaster (1288289)", National Heritage List for England
- Historic England, "Bath House, Lancaster (1219976)", National Heritage List for England
- Historic England, "Moor Hospital, Blocks 40, 41, 42, 44 and 46, Lancaster (1289436)", National Heritage List for England
- Historic England, "Bowerham House, Lancaster (1288525)", National Heritage List for England
- Historic England, "Dacrelands, Lancaster (1194926)", National Heritage List for England
- Historic England, "Skerton Liberal Club, Lancaster (1290141)", National Heritage List for England
- Historic England, "East Lodge to former Aldcliffe Hall, Lancaster (1194966)", National Heritage List for England
- Historic England, "Old Boathouse on east side of Canal, approximately 100 metres west of Basin Bridge, Lancaster (1194965)", National Heritage List for England
- Historic England, "Church of St Luke, Lancaster (1195002)", National Heritage List for England
- Historic England, "Ryelands House, Lancaster (1212160)", National Heritage List for England
- Historic England, "Ryelands Lodge, Lancaster (1194983)", National Heritage List for England
- Historic England, "Nurses' Home, Lancaster (1194927)", National Heritage List for England
- Historic England, "Greaves Park, Lancaster (1194933)", National Heritage List for England
- Historic England, "Railway Station Buildings, Lancaster (1195054)", National Heritage List for England
- Historic England, "Perimeter walls and gateway of Roman Catholic Cemetery, Lancaster (1194924)", National Heritage List for England
- Historic England, "Royal Grammar School (Old School), Lancaster (1194925)", National Heritage List for England
- Historic England, "The Barracks, White Cross, Lancaster (1298329)", National Heritage List for England
- Historic England, "Eastern mortuary chapel at Lancaster Cemetery (1195078)", National Heritage List for England
- Historic England, "Northern mortuary chapel at Lancaster Cemetery (1212689)", National Heritage List for England
- Historic England, "Western mortuary chapel at Lancaster Cemetery (1298305)", National Heritage List for England
- Historic England, "Lancaster Cemetery Lodge (1212683)", National Heritage List for England
- Historic England, "Christ Church, Lancaster (1214919)", National Heritage List for England
- Historic England, "Cathedral Church of St Peter, Lancaster (1214397)", National Heritage List for England
- Historic England, "Cathedral House, Lancaster (1195053)", National Heritage List for England
- Historic England, "Crimea Monument in Lancaster Cemetery (1298304)", National Heritage List for England
- Historic England, "Entrance gateway at Ripley St Thomas School, Lancaster (1298379)", National Heritage List for England
- Historic England, "No 32 Parliament Street, Lancaster (1212179)", National Heritage List for England
- Historic England, "Waggon Works (front range and office), Lancaster (1298408)", National Heritage List for England
- Historic England, "Church of St Michael, Moor Hospital, Lancaster (1289454)", National Heritage List for England
- Historic England, "Royal Albert Hospital (original part only), Lancaster (1194930)", National Heritage List for England
- Historic England, "Christ Church Primary School, Lancaster (1391004)", National Heritage List for England
- Historic England, "Lodge to Royal Albert Hospital, Lancaster (1219861)", National Heritage List for England
- Historic England, "Church of St Paul, Lancaster (1288582)", National Heritage List for England
- Historic England, "Laurel Bank, Lancaster (1298333)", National Heritage List for England
- Historic England, "Main building at Royal Albert Farm, Royal Albert Hospital, Lancaster (1219846)", National Heritage List for England
- Historic England, "Barn at Royal Albert Farm, Royal Albert Hospital, Lancaster (1194931)", National Heritage List for England
- Historic England, "Western range of buildings at Royal Albert Farm, Royal Albert Hospital, Lancaster (1219893)", National Heritage List for England
- Historic England, "Water closet cubicle immediately north of apse of Church of St Michael, Moor Hospital, Lancaster (1289423)", National Heritage List for England
- Historic England, "Water closet cubicle immediately south of west porch of Church of St Michael, Moor Hospital, Lancaster (1195077)", National Heritage List for England
- Historic England, "The Knoll, Lancaster (1214751)", National Heritage List for England
- Historic England, "Gate piers, gates and walls to Williamson Park, Quernmore Road, Lancaster (1213076)", National Heritage List for England
- Historic England, "Gate piers, gates and walls to Williamson Park, Wyresdale Road, Lancaster (1214963)", National Heritage List for England
- Historic England, "Lodge to Williamson Park, Quernmore Road, Lancaster (1195080)", National Heritage List for England
- Historic England, "Lodge to Williamson Park, Wyresdale Road, Lancaster (1195062)", National Heritage List for England
- Historic England, "Moor Hospital, New Block, Lancaster (1195079)", National Heritage List for England
- Historic England, "Westbourne House, Lancaster (1195060)", National Heritage List for England
- Historic England, "Boundary walls, railings, gates and gate piers at Lancaster Moor Hospital (1391761)", National Heritage List for England
- Historic England, "Chapel of Ripley St Thomas School, Lancaster (1194928)", National Heritage List for England
- Historic England, "Entrance lodge at Ripley St Thomas School, Lancaster (1194929)", National Heritage List for England
- Historic England, "Royal Lancaster Infirmary (original building) (1194932)", National Heritage List for England
- Historic England, "Storey Home, Lancaster (1119699)", National Heritage List for England
- Historic England, "Cathedral School, including attached wall, railings and doorway, Lancaster (1219944)", National Heritage List for England
- Historic England, "Cross in Roman Catholic Cemetery, Lancaster (1210571)", National Heritage List for England
- Historic England, "Bailrigg House, Lancaster (1391378)", National Heritage List for England
- Historic England, "Church of St Joseph, Lancaster (1298370)", National Heritage List for England
- Historic England, "Ashton Memorial, Lancaster (1288429)", National Heritage List for England
- Historic England, "Bridge over the lake, Lancaster (1288372)", National Heritage List for England
- Historic England, "The Palm House, Lancaster (1195061)", National Heritage List for England
- Historic England, "Tower approximately 100 metres south of the Ashton Memorial, Lancaster (1298334)", National Heritage List for England
- Historic England, "War Memorial approximately 5 metres north of Christ Church, Lancaster (1298335)", National Heritage List for England
- Historic England, "War Memorial, Lancaster (1195055)", National Heritage List for England
- Historic England, "Municipal Baths and Transport Depot with low retaining walls to sides, Lancaster (1119714)", National Heritage List for England
- Historic England, "The Ruskin - Museum and Research Institute, Lancaster University, Lancaster (1497057)", National Heritage List for England
- Historic England, Listed Buildings
