= Chris Orr (artist) =

English artist & printmaker (born 1943)

Christopher Orr MBE RA (born 8 April 1943) is an English artist and printmaker who has exhibited worldwide and published over 400 limited edition prints in lithography, etching and silkscreen.

Orr was born in Islington, London. After studying at Ravensbourne and Hornsey Schools of Art, he graduated from the Royal College of Art in 1967 with an MA in printmaking. He was made a fellow of the Royal College of Art in 1985, a fellow of the Royal Society of Painter Printmakers in 1988, elected Royal Academician in 1995 and appointed professor of printmaking at The Royal College of Art 1998. Combining his work as a full-time artist with teaching, he has also taught at Cardiff College of Art, Central St Martins, London, and at the Royal College of Art, London.

He has described his own work as follows: "During my thirty nine years as an artist I have been put in various pigeon-holes, such as 'quintessential English' or a 'latter-day Hogarth'. But are these epithets reasonable? My pictures are composed of well-mixed metaphors, references, allusions jokes and descriptions. Does 'Chris Orr-like' refer to a typically English muddle? The tradition of graphic eccentricity (Heath Robinson, Donald McGill, Steve Bell et al.) is fair enough, I am happy to acknowledge many influences in this area."

Orr has had many one-man shows internationally, including Britain, France, America, Australia, Japan and China. He is represented by the Jill George Gallery, where he has been regularly exhibited since 1978.

He was appointed Member of the Order of the British Empire (MBE) in the 2008 Birthday Honours.

== Selected exhibitions ==
- 1971 Serpentine Gallery, London
- 1976 Whitechapel Gallery and Museum of Modern Art Oxford
- 1980 Galleria Grafica, Tokyo, Japan
- 1983 Jay Street Gallery, New York, US
- 1987 Print Guild, Melbourne, Australia
- 1990 Royal Festival Hall London
- 1994 Jill George Gallery
- 1996 Jill George Gallery
- 1998 Royal College of Art
- 1999 Royal Academy of Arts (Friends Room)
- 2001 Lewis Elton Gallery, University of Surrey, Guildford
- 2003 Jill George Gallery
- 2004 Ruskin Library, Lancaster
- 2005 Six Royal Academicians, Beijing and Shanghai
- 2012 LithORRgraphy: Chris Orr and the Art of Chemical Printing, at Royal Academy of Arts

== Public collections ==
- Arts Council of Great Britain
- Arts Council of Wales
- British Council
- Royal Academy of Arts
- Museum of London
- Victoria & Albert Museum
- Science Museum (London)
- The British Museum
- Ulster Folk and Transport Museum
- National Railway Museum, York
- Government Art Collection
- Tate Gallery
- The Ruskin Library Lancaster University

== Publications ==
- Many Mansions, Chris Orr and Michael Palin, 1990
- The Small Titanic, Chris Orr and Kevin Whately,1994. London: Pinko Productions ISBN 0951661612
- Happy Days, Chris Orr, 1999
- Semi-Antics, Chris Orr and Jill George, 2001
- The Multitude Diaries, Chris Orr, 2008. London: Royal Academy of Arts. ISBN 9781905711352
- The Making of Things, Chris Orr and Robert Hewison. Foreword by Michael Palin. London: Royal Academy of Arts (2013). ISBN 9781907533372
