= Climate of Nottingham =

Nottingham, United Kingdom

Climate chart (precipitation, max. and min. temperature)
J	F	M	A	M	J	J	A	S	O	N	D
59 7 2	50 8 2	46 10 3	48 13 5	50 16 7	67 19 10	65 21 12	64 21 12	57 18 10	72 14 7	69 10 4	70 7 2
- █ Average max. and min. temperatures in °C
- █ Precipitation totals in mm
- Source: Met Office
Imperial conversion
J	F	M	A	M	J	J	A	S	O	N	D
2.3 44 35	2 46 35	1.8 50 37	1.9 56 41	2 61 45	2.6 67 51	2.6 71 54	2.5 70 54	2.3 65 50	2.8 57 45	2.7 50 40	2.7 45 36
- █ Average max. and min. temperatures in °F
- █ Precipitation totals in inches

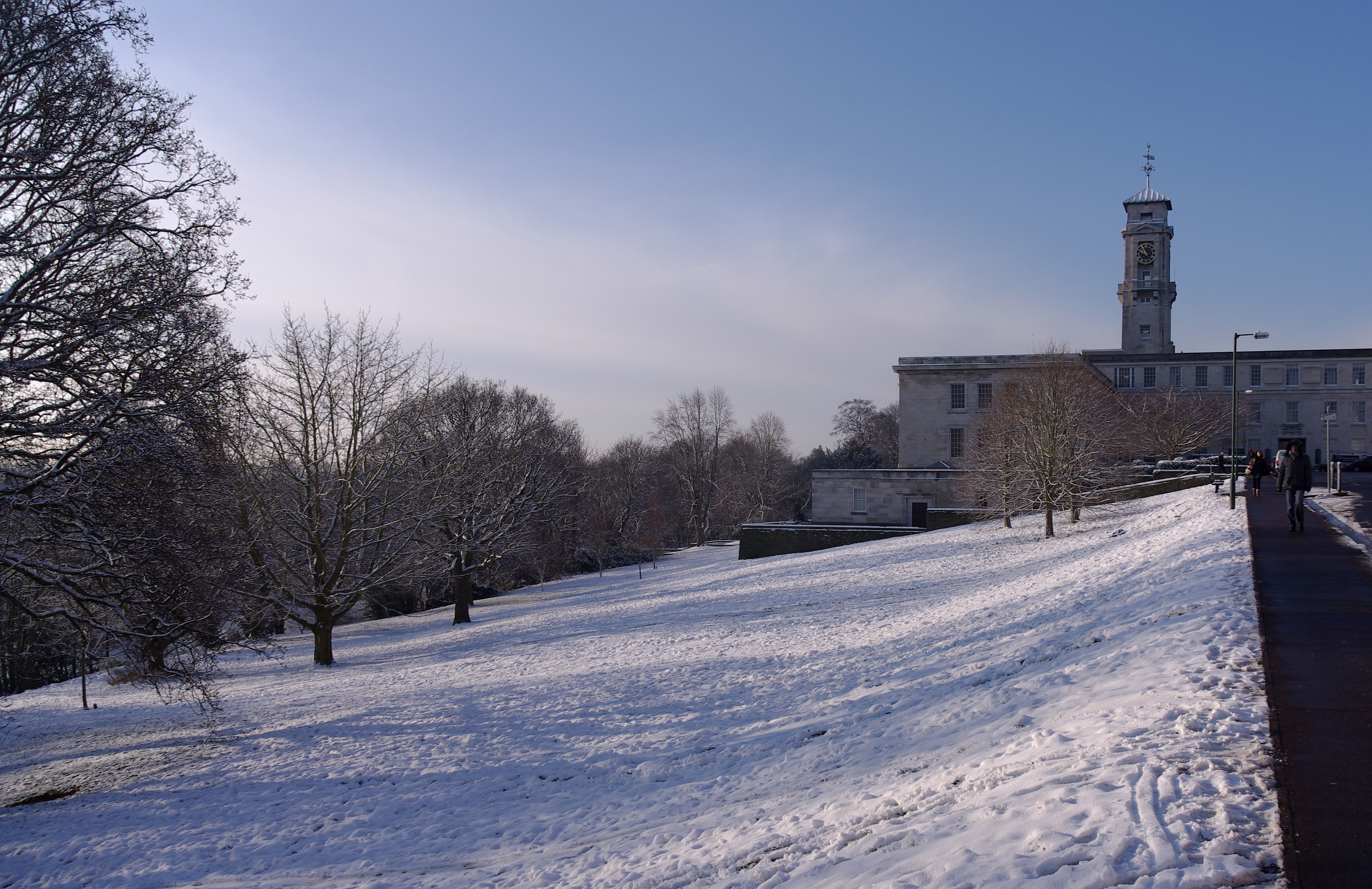
University Park Campus after snowfall in January 2013.

The climate of Nottingham features a temperate maritime climate (Köppen: Cfb) with relatively mild summers, cool winters and abundant rainfall throughout the year. Since 1960, rainfall and temperature records for the city have been kept at the Nottingham Weather Centre in Watnall. There is also another weather station operating at the University of Nottingham's agricultural campus in Sutton Bonington.

Since records began, the highest temperature recorded in Nottingham is 39.8 °C (103.6 °F) on 19 July 2022, and the lowest temperature recorded is −13.3 °C (8.1 °F) on 13 January 1987 and 23 January 1963. Although during the winter of 1947, a temperature of −17.8 °C (0.0 °F) was recorded at Sutton Bonington on 24 February 1947.

== Classifications ==
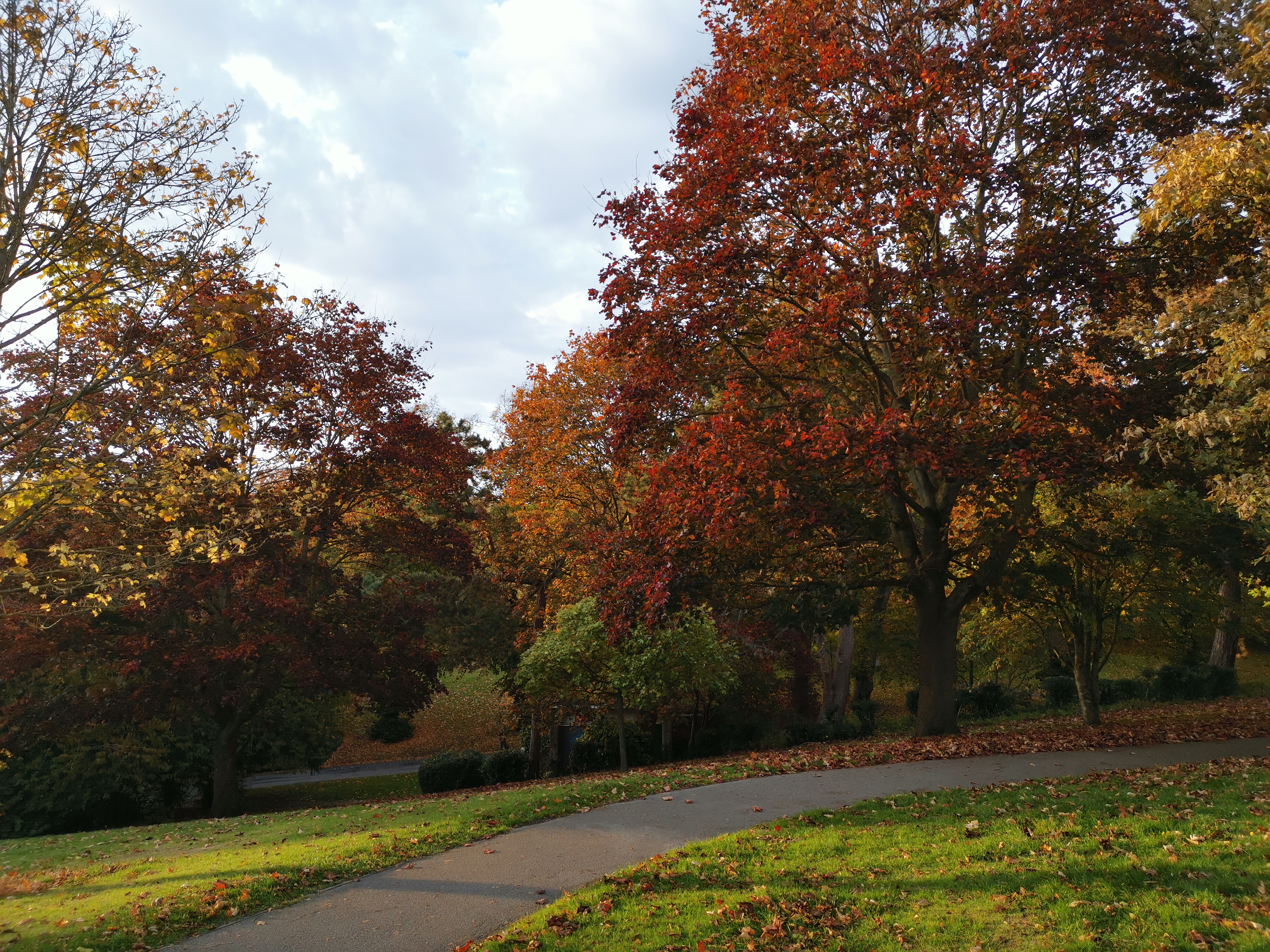
The Arboretum, Nottingham in Autumn.

Nottingham Climate according to major climate systems
Climatic scheme	Initials	Description
Köppen system	Cfb	Oceanic climate (Note: Also called marine west coast.)
Trewartha system	Do	Temperate oceanic climate
Alisov system	—N/a	Temperate climate (Note: Mid-latitude temperate maritime climate)
Strahler system	—N/a	Marine west-coast
Thornthwaite system	C2 B'1	Moist subhumid
Neef system	—N/a	West side/maritime climate

== Temperature ==
The average annual high temperature in Nottingham is 13.8 °C (56.8 °F) and the average annual low is 6.5 °C (43.7 °F). The average daily mean is 10.1 °C (50.2 °F). All averages and extremes are recorded at the Nottingham Weather Centre in Watnall.

=== Averages ===
Climate data for Nottingham Watnall, (Note: Weather station is located 5.6 miles (9.0 km) from the Nottingham city centre.) elevation: 117 m (384 ft), 1991–2020 normals
Month	Jan	Feb	Mar	Apr	May	Jun	Jul	Aug	Sep	Oct	Nov	Dec	Year
Mean daily maximum °C (°F)	6.9 (44.4)	7.7 (45.9)	10.1 (50.2)	13.2 (55.8)	16.4 (61.5)	19.2 (66.6)	21.5 (70.7)	21.1 (70.0)	18.1 (64.6)	13.9 (57.0)	9.8 (49.6)	7.2 (45.0)	13.8 (56.8)
Daily mean °C (°F)	4.3 (39.7)	4.7 (40.5)	6.5 (43.7)	9.0 (48.2)	11.9 (53.4)	14.8 (58.6)	16.9 (62.4)	16.7 (62.1)	14.2 (57.6)	10.7 (51.3)	7.0 (44.6)	4.6 (40.3)	10.1 (50.2)
Mean daily minimum °C (°F)	1.7 (35.1)	1.7 (35.1)	3.0 (37.4)	4.8 (40.6)	7.5 (45.5)	10.4 (50.7)	12.4 (54.3)	12.3 (54.1)	10.2 (50.4)	7.4 (45.3)	4.2 (39.6)	2.0 (35.6)	6.5 (43.7)
Source: Met Office

Climate data for Nottingham Watnall, (Note: Weather station is located 5.6 miles (9.0 km) from the Nottingham city centre.) elevation: 117 m (384 ft), 1961–1990 normals
Month	Jan	Feb	Mar	Apr	May	Jun	Jul	Aug	Sep	Oct	Nov	Dec	Year
Mean daily maximum °C (°F)	5.9 (42.6)	6.1 (43.0)	8.8 (47.8)	11.6 (52.9)	15.6 (60.1)	18.7 (65.7)	20.4 (68.7)	20.2 (68.4)	17.5 (63.5)	13.7 (56.7)	8.9 (48.0)	6.7 (44.1)	12.9 (55.2)
Daily mean °C (°F)	3.2 (37.8)	3.2 (37.8)	5.3 (41.5)	7.6 (45.7)	11.0 (51.8)	14.1 (57.4)	15.9 (60.6)	15.7 (60.3)	13.4 (56.1)	10.2 (50.4)	6.0 (42.8)	4.1 (39.4)	9.2 (48.6)
Mean daily minimum °C (°F)	0.6 (33.1)	0.4 (32.7)	1.8 (35.2)	3.6 (38.5)	6.4 (43.5)	9.4 (48.9)	11.3 (52.3)	11.2 (52.2)	9.3 (48.7)	6.8 (44.2)	3.1 (37.6)	1.5 (34.7)	5.5 (41.9)
Source: Met Office

=== Highest daily temperatures ===
Period	Record temperature	Date
January	14.5 °C (58.1 °F)	9 Jan 2015
February	18.6 °C (65.5 °F)	26 Feb 2019
March	22.8 °C (73.0 °F)	29 Mar 1965
April	25.9 °C (78.6 °F)	19 Apr 2018
May	32.4 °C (90.3 °F)	26 May 2026
June	34.8 °C (94.6 °F)	26 Jun 2026
July	39.8 °C (103.6 °F)	19 Jul 2022
August	36.9 °C (98.4 °F)	13 Aug 2026
September	30.8 °C (87.4 °F)	9 Sep 2023
October	28.4 °C (83.1 °F)	1 Oct 2011
November	17.9 °C (64.2 °F)	2 Nov 2005
December	15.0 °C (59.0 °F)	19 Dec 2015; 7 Dec 2015

=== Lowest daily temperatures ===
Period	Record temperature	Date
January	−13.3 °C (8.1 °F)	13 Jan 1987; 23 Jan 1963
February	−11.1 °C (12.0 °F)	10 Feb 1986
March	−10.6 °C (12.9 °F)	3 Mar 1965
April	−4.6 °C (23.7 °F)	9 Apr 1973
May	−2.1 °C (28.2 °F)	3 May 1967
June	1.0 °C (33.8 °F)	1 Jun 1962
July	4.4 °C (39.9 °F)	12 Jul 1972; 17 Jul 1965; 4 Jul 1965
August	4.5 °C (40.1 °F)	20 Aug 1964
September	0.9 °C (33.6 °F)	16 Sep 1975
October	−3.1 °C (26.4 °F)	29 Oct 1997
November	−9.2 °C (15.4 °F)	28 Nov 2010
December	−12.0 °C (10.4 °F)	7 Dec 2010

=== Daily record warm minima ===
Period	Record temperature	Date
January	11.6 °C (52.9 °F)	1 Jan 2022
February	11.6 °C (52.9 °F)	4 Feb 2004
March	11.9 °C (53.4 °F)	31 Mar 2017
April	13.2 °C (55.8 °F)	24 Apr 2007
May	17.0 °C (62.6 °F)	26 May 2026
June	21.3 °C (70.3 °F)	24 Jun 2026
July	20.3 °C (68.5 °F)	20 Jul 2022
August	19.9 °C (67.8 °F)	9 Aug 2004
September	18.1 °C (64.6 °F)	7 Sep 2016
October	16.0 °C (60.8 °F)	3 Oct 2011
November	13.6 °C (56.5 °F)	3 Nov 1969
December	12.5 °C (54.5 °F)	11 Dec 1994

=== Daily record cold maxima ===
Period	Record temperature	Date
January	−6.3 °C (20.7 °F)	13 Jan 1963
February	−2.5 °C (27.5 °F)	15 Feb 1979
March	−0.5 °C (31.1 °F)	2 Mar 2018
April	1.6 °C (34.9 °F)	25 Apr 1981; 13 Apr 1978
May	6.4 °C (43.5 °F)	1 May 1978
June	9.2 °C (48.6 °F)	6 Jun 1985
July	11.7 °C (53.1 °F)	8 Jul 2004
August	12.4 °C (54.3 °F)	18 Aug 1964
September	7.5 °C (45.5 °F)	27 Sep 1974
October	5.3 °C (41.5 °F)	28 Oct 2008
November	−0.7 °C (30.7 °F)	27 Nov 1969
December	−4.6 °C (23.7 °F)	27 Dec 1961

=== Highest averages ===
Period	Record mean	Year
Year	10.8 °C (51.4 °F)	2006
Spring (March–May)	10.5 °C (50.9 °F)	2011
Summer (June–August)	17.5 °C (63.5 °F)	1976
Autumn (September–November)	12.4 °C (54.3 °F)	2006
Winter (December–February)	6.5 °C (43.7 °F)	2006–2007
January	6.5 °C (43.7 °F)	2007
February	7.5 °C (45.5 °F)	1998
March	8.5 °C (47.3 °F)	2012
April	11.9 °C (53.4 °F)	2011
May	13.6 °C (56.5 °F)	2018
June	17.1 °C (62.8 °F)	1976
July	20.2 °C (68.4 °F)	2006
August	19.3 °C (66.7 °F)	1975
September	16.7 °C (62.1 °F)	2006
October	13.1 °C (55.6 °F)	2001
November	8.9 °C (48.0 °F)	1994
December	9.0 °C (48.2 °F)	2015

=== Lowest averages ===
Period	Record mean	Year
Year	8.0 °C (46.4 °F)	1963
Spring (March–May)	6.4 °C (43.5 °F)	1962
Summer (June–August)	14.0 °C (57.2 °F)	1972
Autumn (September–November)	8.1 °C (46.6 °F)	1993
Winter (December–February)	−0.7 °C (30.7 °F)	1962–1963
January	−2.2 °C (28.0 °F)	1963
February	−1.8 °C (28.8 °F)	1986
March	2.3 °C (36.1 °F)	1962
April	5.7 °C (42.3 °F)	1986
May	8.9 °C (48.0 °F)	1996
June	11.8 °C (53.2 °F)	1972
July	13.5 °C (56.3 °F)	1965
August	13.4 °C (56.1 °F)	1986
September	11.3 °C (52.3 °F)	1986
October	7.3 °C (45.1 °F)	1992
November	3.5 °C (38.3 °F)	1985
December	−0.7 °C (30.7 °F)	2010

== Precipitation ==
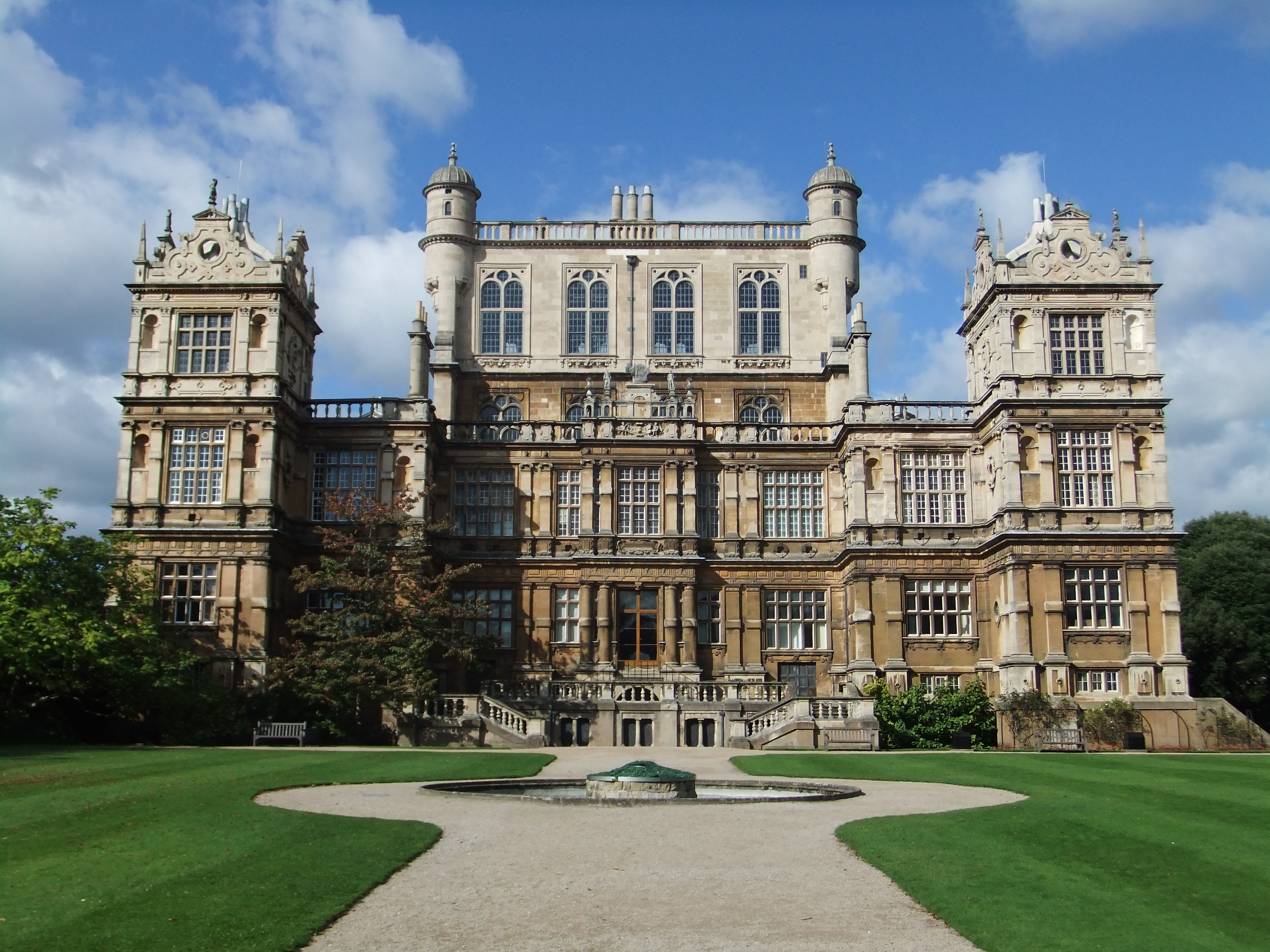
Autumn at Wollaton Hall, October 2012.

With its oceanic climate, Nottingham sees frequent precipitation all year round, with no wet or dry season. This is mainly in the form of rain with an average of 709.4 millimetres (27.93 in) annually. By average volume, October is the wettest month, whilst February is the driest. Nottingham also sees snow, primarily during the winter, however heavy snow is rare.

=== Averages ===
Climate data for Nottingham Watnall, (Note: Weather station is located 5.6 miles (9.0 km) from the Nottingham city centre.) elevation: 117 m (384 ft), 1991–2020 normals
Month	Jan	Feb	Mar	Apr	May	Jun	Jul	Aug	Sep	Oct	Nov	Dec	Year
Average precipitation mm (inches)	59.1 (2.33)	49.8 (1.96)	45.5 (1.79)	47.6 (1.87)	49.8 (1.96)	66.7 (2.63)	65.2 (2.57)	63.7 (2.51)	57.4 (2.26)	71.7 (2.82)	69.5 (2.74)	69.6 (2.74)	715.6 (28.17)
Average snowfall mm (inches)	10 (0.4)	19 (0.7)	5 (0.2)	1 (0.0)	0 (0)	0 (0)	0 (0)	0 (0)	0 (0)	0 (0)	2 (0.1)	5 (0.2)	42 (1.6)
Average precipitation days (≥ 1.0 mm)	11.6	10.9	10.1	9.4	9.0	9.8	9.4	9.5	9.8	11.2	12.7	12.3	125.9
Average snowy days	2.7	3.8	1.3	0.2	0.0	0.0	0.0	0.0	0.0	0.0	0.3	1.5	9.8
Source 1: Met Office
Source 2: WeatherAtlas

=== Extremes ===
==== Lowest ====
Period	Record rainfall	Year
Year	435.6 millimetres (17.15 in)	2011
Spring (March–May)	49.4 millimetres (1.94 in)	1990
Summer (June–August)	21.0 millimetres (0.83 in)	1995
Autumn (September–November)	88.0 millimetres (3.46 in)	1964
Winter (December–February)	59.6 millimetres (2.35 in)	1963–1964
January	11.0 millimetres (0.43 in)	1997
February	8.6 millimetres (0.34 in)	2023
March	5.8 millimetres (0.23 in)	1961
April	3.2 millimetres (0.13 in)	2011
May	3.6 millimetres (0.14 in)	2020
June	5.0 millimetres (0.20 in)	1995
July	0.6 millimetres (0.024 in)	2026
August	5.2 millimetres (0.20 in)	1995
September	8.7 millimetres (0.34 in)	1986
October	9.6 millimetres (0.38 in)	1978
November	17.6 millimetres (0.69 in)	2021
December	18.0 millimetres (0.71 in)	2016

==== Highest ====
Period	Record rainfall	Year
Year	1,036.8 millimetres (40.82 in)	2023
Spring (March–May)	285.5 millimetres (11.24 in)	1979
Summer (June–August)	341.6 millimetres (13.45 in)	2007
Autumn (September–November)	378.2 millimetres (14.89 in)	2019
Winter (December–February)	364.9 millimetres (14.37 in)	1965–1966
January	130.0 millimetres (5.12 in)	2021
February	198.4 millimetres (7.81 in)	1977
March	114.2 millimetres (4.50 in)	1964
April	139.4 millimetres (5.49 in)	2012
May	135.0 millimetres (5.31 in)	1969
June	168.2 millimetres (6.62 in)	2007
July	152.4 millimetres (6.00 in)	2002
August	163.8 millimetres (6.45 in)	2004
September	155.0 millimetres (6.10 in)	2024
October	155.4 millimetres (6.12 in)	2023
November	146.0 millimetres (5.75 in)	2019
December	179.6 millimetres (7.07 in)	1965

== Other phenomena ==
=== Sunshine, UV and daylight ===
Like most of the UK, Nottingham sees frequent overcast and cloudy skies due to the oceanic controlled climate and high latitude.

Climate data for Nottingham Watnall, (Note: Weather station is located 5.6 miles (9.0 km) from the Nottingham city centre.) elevation: 117 m (384 ft), 1991–2020 normals
Month	Jan	Feb	Mar	Apr	May	Jun	Jul	Aug	Sep	Oct	Nov	Dec	Year
Mean monthly sunshine hours	56.0	77.7	116.2	152.3	191.5	170.5	191.5	177.6	137.5	96.9	64.1	55.3	1,487
Mean daily daylight hours	8.2	9.9	11.9	14.0	15.9	16.8	16.3	14.7	12.7	10.6	8.7	7.7	12.3
Average ultraviolet index	2	2	3	3	4	4	4	4	4	3	2	2	3
Source 1: Met Office
Source 2: WeatherAtlas

=== Wind ===
The mean yearly wind speed at 10m in Nottingham is 8.1 mph (7.0 kn).

Period	Mean wind speed at 10m
Annual	9.2 mph (8.0 kn)
January	9.3 mph (8.1 kn)
February	9.1 mph (7.9 kn)
March	8.3 mph (7.2 kn)
April	7.9 mph (6.9 kn)
May	7.2 mph (6.3 kn)
June	6.9 mph (6.0 kn)
July	6.9 mph (6.0 kn)
August	6.9 mph (6.0 kn)
September	7.1 mph (6.2 kn)
October	7.9 mph (6.9 kn)
November	8.3 mph (7.2 kn)
December	8.6 mph (7.5 kn)

== Station Data ==
Climate data for Nottingham Watnall, (Note: Weather station is located 5.6 miles (9.0 km) from the Nottingham city centre.) 117 m (384 ft) amsl, 1991–2020 normals, extremes 1957–present
Month	Jan	Feb	Mar	Apr	May	Jun	Jul	Aug	Sep	Oct	Nov	Dec	Year
Record high °C (°F)	14.5 (58.1)	18.6 (65.5)	22.8 (73.0)	25.9 (78.6)	32.4 (90.3)	34.8 (94.6)	39.8 (103.6)	36.9 (98.4)	30.8 (87.4)	28.4 (83.1)	17.9 (64.2)	15.0 (59.0)	39.8 (103.6)
Mean daily maximum °C (°F)	6.9 (44.4)	7.7 (45.9)	10.1 (50.2)	13.2 (55.8)	16.4 (61.5)	19.2 (66.6)	21.5 (70.7)	21.1 (70.0)	18.1 (64.6)	13.9 (57.0)	9.8 (49.6)	7.2 (45.0)	13.8 (56.8)
Daily mean °C (°F)	4.3 (39.7)	4.7 (40.5)	6.5 (43.7)	9.0 (48.2)	11.9 (53.4)	14.8 (58.6)	16.9 (62.4)	16.7 (62.1)	14.2 (57.6)	10.7 (51.3)	7.0 (44.6)	4.6 (40.3)	10.1 (50.2)
Mean daily minimum °C (°F)	1.7 (35.1)	1.7 (35.1)	3.0 (37.4)	4.8 (40.6)	7.5 (45.5)	10.4 (50.7)	12.4 (54.3)	12.3 (54.1)	10.2 (50.4)	7.4 (45.3)	4.2 (39.6)	2.0 (35.6)	6.5 (43.7)
Record low °C (°F)	−13.3 (8.1)	−11.1 (12.0)	−10.6 (12.9)	−4.6 (23.7)	−2.1 (28.2)	1.0 (33.8)	4.4 (39.9)	4.5 (40.1)	0.9 (33.6)	−3.1 (26.4)	−9.2 (15.4)	−12.0 (10.4)	−13.3 (8.1)
Average precipitation mm (inches)	59.1 (2.33)	49.8 (1.96)	45.5 (1.79)	47.6 (1.87)	49.8 (1.96)	66.7 (2.63)	65.2 (2.57)	63.7 (2.51)	57.4 (2.26)	71.7 (2.82)	69.5 (2.74)	69.6 (2.74)	715.6 (28.17)
Average snowfall mm (inches)	10 (0.4)	19 (0.7)	5 (0.2)	1 (0.0)	0 (0)	0 (0)	0 (0)	0 (0)	0 (0)	0 (0)	2 (0.1)	5 (0.2)	42 (1.6)
Average precipitation days (≥ 1.0 mm)	11.6	10.9	10.1	9.4	9.0	9.8	9.4	9.5	9.8	11.2	12.7	12.3	125.9
Average snowy days	2.7	3.8	1.3	0.2	0.0	0.0	0.0	0.0	0.0	0.0	0.3	1.5	9.8
Average relative humidity (%)	89	86	82	81	81	83	79	78	81	85	88	90	84
Mean monthly sunshine hours	56.0	77.7	116.2	152.3	191.5	170.5	191.5	177.6	137.5	96.9	64.1	55.3	1,487
Mean daily daylight hours	8.2	9.9	11.9	14.0	15.9	16.8	16.3	14.7	12.7	10.6	8.7	7.7	12.3
Average ultraviolet index	2	2	3	3	4	4	4	4	4	3	2	2	3
Source 1: Met Office ECA&D
Source 2: CEDA Archive WeatherAtlas

Climate data for Sutton Bonington (Note: Weather station is located 9.0 miles (14.5 km) from the Nottingham city centre, and 11.1 miles (17.9 km) from the Derby city centre.), 48 m (157 ft) amsl; 1991–2020 normals, extremes 1924–present
Month	Jan	Feb	Mar	Apr	May	Jun	Jul	Aug	Sep	Oct	Nov	Dec	Year
Record high °C (°F)	15.8 (60.4)	17.9 (64.2)	22.9 (73.2)	26.5 (79.7)	32.3 (90.1)	34.8 (94.6)	39.4 (102.9)	36.1 (97.0)	30.9 (87.6)	28.8 (83.8)	20.0 (68.0)	15.9 (60.6)	39.4 (102.9)
Mean daily maximum °C (°F)	7.5 (45.5)	8.1 (46.6)	10.5 (50.9)	13.6 (56.5)	16.7 (62.1)	19.6 (67.3)	22.0 (71.6)	21.8 (71.2)	18.7 (65.7)	14.5 (58.1)	10.4 (50.7)	7.8 (46.0)	14.3 (57.7)
Daily mean °C (°F)	4.7 (40.5)	5.0 (41.0)	6.8 (44.2)	9.1 (48.4)	11.9 (53.4)	14.9 (58.8)	17.1 (62.8)	17.0 (62.6)	14.4 (57.9)	11.0 (51.8)	7.4 (45.3)	4.9 (40.8)	10.3 (50.5)
Mean daily minimum °C (°F)	1.9 (35.4)	1.9 (35.4)	3.0 (37.4)	4.6 (40.3)	7.2 (45.0)	10.1 (50.2)	12.1 (53.8)	12.2 (54.0)	10.1 (50.2)	7.5 (45.5)	4.4 (39.9)	2.1 (35.8)	6.5 (43.7)
Record low °C (°F)	−16.7 (1.9)	−17.8 (0.0)	−13.3 (8.1)	−6.7 (19.9)	−4.4 (24.1)	−1.1 (30.0)	1.7 (35.1)	1.1 (34.0)	−1.8 (28.8)	−6.7 (19.9)	−9.9 (14.2)	−15.3 (4.5)	−17.8 (0.0)
Average precipitation mm (inches)	50.7 (2.00)	41.2 (1.62)	40.6 (1.60)	44.3 (1.74)	46.3 (1.82)	63.7 (2.51)	61.8 (2.43)	54.6 (2.15)	49.2 (1.94)	62.7 (2.47)	56.9 (2.24)	58.1 (2.29)	630.0 (24.80)
Average precipitation days (≥ 1.0 mm)	10.9	9.6	9.6	9.6	8.9	9.5	9.6	8.6	8.9	10.4	11.0	11.7	118.3
Mean monthly sunshine hours	51.6	76.1	115.6	152.0	182.9	161.8	190.1	175.6	136.7	100.8	61.5	47.7	1,452.4
Source 1: Met Office
Source 2: CEDA Archive Starlings Roost Weather
