= CEDA (disambiguation) =

CEDA is the Confederación Española de Derechas Autónomas, a 1930s Spanish political party.

CEDA may also refer to:

- Centre for Environmental Data Analysis, a British government organisation serving the environmental science community
- Committee for Economic Development of Australia, an Australian economic think-tank
- Computer Entertainment Developers Association, a precursor to the International Game Developers Association
- Cross Examination Debate Association, an intercollegiate debate association founded in the United States
- IEEE Council on Electronic Design Automation, an organizational unit of the Institute of Electrical and Electronics Engineers
