= Jack Scott (meteorologist) =

English meteorologist (1923–2008)

- Born: John Scott; 9 November 1923; Ferryhill, England
- Died: 11 November 2008 (aged 85)
- Occupations: Meteorologist; Broadcaster
- Employer: Met Office
- Known for: Presenting weather forecasts on BBC Television and Thames News
- Spouse: Marrion (died 2000)
- Children: 2

John Scott (9 November 1923 – 11 November 2008) was an English television weatherman who appeared for the BBC, ITV and Channel 4 during a 20-year broadcasting career. He worked for the Met Office in 1941, working at Royal Air Force bases during the Second World War. Scott did aerological forecasting before successfully auditioning to appear on BBC Television, where he remained until 1983. Scott then worked at Thames Television on its evening Thames News bulletin from 1983 to 1988.

== Early life ==
Born on 9 November 1923, the son of a miner at the nearby Mainsforth Colliery, County Durham in East Howle, a Category D village outside of Ferryhill, he attended Spennymoor Grammar School in Spennymoor. He went to Nottingham Technical College (which eventually became Nottingham Trent University), leaving in 1941.

In 1941, upon leaving school at age 17, Scott decided not to work in the coal mines. He instead joined the Met Office at Gloucester after answering a newspaper advertisement for schoolboy weather forecasters. Scott spent 18 months at Thornaby-on-Tees, later joining the Royal Air Force and serving in Sullom Voe in the Shetlands, Malta and North Africa during and after World War II. During the 1950s and 1960s he worked in aerological forecasting. His workplaces were RAF Watnall Weather Centre (today the Nottingham Weather Centre) on the outskirts of Nottingham, and then in Nairobi, Kenya, and at RAF Uxbridge near London.

== Broadcasting career ==
In 1968, Scott was advised by his Met Office boss to apply for a job in television. He was successful, and made his television debut in May 1969 as the BBC's twentieth weather forecaster. Scott was mentored by the meteorologists Graham Parker and Bert Foord. As Scott was employed by the Civil Service rather than the BBC, when he left the BBC and the Met Office at the end of April 1983 aged 59, he was able to draw a Civil Service pension; Scott also worked as a higher scientific officer at the Ministry of Defence. He said money was not the factor in his leaving the Met Office.

Scott went on to work for the ITV London franchise Thames Television on its evening Thames News bulletin from May 1983 to June 1988, and was a presenter of Channel 4's magazine programme for the over 60s, Years Ahead, from 1988 to 1989. He also made regular appearances on the daytime programme Pebble Mill at One discussing weather-related topics, did the same on John Dunn's teatime show on BBC Radio 2 and presented the six-part BBC2 television series called Under the Weather in mid-1981. Scott was the author of the 1975 children's book about the weather Fun With Meteorology. He was a guest on Mike Neville's BBC1 series Mike on Friday in May 1980, and provided the weather forecast for the Wedding of Prince Charles and Lady Diana Spencer on 29 July 1981.

Described by the BBC as a "pioneer", Scott introduced the magnetic symbols to viewers as the replacement of static weather maps in 1975, which could sometimes slip or fall off onto the studio floor during broadcasts. He was also instrumental in laying the foundations of the computerised system of forecasting used today. Mark Byford, the BBC's Deputy Director-General, praised Scott's "wonderful gift of authority and knowledge matched by a warm and accessible style."

== Personal life ==
Scott was married to Marrion (who died in 2000) and had two sons, David (who survived him) and Jonathan, who died in a climbing accident in the Himalayas. He was a member of Burnham Beeches Golf Club in Buckinghamshire and became its captain. Scott lived in Iver Heath, in the former South Bucks district.

He died of cancer aged 85 on 11 November 2008.
