= Poppyhead =

Poppyhead may refer to:

- The fruit (seed pod) of a poppy; see Papaveraceae
- Poppyhead (carving), on the ends of church stalls and benches
