= Peter Willis (referee) =

English football referee (1937–2021)

- Born: 26 October 1937; Newfield, Bishop Auckland, County Durham, England
- Died: 20 July 2021 (aged 83); Durham, England
- Other occupation: Police officer

Domestic
Years	League	Role
1968–1972	Football League	Linesman
1972–1986	Football League	Referee

Peter N. Willis (26 October 1937 – 20 July 2021) was an English association football referee, who operated in the Football League. He also worked as a police officer.

== Early life ==
Willis originated from Newfield, near Bishop Auckland, County Durham. He went to Spennymoor Grammar School, and later played amateur football for Tow Law Town. He was signed by Newcastle United, but never played above reserve level for them, eventually giving up to join the police force. He served at Cassop and Quarrington Hill, also playing football for their local teams. Throughout his career, his wife Helen had been "hugely supportive".

== Career ==
Before one of those local matches in 1963, the appointed referee failed to turn up. Willis took charge of the game, and soon after formally trained as a referee.

He became a Football League linesman in 1968. He was promoted to the supplementary list of referees in 1971 and the full list in 1972.

He was appointed to the Football League Cup Final of 1982, when Liverpool defeated Tottenham 3–1, after extra time.

Willis refereed the 1985 FA Cup Final between Manchester United and Everton, which United won 1–0, courtesy of a Norman Whiteside goal during extra time. This appointment made him one of very few non-FIFA referees to control both major English Cup Finals. In the 78th minute of normal time he sent off Kevin Moran of Manchester United after a foul on Everton's Peter Reid 40 yards (37 m) away from goal. In a 2002 newspaper article, Willis commented: "Moran just kicked him. Peter Reid might well have gone higher up in the air than he needed to but I saw what happened and I had a decision to make. I either put the whistle on the ground and walked off, or applied the laws of the game and sent him off."

Moran put his side of it in a 2006 interview: "... I didn't think it was a foul; I had no intention of pulling Peter Reid down and felt I never touched him. I went into the tackle from the side and his momentum flicked him over, as if I'd clattered him. I couldn't believe it when I got a straight red."

Moran therefore became the first player ever to be dismissed from the field of play in an FA Cup Final. Willis said: "It's never caused me a problem. I've never felt guilty about it, because it was the right decision. I just wish it hadn't happened because I'd rather be remembered for other reasons." (The Red Card was not shown, because Red & Yellow Cards were not shown in English Football League matches between January 1981 and August 1987.)

Following this match he had one final season on the league list (1985–1986). His last match was at Goodison Park where Everton needed to beat Southampton to have any chance of retaining the league title. They did indeed win (6–1) but Liverpool won at Chelsea to claim the honour.

He is said to be one of only five freemasons to have been in charge of an FA Cup Final.

He was president of the Referees' Association from 1984 to 2002. He suffered a stroke in 2000, which was a factor in his deciding to stand down from the presidency.

At the annual dinner of the Durham County Referees' Society, held at Bishop Auckland Town Hall on 23 November 2002, Willis was honoured with a life membership of the Referees' Association.

== Personal life and death ==
Willis lived in Meadowfield.

He died on 20 July 2021, at the age of 83.

Preceded by John Hunting	FA Cup Final Referee; 1985	Succeeded by Alan Robinson
