= Lancaster Cemetery Chapels =

Chapels in Lancaster, England

Western Mortuary Chapel at Lancaster Cemetery
- Location within Lancaster

Religion
- Affiliation: Anglican

Location
- Location: Quernmore Road, Lancaster, Lancashire, England
- Coordinates: 54.0504°N 2.7769°W

Architecture
- Architect: E. G. Paley
- Type: Chapel
- Style: Gothic Revival
- Completed: 1855
- Materials: Coursed squared sandstone with ashlar dressings and slate roofs
- Listed Building – Grade II
- Designated: 13 March 1995
- Reference no.: 1298305

Eastern Mortuary Chapel at Lancaster Cemetery

Religion
- Affiliation: Nonconformist

Location
- Interactive map of Eastern Mortuary Chapel at Lancaster Cemetery

Architecture
- Listed Building – Grade II
- Designated: 13 March 1995
- Reference no.: 1195078

Northern Mortuary Chapel at Lancaster Cemetery

Religion
- Affiliation: Roman Catholic

Location
- Interactive map of Northern Mortuary Chapel at Lancaster Cemetery

Architecture
- Listed Building – Grade II
- Designated: 13 March 1995
- Reference no.: 1212689

The Lancaster Cemetery Chapels are the three chapels, each built to serve a different denomination, in the main cemetery of Lancaster, England. The chapels stand around a central point at the highest part of the cemetery. They were all built in 1854–55, and were designed by the local architect E. G. Paley. The chapel to the west of the central point served the Anglicans, that to the east the Non-conformists, and the chapel to the north was for Roman Catholics.

== Architecture ==
All the chapels are constructed in coursed squared sandstone with ashlar dressings. They have slate roofs, and are in Gothic Revival style. The western chapel has a cruciform plan, with the entrance porch facing east. It has angle buttresses and coped gables. A continuous string course runs round the chapel at the level of the window sills. The windows in the north and south walls are triple stepped lancets. In the west gable is a wheel window. The porch is long, with open arcades along the sides supported by polished granite shafts. In the gable of the porch is a poppyhead, and on its apex stands a cross finial. The eastern chapel is a mirror image of the western chapel. The northern chapel is simpler, having a rectangular plan, with a narrow projection to the north and a porch facing south. All the windows are lancets. There are cross finials on the east and west gables. Each of the chapels is recorded in the National Heritage List for England as a designated Grade II listed building.

== See also ==
- Listed buildings in Lancaster, Lancashire
- List of works by Sharpe and Paley
