= Sandra Kemp =

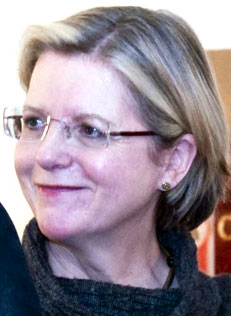
- Kemp in 2010
- Born: 10 March 1957 (age 69)
- Occupations: Director, The Ruskin – Museum and Research Institute, University of Lancaster

Sandra Kemp (born 10 March 1957) is an academic and curator with a background in English literature. She is the director of The Ruskin – Museum and Research Institute at the University of Lancaster and visiting professor in the Department of Materials at Imperial College London. She was previously a research associate at IMAGES&CO, and has held leadership roles in the university and cultural sectors, most recently as senior research fellow at the Victoria and Albert Museum, head of college, London College of Communication and director of research at the Royal College of Art (RCA). She curated the Wellcome Trust-sponsored exhibition Future Face: Image, Identity, Innovation at the Science Museum, with a related programme at the National Portrait Gallery, a film festival and a debate on BBC Radio 5 Live. She has also published and given public lectures in the fields of fiction, literary theory and cultural studies.

== Career ==
She has a Bachelor of Arts and DPhil from the University of Oxford. In her early career, she held academic posts in the English Literature departments of UK universities Southampton, Edinburgh, Glasgow, Westminster and had sabbaticals at Sapienza, Brown and Columbia.

In 2001, she moved to a management role, spending eight years as director of research at the Royal College of Art, leading the College to two successful RAEs. The 2007 Quality Assurance Agency (QAA) Institution Report cited as good practice the leadership, management and currency of research including research student and supervisor training. In the same year, Research Fortnight noted a 60% increase in the success rate of RCA applications to research councils.

From 2008 to 2012, she was head of college of the London College of Communication, where she led a major restructure of the college's academic portfolio and of its technical, administrative and financial operations.

She has also worked in the cultural sector, holding research fellowships at the National Portrait Gallery, Smithsonian Institution and the National Portrait Gallery, London, and most recently at the Victoria and Albert Museum (V&A). She has been on the advisory and management boards of the British Museum Centre for Visual and Material Culture, and the research centres at the V&A and Natural History Museum.

She has been a panel member of the Higher Education Funding Council for England (HEFCE) Research Assessment Exercise, and the Arts and Humanities Research Council’s Visual Arts and Media Panel.

She has appeared on television in the UK and abroad, including Omnibus and London Tonight, and broadcasts regularly, most recently on the BBC's Night Waves and Woman's Hour and on Chicago Public Radio's Odyssey.

== Exhibitions ==
She has curated a number of exhibitions. The subject of the human face formed the theme of her fellowships at the Smithsonian Institution and the National Portrait Gallery, London, and of the exhibition Future Face: Image, Identity, Innovation, funded by the Wellcome trust at the Science Museum and later in Taiwan and China. It investigated the way images of the face as a barcode of identity have been affected by advances in science and technology, and was accompanied by a special issue of New Scientist, reviewed in Nature and the BMJ and was the subject of radio and television programmes. She is on the curatorial team working on the exhibition The Future - A History at the V&A.

== Publications ==
She has published books, articles and critical editions of modernist fiction, including Virginia Woolf, Henry James, Rudyard Kipling, Wilkie Collins, Charlotte Brontë and the Oxford Companion to Edwardian Fiction (with David Trotter and Charlotte Mitchell). She has also published on feminism and literary theory, including an Oxford Reader with Judith Squires.

== Controversy ==
From 2008 to 2012 at LCC, she led a complete restructuring of the academic portfolio, and also undertook a financial review to eliminate a deficit of £1.4 million in addition to sector-wide substantial reductions in public funding. University proposals to close 16 courses in 2009 and a further 16 in 2012, leading to a significant number of redundant posts, were met with consistent opposition from the trade unions and calls for her resignation. A QAA investigation found that the university procedures the College followed were inadequate and that this had a detrimental impact on the courses being closed, though there was no ongoing risk to academic standards and quality. The university continued the restructuring, including further staff redundancies in the reorganisation of technical and administrative services. Widespread media coverage included publication of a leaked resignation letter of LCC Head of Communication Gillian Radcliffe criticising Kemp's management style and practices, on which the university refused to comment, noting the availability of its own grievance and internal procedures.

In March 2012, the Rector Nigel Carrington announced in an all-staff email published by the Times Higher Education that she had resigned due to "sustained media coverage" making her position untenable. He stated that she had "successfully completed" the first stage of restructuring, "balanced the budgets and in 2011 achieved a significant increase in the College's National Student Survey scores".
