= Spennymoor Grammar School =

Former school in County Durham, England

Spennymoor Grammar School (also known as Alderman Wraith Grammar School, Durham Road School or Tudhoe Grange School) was a selective state school in County Durham:

== History ==
It opened in 1922, went through several name changes and finally closed in 2015.

== Notable former pupils ==
- Sir Percy Cradock, British diplomat, civil servant and sinologist, Ambassador to China from 1978 to 1983
- Eric Gates, striker for Ipswich Town
- John McManners, British clergyman and historian of religion
- Bruce Oldfield, fashion designer (briefly)
- Dave Parnaby, football manager
- Jack Scott, BBC weather forecaster
- John Walton, Baron Walton of Detchant (formerly Sir John Walton), neuroscientist
- Peter Willis, former association football referee
- James Woodward, Principal of Sarum College
