= Ravensbourne University London =

University in Greenwich, England

- Former names: Ravensbourne College of Design and Communication
- Motto: We learn with industry, industry learns with us, and together we transform lives.
- Type: Public
- Established: 1962
- Vice-Chancellor: Jon Kingsbury
- Academic staff: 140
- Students: 8,685 (2024/25)
- Undergraduates: (2024/25)
- Postgraduates: 1,700 (2024/25)
- Location: London, England
- Website: ravensbourne.ac.uk

Ravensbourne University London is a public university on the Greenwich Peninsula in London, England. It specialises in creative, business, and technology-related disciplines, offering courses in areas including fashion, television and broadcasting, business management, architecture, product and graphic design, animation, music and sound production, and digital technology.

The university delivers an industry-focused curriculum developed in collaboration with employers to reflect current professional practices. Its partnerships with industry organisations provide students with opportunities for project-based learning, placements, and access to professional-standard facilities.

Ravensbourne University London has a focus on widening social mobility in higher education, and its graduates work across a range of roles with the creative, business and technology industries.

Ravensbourne University London was established in 1962 by the amalgamation of Bromley School of Art, Sidcup School of Art and Beckenham School of Art. It was originally at Bromley Common and later at Chislehurst and on the Greenwich Peninsula in Inner London, where it opened a new campus in autumn 2010. The college is named after the River Ravensbourne, which flows from Bromley Common to Greenwich. Initially established as a institution providing higher-level courses in art and design, it was given university status in 2018.

== History ==
Bromley School of Art opened in 1878 in a new building in Tweedy Road, Bromley that later became Bromley Library; after the Second World War it became Bromley College of Art. In 1959 it became Bromley Technical College after a merger with the Department of Furniture Design of Beckenham School of Art, which dated to the turn of the century as a technical school, had become an art school in purpose-built accommodation in 1908, and had expanded after the war with crafts trades. In July 1962, the remainder of Beckenham School of Art merged with Bromley College of Art and Sidcup School of Art (founded in 1898 and by then also known as Sidcup Art College) to form Ravensbourne College of Art and Design. In 1965 the college moved to Rookery Lane, Bromley Common. That site had originally housed the Rookery, an 18th-century house that had been burnt out while in military occupation in 1946. As the college expanded it was unable to develop that site any further, as it was in the Metropolitan Green Belt. In 1975 the college moved most of its operations to a purpose-built building designed after lengthy consultation on 18 acres (7.3 ha) of private parkland on Walden Road, Chislehurst (51.4205°N 0.0537°E). The Rookery Lane site was redeveloped for the Bromley College of Further & Higher Education.

In 1983 the National Advisory Body for Local Authority Higher Education was set up by the Secretary of State for Education and Science, and demanded a 10 per cent cut in higher education spending across the sector. At Ravensbourne this was interpreted as requiring the closure of a department, with the communications and television broadcasting course at the College initially earmarked to be discontinued as it was on a separate campus and the closure would have allowed the College to consolidate its properties. This was later changed to a decision to cut the Fine Art course at the College on the grounds that there was a large number of similar courses offered elsewhere in the region, and this closure occurred later that year. As a result, the college was renamed to Ravensbourne College of Design and Communication. In 1991 the communications and television broadcasting course department was moved to the main Chislehurst campus from its Wharton Road, Bromley site, now occupied by St Timothy's Mews housing development.

Ravensbourne offers courses in business, technology, and creative-related disciplines. It was amongst the earliest of institutions to be approved by the then CNAA to convert the traditional Diploma programmes in Art and Design into honours degrees during the 1970s. In April 1989 it became a Higher Education Corporation. Following the demise of the CNAA in 1992, Ravensbourne entered into a validating partnership with the Royal College of Art, which agreed exceptionally to take this responsibility. This validation ceased when the Royal College of Art withdrew from offering collaborative provision. Ravensbourne was recognised as an affiliate College of the University of Sussex in 1996, and was re-recognised in 2002. Between 2009 and 2012 the institution's undergraduate and postgraduate provision was validated by City University, London. This relationship was maintained until May 2012. In June 2013 University of the Arts London became the validating partner. In August 2017, Ravensbourne was granted the right to award its own degrees, and in May 2018 it gained university status, becoming Ravensbourne University London.

In 2019 Ravensbourne began validating courses at the City and Guilds of London Art School located in Kennington in central London.

=== Rave on Air ===
In 1971 the Broadcasting Department instituted Rave on Air, an annual student-run broadcasting event.

Since 2025, the university has hosted Ravensbourne on Record, an industry-focused podcast in which educators and industry leaders discuss how universities can connect with the creative, technology and business sectors to drive social change, innovation and growth.

== Campus ==
The university moved its entire operations to its current campus on the Greenwich Peninsula, which opened in autumn 2010. The campus was designed by Farshid Moussavi and won a British Construction Industry Award and the RIBA education and community award. In 2021, Barozzi Veiga designed a new building for Institute for Creativity and Technology. This aluminium-clad building is the first building to open in the Design District on the Greenwich Peninsula.

== Curriculum and reputation ==
Ravensbourne holds a TEF Silver Award for teaching quality.

As a skills-based university, it does not participate in university ranking schemes.

Ravensbourne offers undergraduate, postgraduate and further education programmes taught across three buildings at its campus on the Greenwich Peninsula, next to the O2.

At undergraduate level, the university provides top-up programmes, and bachelor's degrees (BA, BSc, and BEng) in a range of creative, business and technology subjects. The available postgraduate provision consists of Master's level courses, each of which can be studied to MA, MFA, MBA, MArch or MSc (dependent on subject). A variety of subject areas are offered within the main disciplines of creative, business and technology.

== Notable alumni ==
- Ray Atkins, artist
- Brian Barnes, artist
- Rafael Bettega, assistant editor
- Deirdre Borlase, artist
- David Bowie, musician and actor
- Joshua "Zerkaa" Bradley, YouTuber
- Dinos Chapman, artist
- Maria Cornejo, fashion designer
- Beryl Dean, embroiderer
- Daniel Eatock, artist and designer
- Mary Farmer (Beckenham School of Art), textile artist and former Tapestry Course Director, Royal College of Art
- Rose Finn-Kelcey, artist
- Nazaneen Ghaffar, weather presenter, Sky News
- Will "Wilbur Soot" Gold, YouTuber and musician
- Robert Hewison, literary scholar
- Richard Howarth, Vice President, Design at Apple
- Peter James, writer and film producer
- Andrew Kötting, artist and film maker
- John Leckie, record producer
- Ophelia Liu, makeup artist and content creator
- Anthony McCall, artist
- Stella McCartney, fashion designer
- Jasper Morrison, product designer
- Phil Mulloy, film maker and animator
- Bruce Oldfield, fashion designer
- Chris Orr, artist
- Jay Osgerby, product and furniture designer
- Andi Osho, comedian
- Tim Pope, film director
- Bruce Pennington, artist
- Charlotte Regan, film director
- Ceri Sampson, creative director
- Elle Tennyson, artist
- Carol Tulloch, Professor of Dress, Diaspora and Transnationalism
- Gareth Unwin, film producer
- Clare Waight Keller, fashion designer
- Alison Wilding, sculptor

== Notable faculty ==
- Jeremy Gardiner
- Armin Medosch

== See also ==
- Armorial of UK universities
- List of art universities and colleges in Europe
- List of universities in the UK
- Visual arts education
