= Robert Hewison =

British art historian (born 1943)

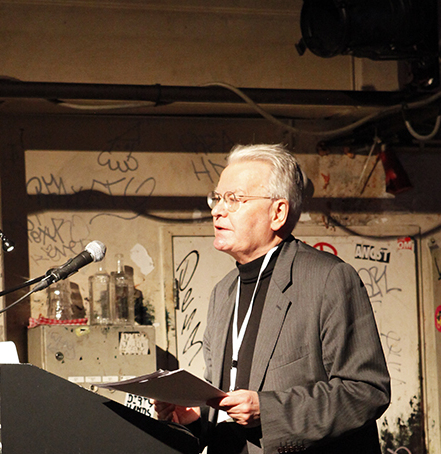
Robert Hewison, 2014

Robert Alwyn Petrie Hewison (born 2 June 1943) is a British cultural historian.

He was educated at Bedford School, Ravensbourne College of Art and Design, and Brasenose College, Oxford, where he graduated BA in 1965, MA in 1970, MLitt in 1972, and DLitt in 1989.

For most of his professional life he has made a living as a freelance writer and curator and he has written for The Sunday Times since 1981. Among his academic appointments he was visiting professor at De Montfort University from 1993 until 1995; he then held a number of appointments at the University of Lancaster as Professor in Literary and Cultural Studies (1995–2000), part-time professor in the Department of English (2001). He was Slade Professor of Fine Art in the University of Oxford 1999/2000, lecturing on the subject 'Ruskin To-day'. From 2005 to 2012 he was Professor of Cultural Policy and Leadership Studies at City University, London. Currently he is an honorary professor at the Ruskin Centre, Lancaster University. He is currently chair of Ruskin To-Day, the informal co-ordinating committee for the celebration of Ruskin’s bicentenary in 2019, Ruskin200.

In an interview, Michael Palin (his contemporary at Brasenose) credited Hewison with introducing him to the idea of earning a living by making people laugh, and for pushing him into performing, which, Palin said, he would never have done without encouragement as he was too shy.

== Publications ==
- Passport to Peckham: Culture and Creativity in a London Village (Goldsmiths Press, 2022)
- John Ruskin: Giotto and his works in Padua [introduction by Robert Hewison] (David Zwirner Books, 2018)
- Ruskin and his Contemporaries (Pallas Athene, 2018)
- Cultural Capital: The Rise and Fall of Creative Britain (Verso, 2014)
- (with Chris Orr), Chris Orr: The Making of Things (Royal Academy Publications, 2013)
- John Byrne: Art & Life (Lund Humphries, 2011)
- (with John Holden), The Cultural Leadership Handbook: How to run a Creative Organization (Gower, 2011)
- Ruskin on Venice: The Paradise of Cities (Yale University Press, 2009)
- John Ruskin (Oxford: Oxford University Press, 2007)
- (with John Holden), Experience and experiment: the UK Branch of the Calouste Gulbenkian Foundation, 1956-2006 (London: Calouste Gulbenkian Foundation, United Kingdom Branch, 2006)
- Edited, "There is no wealth but life": Ruskin in the 21st century (Lancaster: Ruskin Foundation, 2006)
- Not a sideshow: leadership and cultural value: a matrix for change (London: Demos, 2006)
- Chris Orr's John Ruskin and other stories, 14 October-23 December 2004 (Lancaster: Ruskin Library, Lancaster University, 2004)
- (with John Holden), The right to art: making aspirations reality (London: Demos, 2004)
- An address delivered in Saint Andrew's Church, Coniston, on the centenary of the death of John Ruskin, by Robert Hewison, Slade Professor of fine art in the University of Oxford, 20 January 2000 (Great Britain: Cygnet Press, 2003)
- (with Ian Warrell and Stephen Wildman), Ruskin, Turner and the Pre-Raphaelites (London: Tate Gallery, 2000)
- Edited, Ruskin's artists: studies in the Victorian visual economy: papers from the Ruskin Programme, Lancaster University (Aldershot: Ashgate, 2000)
- Ruskin's Venice (London: Pilkington, 2000)
- Towards 2010: new times, new challenges for the arts (London: The Arts Council of England, 2000)
- Ruskin and Oxford: the art of education (Oxford: Clarendon Press, 1996)
- Culture and Consensus: England, Art and Politics Since 1940 (London: Methuen, 1995, revised edn 1997)
- Future tense: a new art for the nineties (London: Methuen, 1990)
- The heritage industry: Britain in a climate of decline (London: Methuen London, 1987)
- Too much: art and society in the Sixties, 1960-75 (London: Methuen, 1986)
- John Ruskin, edited, with an introduction, notes, and appendix by Robert Hewison, Catalogue of the Rudimentary Series: in the arrangement of 1873 with Ruskin's comments of 1878 (London: Lion and Unicorn, 1984)
- Footlights!: a hundred years of Cambridge comedy (London: Methuen London, 1983)
- Art and Society: Ruskin in Sheffield 1876 (London: Published for the Guild of St George by Brentham, 1981)
- In anger: culture in the Cold War, 1945-60 (London: Weidenfeld & Nicolson, 1981, revised edn London: Methuen, 1988)
- Monty Python: the case against: irreverence, scurrility, profanity, vilification and licentious abuse (London: Methuen, 1981)
- Edited, New approaches to Ruskin: thirteen essays (London: Routledge & Kegan Paul, 1981)
- Under siege: literary life in London 1939-45 (London: Weidenfeld & Nicolson, 1977, Newton Abbot: Readers Union, 1978, London: Quartet Books, 1979, revised edn London: Methuen, 1988)
- Ruskin and Venice (London: Thames and Hudson, 1978)
- John Ruskin: the argument of the eye (London: Thames and Hudson; Princeton: Princeton University Press, 1976)
