= Deirdre Borlase =

British artist

- Born: 1925; Dulwich, London
- Died: 2018 (aged 92–93)
- Education: Bromley School of Art; Royal College of Art
- Known for: Painting
- Spouse: Frederick Brill

Deirdre Borlase (1925–2018) was a British painter and printmaker.

== Biography ==
Borlase was born at Dulwich in London and grew up Margate, where her father was a plumber. She studied at the Bromley School of Art between 1940 and 1944 and then at the Royal College of Art in London for a further two years. After graduating she taught at the Harrow School of Art for two years and then at the Kingston School of Art until 1950. After a career break, Borlase returned to art in 1967, creating landscapes of Venice and, later, of Carperby in north Yorkshire where the family had a cottage from 1961. She was commissioned for six paintings by St Luke's Hospital in Bradford. As well as painting Borlase took up print making after taking a course at Morley College in 1977 and in the 1990s began experimenting with computer graphics and also decorating furniture. Borlase was a frequent exhibitor at the Royal Academy in London and in group shows. She had a solo show at the David Thompson Gallery in 1979 and exhibited on a regular basis at the Broughton House Gallery in Cambridge from 1989. Later she regularly showed new work with the Zillah Bell Gallery in Thirsk.

While a student at the Royal College of Art, Borlase met, and later married, the artist Frederick Brill, (1920–1984), who became the principal of the Chelsea Art School. The couple's work was subject of a two person exhibition in 1986 and featured in the 1993 exhibition Relative Values at the Smith Art Gallery and Museum in Stirling. Borlase's paintings featured in the exhibition The Secret to a Good Life which opened at the Royal Academy in September 2018, some months after she died. The exhibition was curated by one of her three children, the artist Bob and Roberta Smith.
