= Bruce Oldfield =

British fashion designer (born 1950)

Bruce Oldfield OBE
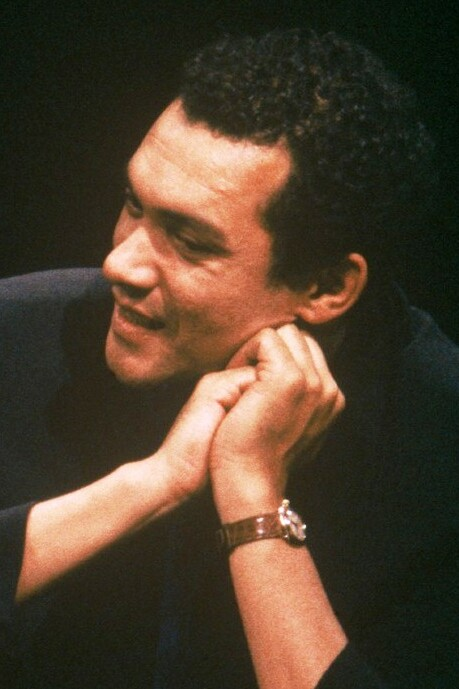
- Oldfield appearing on TV series After Dark in 1988
- Born: 14 July 1950 (age 76)
- Occupation: Fashion designer
- Website: Official website

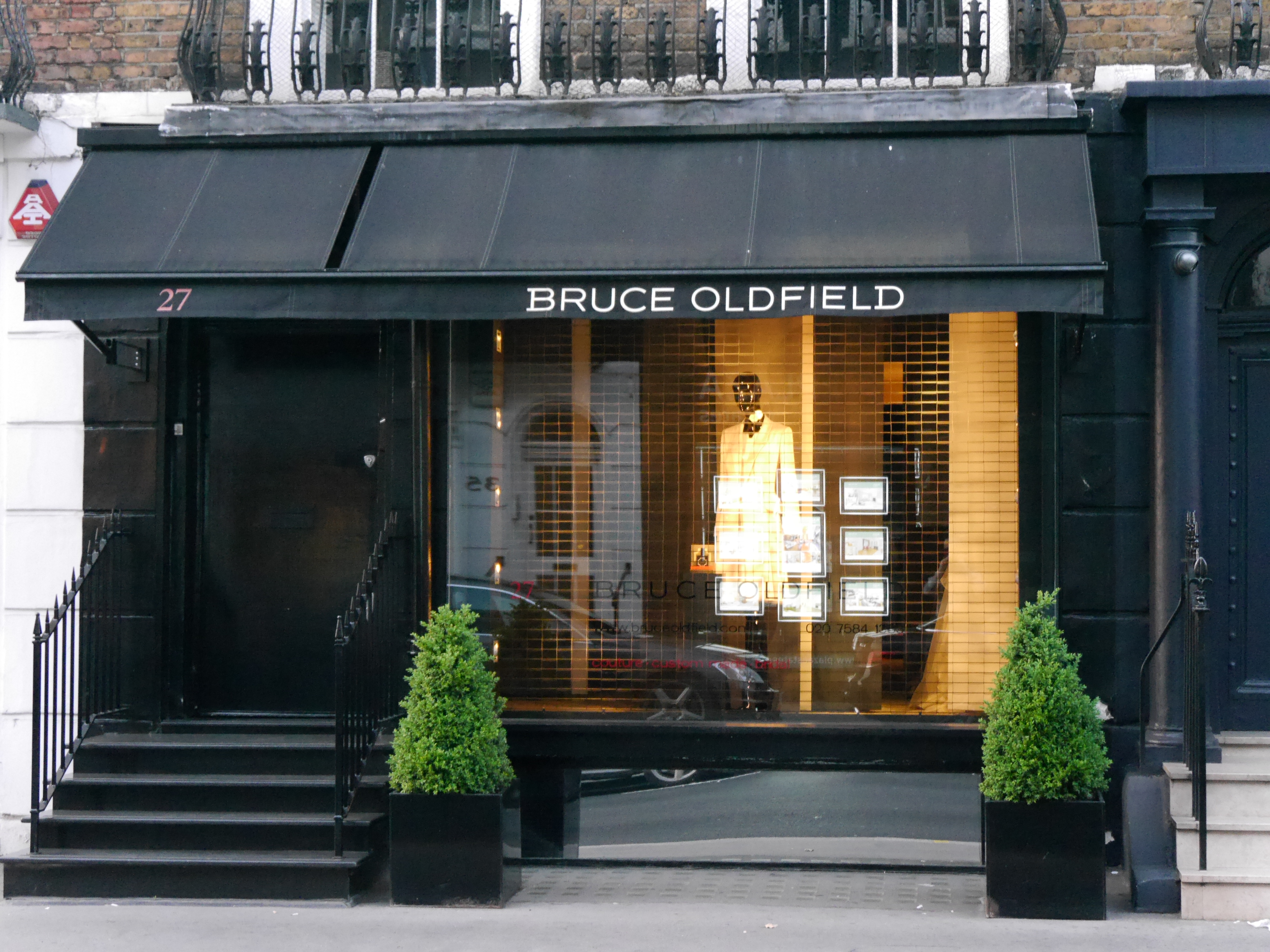
Bruce Oldfield store, Beauchamp Place, London (2016)

Bruce Oldfield, OBE (born 14 July 1950) is a British fashion designer, best known for his couture occasionwear. Notable clients have included Sienna Miller, Catherine Zeta-Jones, Diana Ross, Charlotte Rampling, Jerry Hall, Joan Collins, Diana, Princess of Wales, Queen Noor of Jordan, Queen Camilla, the Duchess of Edinburgh and Queen Rania of Jordan.

== Early life ==
Oldfield was brought up and educated in the care of children's charity, Barnardo's (his father, whom he never knew, had migrated to Britain from Jamaica). Between the ages of 1 and 13, Oldfield was placed in foster care where he was brought up by a seamstress who sparked his love for designing and making clothes.

In 1963, age the age of 13, Oldfield moved to West Mount, a Dr Barnardo's Children's Home, in Ripon. Four years later, Oldfield moved out of West Mount and lodged with a couple in Harrogate.

In 1961, Oldfield passed the 11-plus and began to attend Spennymoor Grammar School. He was later educated at Ripon Grammar School, Sheffield City College of Education (now Sheffield Hallam University), and Ravensbourne College in London.

In 1973, he graduated from St. Martin's School of Art, London, to critical acclaim. That year he staged his first one-man show for Henri Bendel, later returning to London to show his first collection.

== Career ==
In 1975, the Bruce Oldfield label was born with the launch of ready-to-wear collections for European and American stores. He began making couture clothes, in 1978, for individual clients and from 1980 for Diana, Princess of Wales. In 1984, he opened his first shop selling ready-to-wear and couture to an international clientele. During the 1980s, he also designed shoes for couture house Rayne.

In 2009, he opened a second premises in Beauchamp Place dedicated to weddings, incorporating wedding dresses, veils, and a full range of bridal accessories.

In 1990, Oldfield was appointed an Officer of the Order of the British Empire (OBE) for services to the fashion industry; and, in 2004, his autobiography Rootless was published. He has honorary fellowships to the Royal College of Art and the Universities of Durham and Sheffield, was governor of The London Institute (1999–2001) and a trustee of the Royal Academy of Arts (2000–02).

Oldfield received honorary doctorates from the University of Northumbria in 2001, and from the University of Central England in 2005. He is also a vice-president of Barnardo's.

In 2005, it was reported that Oldfield was a supporter of the Conservative Party.

In April 2013, Camilla, then Duchess of Cornwall, wore a pale powder-blue Bruce Oldfield dress to the inauguration ceremony for King Willem-Alexander of the Netherlands.

In 2023, Oldfield was chosen by Queen Camilla to design her coronation gown.
