= Newfield, Bishop Auckland =

Coordinates: 54.6974°N 1.6829°W

Newfield
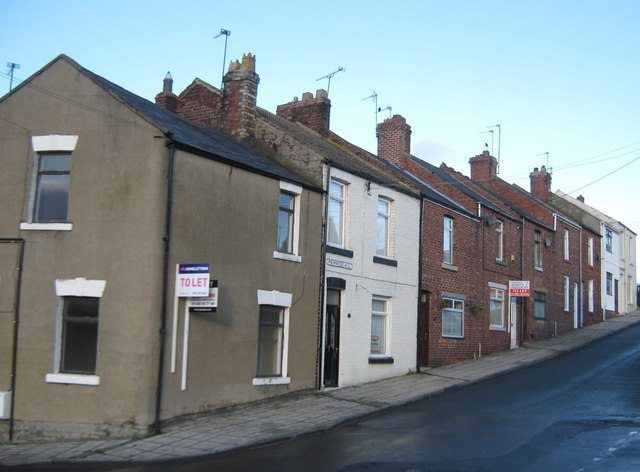

- Location within County Durham
- Population: 368 (2001 census)
- Unitary authority: County Durham
- Ceremonial county: Durham
- Region: North East
- Country: England
- Sovereign state: United Kingdom

Newfield is a village and former civil parish in the County Durham district, in the ceremonial county of Durham, England. It is situated to the south of Willington, near Bishop Auckland. In the 2001 census Newfield had a population of 368.

== Civil parish ==
Newfield was formerly a township in the parish of Auckland, St. Andrew, from 1866 Newfield was a civil parish in its own right, on 1 April 1937 the parish was abolished and merged with Bishop Auckland, part also went to form Spennymoor. In 1931 the parish had a population of 998.
