= Ripley School Chapel =

- Location in Lancaster
- 54.0396°N 2.8006°W
- Location: Ashton Road, Lancaster, Lancashire, England
- OS grid reference: SD 477,607

History
- Built: 1886–88
- Built for: Thomas Ripley

Site notes
- Architect: Paley and Austin
- Architectural style: Gothic Revival
- Governing body: Ripley St Thomas Church of England Academy

Listed Building – Grade II*
- Designated: 18 February 1970
- Reference no.: 1194928

Ripley School Chapel is part of what is now the Ripley St Thomas Church of England Academy, located in Ashton Road, Lancaster, Lancashire, England. It is considered to be of architectural importance and is recorded in the National Heritage List for England as a designated Grade II* listed building. (Note: Grade II* is the middle of the three categories of grading and is applied to buildings that are "particularly important buildings of more than special interest".)

== History ==
The school was originally built as a charitable orphanage and school, known as the Ripley Hospital, and was intended particularly for children whose fathers had been lost at sea. It was paid for from the legacy of Thomas Ripley, a merchant who died in 1852, to build such a school along the lines of the Bluecoat School in Liverpool. The building was commissioned by Ripley's widow, Julia. The foundation stone was laid on 14 July 1856, and the building was completed eight years later, being opened on 3 November 1864 by the Rt Revd James Prince Lee, Bishop of Manchester. Julia Ripley died in 1881, having set up a trust to pay for extensions to the school, which included a chapel. The chapel was designed by the local architects Paley and Austin in 1884–85, and built in 1886–88. It was opened and dedicated by the Bishop of Liverpool on 3 November 1888.

== Architecture ==
=== Exterior ===
The chapel stands to the east of the school buildings, and is approached by an arcaded walkway. It is constructed in sandstone. On the exterior this is formed into polygonal blocks to match the other school buildings. The stone on the exterior is said to be local, while that on the interior is said to be from Storeton, (then in Cheshire). The chapel is roofed with Westmorland slate, and is in Gothic Revival style. Its plan consists of a nave and chancel under a continuous roof, a south aisle, a north vestry and organ chamber at the east end acting as a transept, and a northwest porch. At the junction of the nave and the chancel is an octagonal flèche. This has an open timber bell stage with a balcony, and contains a single bell; it is surmounted by a weathervane. On the north side of the church, between the nave and the chancel, is a projecting stair turret. This has a flat top, and a parapet decorated with chequerwork. The tracery in the windows is in a fusion of Decorated and Perpendicular styles.

=== Interior ===
The chapel is the size of a parish church, seating 400 people. At the west end is a narthex, divided from the body of the church by an oak screen. The interior is asymmetrical, with a three-bay south arcade between the nave and the aisle. In the transept, the vestry is at the lower level, with the organ above. The furnishings were designed by C. Blades, and carved by John Jackson. The choir stalls are particularly elaborate, with traceried canopies, and the seats have finials in the shape of lollipops. (Note: Brandwood et al describe this as "some of the richest woodwork that the practice ever produced".) The oak pulpit stands on a sandstone base, and the pews are also in oak. The east and west windows contain stained glass by Shrigley and Hunt. In the narthex are white marble busts of Thomas and Julia Ripley, and brasses to their memory. The three-manual pipe organ was built in 1888 by Wilkinson and Sons of Kendal, and was overhauled in 1988 by Corkhill of Keighley.

== See also ==
- Grade II* listed buildings in Lancashire
- Listed buildings in Lancaster, Lancashire
- List of ecclesiastical works by Paley and Austin
