= Ripley St Thomas Church of England Academy =

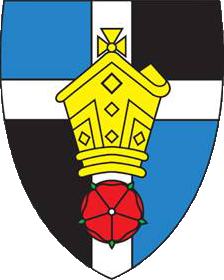

Location
- Ashton Road; Lancaster, Lancashire, LA1 4RS; England
- 54.0393°N 2.8018°W

Information
- Type: Academy
- Motto: Believe
- Religious affiliation: Church of England
- Established: 1864
- Founder: Thomas & Julia Ripley
- Department for Education URN: 136731 Tables
- Ofsted: Reports
- Chief Governor: Julie Hodgson
- Executive headteacher: Sally Kenyon
- Co-headteachers: Helen Best, Alexia Barnes
- Chaplain: Michael Reynolds
- Staff: 150
- Years taught: Year 7 – Year 13
- Gender: Mixed
- Age range: 11-18
- Enrolment: 1650 inc. 350 sixth form
- Schedule: Five 1 hour periods, 30 minutes form / assembly, 15 minutes break and 45 minutes lunch
- Hours in school day: 6
- Houses: Blackburn, Chester, Durham, York, Carlisle
- Colour
- School fees: Free
- Publication: Believe..... magazine
- Alumni organisation: The Ripley Association
- Website: www.ripleystthomas.com

Ripley St Thomas Church of England Academy is a mixed Church of England high school operating under academy status, in the city of Lancaster in the north west of England. The school has over 1700 pupils between 11 and 18 years old, 350 of whom are part of the sixth form.

== History ==
The school started as Ripley Hospital, founded by Julia, wife of Thomas Ripley, a merchant who traded in Lancaster and Liverpool. Thomas Ripley was born in Lancaster in 1791, and had been an apprentice to a grocer and linen draper. In 1811 he went into business in Lancaster with his brother, but moved to Liverpool in 1818 after a bankruptcy. From there he traded with China, and with the East Indies, and much of his wealth stems from the fact that he was one of the first English merchants to do so. As a devout Christian, he was keen to establish a charity hospital, modelled on the Liverpool Blue Coat School. Having no children, on his death in 1852 he left a considerable sum of money in trust to establish the Ripley Hospital to cater to fatherless children, especially those whose fathers had been lost at sea.

On 3 November 1864, it was designated to educate an equal number of boys and girls – 300 in total – providing they lived within either 15 miles (24 km) of Lancaster Priory or 7 miles (11 km) of Liverpool Cathedral.

In September 1996, Ripley was designated a Language College.

== Today ==
As of June 2026, Helen Best and Alexia Barnes serve as co-headteachers.

The farm has been the subject of media attention, with features from BBC North West Tonight, BBC Songs of Praise and Newsround, all of which praised the school on the 'Farm to Fork' initiative, as the farm provides produce for the school kitchen. The school appeared on CBBC's Blue Peter on 6 September 2012, with the programme also focusing on the 'Farm to Fork' initiative.

Ripley St Thomas has been approved as a Technology college, adding to the Language status. This means students must take at least one language and at least one technology course, e.g. Food Technology or Mechanical Technology at GCSE, continuing the curriculum students experience from Year 7.

In January 2012, an Ofsted report rated the school overall as "Outstanding", the highest of four achievable Ofsted grades. The grade of "Outstanding" was also assigned in all 33 of the areas assessed by Ofsted.

In December 2022, an Ofsted report rated the school overall as "Outstanding", the highest of four achievable Ofsted grades. The grade of "Outstanding" was also assigned in all 33 of the areas assessed by Ofsted, this was after Ofsted made changes to their policy.

In 2017, the Music Department was awarded the Music Teacher Awards for Excellence's award for Best School Music Department.

== GCSE and A level results ==
Ripley St Thomas achieves outstanding results for GCSE and A level students every year, far outweighing the local authority and national average. The results for 5 or more A* to C including English and Maths has risen from 85% in 2010, to 89% in 2011, 31% higher than the national average.

== Academy status onwards ==
On Sunday 1 May 2011, Ripley St Thomas became the third high school in Lancaster to be granted Academy status by the Secretary of State, and was re-designated as "Ripley St Thomas Church of England Academy". The company has been registered with Companies House and an Academy Trust has been set up to run the company.

== Notable former students ==
- Rob Bale - Olympic swimmer

== See also ==
- Ripley School Chapel
