= Centre for Environmental Data Analysis =

UK organisation

- Abbreviation: CEDA
- Legal status: Government Organisation
- Purpose: Support Environmental Science by aiding data access, data archival and data analysis
- Headquarters: Rutherford Appleton Laboratory
- Location: Chilton, Oxfordshire
- Region served: United Kingdom
- Website: www.ceda.ac.uk

The Centre for Environmental Data Analysis (CEDA) is a United Kingdom organisation that serves the environmental science community by provision of data centres, data analysis, data access and research project participation.

== Data centres ==
The CEDA Archive is responsible for archiving data from NERC funder projects in the Atmospheric sciences and Earth Observation. The CEDA Archive was formed from the amalgamation of the BADC and NEODC. The Archive is principally funded by the Natural Environment Research Council (NERC) and Science and Technology Facilities Council (STFC).

== Data access ==
CEDA is responsible for providing access to research data. Particular datasets may have different access or license restrictions. Many datasets are available under the United Kingdom Open Government License (OGL).

== JASMIN ==
CEDA operates The Joint Analysis System Meeting Infrastructure Needs super-data-cluster (JASMIN) e-infrastructure in collaboration with STFC's Scientific Computing Department. In 2017 the total storage capacity of the cluster was increased to 20 petabytes (PB).

The four JASMIN sites are Rutherford Appleton Laboratory, Bristol, Reading and Leeds linked over the JANET network. Remote paths linked by lightpaths are Edinburgh, the Met Office in Exeter and the Royal Netherlands Meteorological Institute (KNMI) in the Netherlands.
