= The Ruskin, Lancaster =

Research centre at the University of Lancaster, England

The Ruskin – Museum and Research Institute
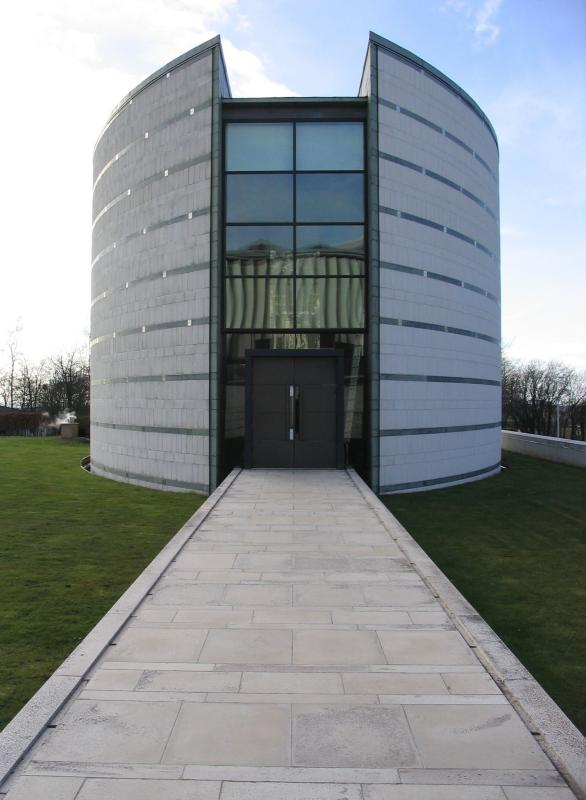
- The Ruskin – Museum and Research Institute
- 54.0101197888021°N 2.7878114268054732°W
- Location: Lancaster, England

The Ruskin – Museum and Research Institute is an archive, museum, and research institute at Lancaster University, in Lancaster, Lancashire, the north-west of England. The Director of The Ruskin is Professor Sandra Kemp. Formerly named 'The Ruskin – Library, Museum and Research Centre' was also previously known as the 'Ruskin Library' pre-2019.

The Ruskin is home to The Ruskin Whitehouse Collection, the world's largest assemblage of works by artist, writer, environmentalist and social thinker John Ruskin (1819–1900), and his circle. The collection is on display in The Ruskin building at Lancaster University, designed for the collection by Sir Richard MacCormac, and Brantwood, Ruskin's house, garden and estate on Coniston Water. The Collection was purchased by University of Lancaster in 2019, with support from the National Heritage Memorial Fund. The Ruskin launched on 26 September 2019 with the exhibition, ‘Ruskin: Museum of the Near Future’, to mark the bicentenary of Ruskin's birth in 1819. The building was designated as a Grade II listed building by Historic England on 2 October 2026.

In 2021, Lancaster University announced that The Ruskin would close until 2024 to enable planned capital works to take place. During the temporary closure, The Ruskin's programmes of exhibitions, events, research and learning are taking place digitally and off-site.

== The Ruskin Whitehouse Collection ==
The Ruskin Whitehouse Collection was formed by the educationalist and Liberal MP, John Howard Whitehouse (1873–1955). It is the most extensive collection of Ruskin's works in the world, and the most widely consulted because of its depth and range.

The collection contains thousands of paintings, drawings and diagrams, letters and manuscripts, photographs and daguerreotypes, a library – including Ruskin's own collection – and a complete repository of critical writing on Ruskin. Every aspect of Ruskin's polymathic interests are represented, from architecture and the arts, to political economy and the natural sciences.

=== 2019 purchase ===
In 2019, the purchase of The Ruskin Whitehouse Collection at Lancaster University was funded by the Education Trust Limited and the Whitehouse Trust and with the support of the National Heritage Memorial Fund; Art Fund; Garfield Weston Foundation; Bowland Trust; Friends of the National Libraries; John R Murray Charitable Trust; Guild of St George; Aldama Foundation; Pilgrim Trust; and the Cohen Foundation.

== The building ==
Designed by Sir Richard MacCormac of MacCormac Jamieson Prichard, it was opened in 1998 by Princess Alexandra, The Hon Lady Ogilvy. It subsequently won the Independent on Sunday Building of the Year Award 1996, the Royal Fine Art Commission/BSkyB Building of the Year University Winner 1998, and Millennium Products status awarded by the Design Council in 1999.

== Activities ==
The Collection is loaned to institutions internationally, across Europe, America and East Asia.

The Ruskin offers a programme of temporary exhibitions, talks, lectures and performances, and creative workshops for all ages. Since 2020, these have taken place digitally.

The Ruskin Whitehouse Collection is used in learning programmes taking place at Lancaster University, local schools and colleges, and continuing education, led by museum staff.

The Ruskin Research Institute is integrated with The Ruskin's public-facing programme, producing ‘live’ research in partnership with its communities, and through its established seminar series and journal.

== See also ==
- Listed buildings in Lancaster, Lancashire (outer areas)
