= Nottingham Weather Centre =

- Organization: Met Office
- Location: Watnall, Nottinghamshire, United Kingdom
- Coordinates: 53°00′20″N 1°15′06″W
- Altitude: 117 m or 384 ft
- Weather: Average temperature: 10.1 °C (50.2 °F) (Note: Average temperature was calculated by finding the mean between the average annual maximum temperature and the average annual minimum temperature during the period of 1991–2020.)
- Established: 1941; 85 years ago
- Commercial telescopes: Template:Commercial telescopes}

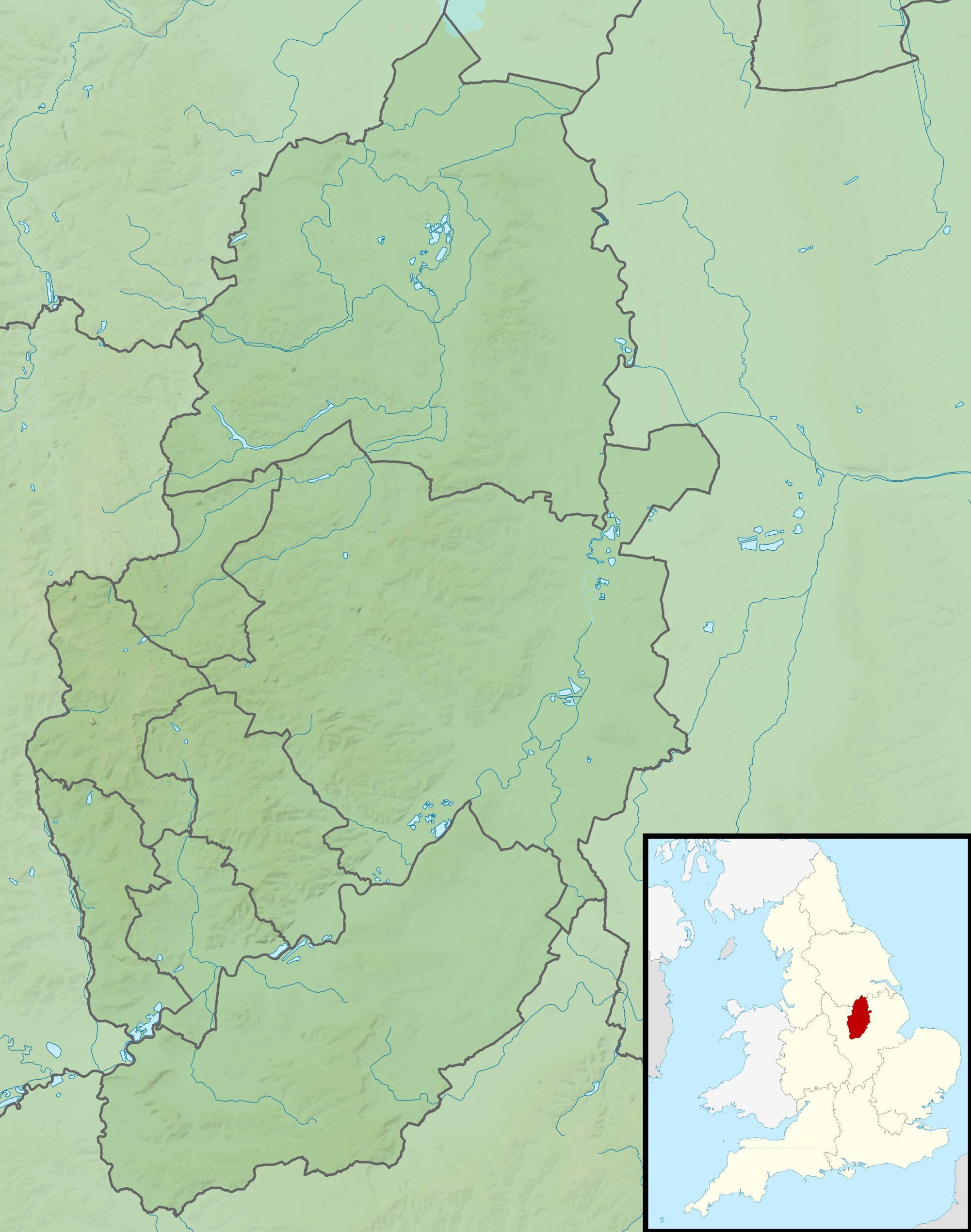
Station shown within Nottinghamshire.

The Nottingham Weather Centre (also referred to Nottingham Watnall) is a functioning observation and weather station located in Watnall, Nottinghamshire in England. The weather station is located 5.6 miles (9.0 km) from the city centre of Nottingham, and is the closest weather station to Nottingham with observations.

The weather station was established in 1941 and like many other weather stations in the United Kingdom, the recording of weather observations began in January 1960. The weather centre is currently being managed by the Met Office. The station's WMO classification index is 03354.

== Climate ==
As the weather station is located at a higher elevation of 117 m or 384 ft, temperatures are usually cooler than the city centre of Nottingham and the Sutton Bonington weather station, as these locations are situated on a lower elevation.

During the period of 1991–2020, the Nottingham Weather Centre lay within hardiness zone 9a and within the AHS heat zone 2. For the periods of 1961–1990 and 1971–2000 the station lied within the hardiness zone 8b, as the average annual minimum temperature was below −6.7 °C (19.9 °F) during those periods.
