= Poppyhead (carving) =

Carved finial or decorative motif on church furniture

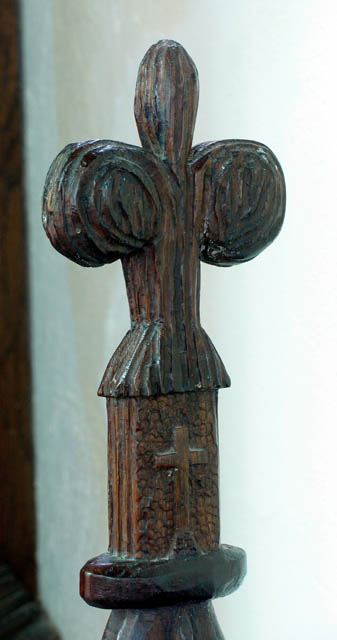
Poppyhead carved as a stylised fleur-de-lys in St Peter's Church, Neatishead

Poppyhead is a form of carving of the top of the end of a bench or a choir stall. Its name is unrelated to the poppy flower. It is derived, by way of Old French, from the Latin word puppis, which means the poop or the figurehead of a ship. In its simplest, and its most usual form, it has the appearance of a stylised fleur-de-lys. In some cases, it consists of a much more intricate carving; for example in Holy Trinity Church, Blythburgh, some of the poppyheads represent the seven deadly sins.

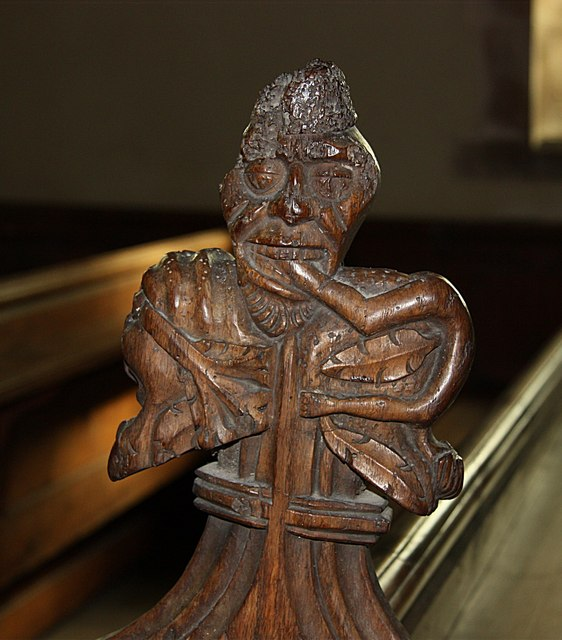
Poppyhead carved as a Green Man
