= Henry Roy Dean =

English pathologist (1879–1961)

Professor Henry Roy Dean FRCP
- Born: 19 February 1879; Bournemouth, Hampshire, England
- Died: 13 February 1961 (aged 81); Cambridge, England
- Education: New College, Oxford
- Known for: Department of Pathology of the University of Cambridge; Master of Trinity Hall, Cambridge
- Scientific career
- Fields: Medicine (Pathology)
- Workplaces: Lister Institute; University of Sheffield; University of Manchester; University of Cambridge

Henry Roy Dean (19 February 1879 – 13 February 1961), also known as Prof. H. R. Dean, was a professor of Pathology at the University of Cambridge and Master of Trinity Hall, Cambridge.

== Biography ==
Henry Roy Dean was born in Bournemouth, Hampshire (now Dorset), England to Joshua Dean and Elizabeth Dean, née MacCormac. Elizabeth Dean was a member of a distinguished Northern Irish medical family and she was the daughter of Henry MacCormac and the sister of Sir William MacCormac. Dean was educated at Sherborne School and he attended with first-class honours the School of Natural Science at New College, Oxford, to be graduated MB BCh in 1904, after medical training at St Thomas' Hospital, where he was medical registrar and after resident assistant physician. After a senior demyship at Magdalen College, Oxford, he took MRCP in 1906, a Radcliffe Travelling Fellowship in 1909 (to study at Wassermann Laboratory, Berlin), D.M. in 1912 and FRCP in 1913.

From 1910 he was assistant bacteriologist at the Lister Institute, London before to become in 1912 Professor of Pathology and Bacteriology at the University of Sheffield. Then he was Professor of Pathology first in the University of Manchester from 1915, where he was also a Major (R.A.M.C.) during the war, then in the University of Cambridge in August 1922, where he was also deputy professor of physic substituting Prof. John Ryle during the second world war.

In Cambridge, in the then small Department of Pathology in Downing Street, early Dean was able to let include in 1925 Pathology as a subject for Part II of the Natural Science Tripos. That was a successful choice, even for the history of pathology: many students who had taken the Part II Pathology course would go on to occupy important positions in pathology and other branches of medicine (among them was Max Barrett). Dean was engaged to design a new building of the Department of Pathology in Tennis Court Road, where it is today from September 1928. In 1946 he improved his course (58 lectures) with a training scheme for the would-be pathologists (2 or 3 years of experience of laboratory work). Apart his own works, he guided others to their subsequent experimental works, as well as to their publications on immunology.

From 1929 to 1954 he was Master of Trinity Hall, Cambridge (he was a Fellow there since he came to Cambridge in 1922) and from 1937 to 1939 Vice-Chancellor of the University of Cambridge. He was also Chairman of the Imperial Cancer Research Fund (1941–1956), member of the Medical Research Council (MRC), founder of the East Anglian Pathologists Club, and, from 1920 to 1954, secretary of the Pathological Society. Working for various universities he became: honorary Legum Doctor (LL.D) at University of Aberdeen and at Western Reserve University, honorary Doctor of Science (D.Sc) at University of Liverpool, and Honorary Fellow of New College, University of Oxford (from 1953). During the second world war he organized several blood transfusion donor services, while the department also accommodated the Galton Laboratory blood-grouping unit and the MRC Emergency Public Health Laboratory. After the war the Department of Pathology rose again, more closely bound to medicine.

To my mind pathology and medicine form one whole, and it is as difficult to think of pathology without medicine as I trust it is impossible to think of medicine without pathology.

Prof. H. R. Dean speech at the Edinburgh Pathological Club, 1918

== Personal life ==
Henry Dean married Irene Wilson, their son Sir Patrick Henry Dean, the United Kingdom Ambassador to the United States.
Their daughter Elizabeth Mary Dean (1910–2000) married The Ven. John Richardson (Archdeacon of Derby)

== Works ==
List of works in MLA format taken from the results of the search engines in the websites Wiley Online Library (for the works on The Journal of Pathology and Bacteriology) and National Center for Biotechnology Information (for all the other works).

- Dean, HR (1901). "The isometric value of active muscle excited directly and indirectly". The Journal of Physiology. 27 (3): 257–68. doi:10.1113/jphysiol.1901.sp000870. PMC 1540478. PMID 16992586.
- Dean, H. R. (1908). "Observations on the leucocytosis produced by the toxin of the diphtheria bacillus, with especial reference to the changes which follow the injection of antitoxin". The Journal of Pathology and Bacteriology. 12 (2): 154–165. doi:10.1002/path.1700120203.
- Dean, HR (1910). "An Examination of the Blood Serum of Idiots by the Wassermann Reaction". Proceedings of the Royal Society of Medicine. 3 (Neurol Sect): 117–23. doi:10.1177/003591571000300833. PMC 1960861. PMID 19974501.
- Dean, HR (1911). "Studies in Complement Fixation with Strains of Typhoid, Paratyphoid, and Allied Organisms". Proceedings of the Royal Society of Medicine. 4 (Pathol Sect): 251–78. doi:10.1177/003591571100401118. PMC 2005008. PMID 19975404.
- Dean, HR (1912). "A Discussion on Syphilis, with special reference to (a) its Prevalence and Intensity in the Past and at the Present Day; (b) its Relation to Public Health, including Congenital Syphilis; (c) the Treatment of the Disease". Proceedings of the Royal Society of Medicine. 5 (Gen Rep): 151–62. doi:10.1177/003591571200500518. PMC 2007148. PMID 19975865.
- Dean, HR (1912). "Ulcerative Endocarditis produced by the Pneumococcus in a Child, aged 3". Proceedings of the Royal Society of Medicine. 5 (Pathol Sect): 185–6. PMC 2004977. PMID 19976282.
- Dean, HR (1912). "The Relation between the Fixation of Complement and the Formation of a Precipitate". Proceedings of the Royal Society of Medicine. 5 (Pathol Sect): 62–103. PMC 2004976. PMID 19976292.
- Ledingham, JC; Dean, HR (1912). "The Action of the Complement-Fractions on a Tropin-B. Typhosus System with Comparative Haemolytic Experiments". The Journal of Hygiene. 12 (2): 152–94. doi:10.1017/S0022172400017113. PMC 2167385. PMID 20474490.
- Dean, HR (1912). "On the Mechanism of Complement Fixation". The Journal of Hygiene. 12 (3): 259–89. doi:10.1017/S0022172400005027. PMC 2167398. PMID 20474495.
- Dean, HR; Mouat, TB (1916). "The Bacteria of Gangrenous Wounds". British Medical Journal. 1 (2872): 77–83. doi:10.1136/bmj.1.2872.77. PMC 2346865. PMID 20767973.
- Dean, HR; Adamson, RS (1916). "Preliminary Note ON a METHOD FOR THE PREPARATION OF a NON-TOXIC DYSENTERY VACCINE". British Medical Journal. 1 (2887): 611–4. doi:10.1136/bmj.1.2887.611. PMC 2347429. PMID 20768111.
- Dean, HR (1916). "The Horace Dobell Lecture ON THE MECHANISM OF THE SERUM REACTION: Delivered before the Royal College of Physicians of London". British Medical Journal. 2 (2918): 749–52. doi:10.1136/bmj.2.2918.749. PMC 2355053. PMID 20768380.
- Dean, H. R. (1918). "The influence of temperature on the fixation of complement". The Journal of Pathology and Bacteriology. 21 (2): 193–214. doi:10.1002/path.1700210204.
- Ritchie, James; Boycott, A. E.; Dean, H. R. (1922). "German Sims Woodhead. K.B.E., M.D., LL.D. Born April 29th, 1855-Died December 29th, 1921". The Journal of Pathology and Bacteriology. 25: 118–137. doi:10.1002/path.1700250114.
- Dean, H. R. (1922). "The histology of a case of anaphylactic shock occurring in a man". The Journal of Pathology and Bacteriology. 25 (3): 305–315. doi:10.1002/path.1700250305.
- Dean, H. R. (1922). "A lumbar puncture needle for bacteriological work". The Journal of Pathology and Bacteriology. 25 (3): 398. doi:10.1002/path.1700250312.
- Dean, H. R.; Webb, R. A. (1924). "The morbid anatomy and histology of anaphylaxis in the dog". The Journal of Pathology and Bacteriology. 27: 51–64. doi:10.1002/path.1700270106.
- Dean, H. R.; Webb, R. A. (1924). "The blood changes in anaphylactic shock in the dog". The Journal of Pathology and Bacteriology. 27: 65–78. doi:10.1002/path.1700270107.
- Dean, H. R.; Webb, R. A. (1926). "The influence of optimal proportions of antigen and antibody in the serum precipitation reaction". The Journal of Pathology and Bacteriology. 29 (4): 473–492. doi:10.1002/path.1700290412.
- Dean, H. R. (1927). "Complement fixation in mixtures of toxin and antitoxin". The Journal of Pathology and Bacteriology. 30 (4): 675–685. doi:10.1002/path.1700300415.
- Dean, H. R.; Webb, R. A. (1928). "The determination of the rate of antibody (precipitin) production in rabbit's blood by the method of "optimal proportions"". The Journal of Pathology and Bacteriology. 31: 89–99. doi:10.1002/path.1700310108.
- Dean, HR (1930). "Educational Number, Session 1930-31: A Review of the Medical Curriculum". British Medical Journal. 2 (3635): 341–5. doi:10.1136/bmj.2.3635.341. PMC 2450311. PMID 20775678.
- Dean, H. R. (1932). "L.C.C. Pathological Service". British Medical Journal. 1 (3723): 909–10. doi:10.1136/bmj.1.3723.909. PMC 2520887.
- Dean, HR; Taylor, GL; Adair, ME (1935). "The Precipitation Reaction: Experiments with an Antiserum containing Two Antibodies". The Journal of Hygiene. 35 (1): 69–74. doi:10.1017/S0022172400018982. PMC 2170611. PMID 20475263.
- Dean, HR; Williamson, R; Taylor, GL (1936). "Passive Anaphylaxis following the immediate injection of Antigen after Antiserum". The Journal of Hygiene. 36 (4): 570–87. doi:10.1017/S002217240004393X. PMC 2171025. PMID 20475355.
- Dean, H. R. (1937). "The reaction of isamine blue with serum". The Journal of Pathology and Bacteriology. 45 (3): 745–771. doi:10.1002/path.1700450321.
- Balfour of Burleigh; Boycott, A. E.; Cummins, S. Lyle; Dawson, S. L.; Dean, H. R.; Dible, J. Henry; Duguid, J. B.; Eason, Herbert L.; et al. (1937). "Memorial to Professor E. H. Kettle". British Medical Journal. 1 (3986): 1134. doi:10.1136/bmj.1.3986.1134. PMC 2088913.
- Dean, H. R.; Wilson, G. S. (1944). "William Whiteman Carlton Copley. Born 19th January 1886. Died 21st January 1944". The Journal of Pathology and Bacteriology. 56 (3): 451–469. doi:10.1002/path.1700560324.
- Dean, H. R. (1946). "George Lees Taylor, Born 26th June 1897. Died 9th March 1945". The Journal of Pathology and Bacteriology. 58 (3): 593–597. doi:10.1002/path.1700580338.
- Dean, HR (1946). "The Pathological Society of London". Proceedings of the Royal Society of Medicine. 39 (12): 823–7. doi:10.1177/003591574603901218. PMC 2182434. PMID 19993415.

Academic offices
Preceded by Henry Bond	Master of Trinity Hall, Cambridge; 1929–1954	Succeeded by Sir William Ivor Jennings
Preceded by Godfrey Harold Alfred Wilson	Vice-Chancellor of the University of Cambridge; 1937–1939	Succeeded by Ernest Alfred Benians
