= Katherine Kedzierska =

Australian scientist

Professor Katherine Kedzierska FAA FAHMS
- Education: Monash University (PhD)
- Known for: Immunity to viral infections
- Awards: 2026 GSK Award for Research Excellence; 2023 Eureka Prize; 2018 Woodward Medal; 2016 Selwyn Smith Prize; 2016 Jacques Miller Medal
- Scientific career
- Fields: Immunology
- Workplaces: University of Melbourne; Peter Doherty Institute for Infection and Immunity

Katherine (Katarzyna) Kedzierska FAA FAHMS is a Polish born internationally recognised Australian immunologist, Professor of Immunology and Deputy Head of Department of Microbiology and Immunology at the University of Melbourne. Kedzierska is a Laboratory Head at the Peter Doherty Institute for Infection and Immunity (Melbourne, Australia) and also holds the position of Adjunct Professor at Hokkaido University (Sapporo, Japan).

== Early life and education ==
Kedzierska completed her undergraduate Bachelor of Science degree in 1994 and Bachelor of Science (Hons) in 1995 at Monash University. She received her PhD from Monash University in 2002, studying the mechanisms underlying defective phagocytosis by human monocytes and macrophages following HIV-infection under the supervision of Professor Suzanne Crowe at the Burnet Institute. This research earned her a 2001 Premier's Commendation for Medical Research and the 2002 Monash University Mollie Holman Doctoral Medal. Kedzierska undertook postdoctoral training with Nobel Laureate Professor Peter Doherty at the University of Melbourne defining features that underpin long-lasting protective immunity to influenza viruses.

== Career, research and accomplishments ==
In 2007 Kedzierska established her laboratory in the Department of Microbiology and Immunology, University of Melbourne. She was appointed Associate Professor in 2012 and full Professor in 2015. Since 2020 Kedzierska has also been Deputy Head of the Department of Microbiology and Immunology at the University of Melbourne. Kedzierska is recognised for her significant contributions to the field of immunity to pandemic, seasonal and newly emerged respiratory viruses, including influenza viruses and SARS-CoV-2. Her work (see Selected Publications) has described immune networks underpinning the severity of viral disease and recovery from viral infections in the young, the elderly and high risk populations such as pregnant women and Australian First Nations people. She was at the forefront of SARS-CoV-2 research, leading a research group that was the first in the world to publish on immunity to SARS-CoV-2 in one of Australia's first COVID-19 patients. Her research was recognised by the 2023 Eureka Prize for Infectious Disease Research. Kedzierska has also been awarded the 2026 GSK Award for Research Excellence and was listed as a Highly Cited Researcher in 2023 and 2024.

== Scientific outreach ==
Kedzierska serves on the Editorial Boards of PLoS Biology, Vaccine, Immunology & Cell Biology and Clinical & Translational Immunology.

== Awards, honours and recognition ==
- 2026 - University of Melbourne Redmond Barry Distinguished Professor
- 2026 - GSK Award for Research Excellence
- 2026 - Elected Fellow of the Australian Academy of Science
- 2023 - Australian Museum Eureka Prize for Infectious Diseases
- 2020 - 100 Most Influential Women in 2020, Forbes Women (Poland)
- 2019 - University of Melbourne Dame Kate Campbell Fellow
- 2019 - Elected Fellow of the Australian Academy of Health and Medical Sciences
- 2018 - Woodward Medal in Science and Technology
- 2016 - The Selwyn Smith Medical Research Prize
- 2016 - Australian Academy of Science Jacques Miller Medal for Experimental Biomedicine
- 2011 - Scopus Young Researcher of the Year Award for Medicine and Medical Sciences
- 2011 - National Health and Medical Research Council Excellence Award
- 2001 - Premier's Commendation for Medical Research

== Selected publications ==
- Jia, X; Crawford, JC; Gebregzabher, D; Monson, EA; Mettelman, RC; Wan, Y; Ren, Y; Chou, J; Novak, T; McQuilten, HA; Clarke, M; Bachem, A; Foo, IJ; Fritzlar, S; Carrera Montoya, J; Trenerry, AM; Nie, S; Leeming, MG; Nguyen, THO; Kedzierski, L; Littler, DR; Kueh, A; Cardamone, T; Wong, CY; Hensen, L; Cabug, A; Laguna, JG; Agrawal, M; Flerlage, T; Boyd, DF; Van de Velde, LA; Habel, JR; Loh, L; Koay, HF; van de Sandt, CE; Konstantinov, IE; Berzins, SP; Flanagan, KL; Wakim, LM; Herold, MJ; Green, AM; Smallwood, HS; Rossjohn, J; Thwaites, RS; Chiu, C; Scott, NE; Mackenzie, JM; Bedoui, S; Reading, PC; Londrigan, SL; Helbig, KJ; Randolph, AG; Thomas, PG; Xu, J; Wang, Z; Chua, BY; Kedzierska, K (22 August 2024). "High expression of oleoyl-ACP hydrolase underpins life-threatening respiratory viral diseases". Cell. 187 (17): 4586–4604.e20. doi:10.1016/j.cell.2024.07.026. ISSN 1097-4172. PMID 39137778.
- Loh, L; Saunders, PM; Faoro, C; Font-Porterias, N; Nemat-Gorgani, N; Harrison, GF; Sadeeq, S; Hensen, L; Wong, SC; Widjaja, J; Clemens, EB; Zhu, S; Kichula, KM; Tao, S; Zhu, F; Montero-Martin, G; Fernandez-Vina, M; Guethlein, LA; Vivian, JP; Davies, J; Mentzer, AJ; Oppenheimer, SJ; Pomat, W; Ioannidis, AG; Barberena-Jonas, C; Oceanian Genome Variation Project, Consortium; Moreno-Estrada, A; Miller, A; Parham, P; Rossjohn, J; Tong, SYC; Kedzierska, Katherine; Brooks, AG; Norman, PJ (27 November 2024). "An archaic HLA class I receptor allele diversifies natural killer cell-driven immunity in First Nations peoples of Oceania". Cell. 187 (24): 7008–7024.e19. doi:10.1016/j.cell.2024.10.005. ISSN 1097-4172. PMC 11606752. PMID 39476840.
- Thevarajan, Irani; Nguyen, Thi H. O.; Koutsakos, Marios; Druce, Julian; Caly, Leon; van de Sandt, Carolien E.; Jia, Xiaoxiao; Nicholson, Suellen; Catton, Mike; Cowie, Benjamin; Tong, Steven Y. C.; Lewin, Sharon R.; Kedzierska, Katherine (April 2020). "Breadth of concomitant immune responses prior to patient recovery: a case report of non-severe COVID-19". Nature Medicine. 26 (4): 453–455. doi:10.1038/s41591-020-0819-2. ISSN 1546-170X. PMC 7095036. PMID 32284614.
- Koutsakos, Marios; Illing, Patricia T.; Nguyen, Thi H. O.; Mifsud, Nicole A.; Crawford, Jeremy Chase; Rizzetto, Simone; Eltahla, Auda A.; Clemens, E. Bridie; Sant, Sneha; Chua, Brendon Y.; Wong, Chinn Yi; Allen, E. Kaitlynn; Teng, Don; Dash, Pradyot; Boyd, David F.; Grzelak, Ludivine; Zeng, Weiguang; Hurt, Aeron C.; Barr, Ian; Rockman, Steve; Jackson, David C.; Kotsimbos, Tom C.; Cheng, Allen C.; Richards, Michael; Westall, Glen P.; Loudovaris, Thomas; Mannering, Stuart I.; Elliott, Michael; Tangye, Stuart G.; Wakim, Linda M.; Rossjohn, Jamie; Vijaykrishna, Dhanasekaran; Luciani, Fabio; Thomas, Paul G.; Gras, Stephanie; Purcell, Anthony W.; Kedzierska, Katherine (May 2019). "Human CD8+ T cell cross-reactivity across influenza A, B and C viruses". Nature Immunology. 20 (5): 613–625. doi:10.1038/s41590-019-0320-6. ISSN 1529-2916. PMID 30778243.
- Zhang, W; Kedzierski, L; Chua, BY; Mayo, M; Lonzi, C; Rigas, V; Middleton, BF; McQuilten, HA; Rowntree, LC; Allen, LF; Purcell, RA; Tan, HX; Petersen, J; Chaurasia, P; Mordant, F; Pogorelyy, MV; Minervina, AA; Crawford, JC; Perkins, GB; Zhang, E; Gras, S; Clemens, EB; Juno, JA; Audsley, J; Khoury, DS; Holmes, NE; Thevarajan, I; Subbarao, K; Krammer, F; Cheng, AC; Davenport, MP; Grubor-Bauk, B; Coates, PT; Christensen, B; Thomas, PG; Wheatley, AK; Kent, SJ; Rossjohn, J; Chung, AW; Boffa, J; Miller, A; Lynar, S; Nelson, J; Nguyen, THO; Davies, J; Kedzierska, Katherine (June 2023). "Robust and prototypical immune responses toward COVID-19 vaccine in First Nations peoples are impacted by comorbidities". Nature Immunology. 24 (6): 966–978. doi:10.1038/s41590-023-01508-y. ISSN 1529-2916. PMC 10232372. PMID 37248417.
- van de Sandt, Carolien E.; Nguyen, Thi H. O.; Gherardin, Nicholas A.; Crawford, Jeremy Chase; Samir, Jerome; Minervina, Anastasia A.; Pogorelyy, Mikhail V.; Rizzetto, Simone; Szeto, Christopher; Kaur, Jasveen; Ranson, Nicole; Sonda, Sabrina; Harper, Alice; Redmond, Samuel J.; McQuilten, Hayley A.; Menon, Tejas; Sant, Sneha; Jia, Xiaoxiao; Pedrina, Kate; Karapanagiotidis, Theo; Cain, Natalie; Nicholson, Suellen; Chen, Zhenjun; Lim, Ratana; Clemens, E. Bridie; Eltahla, Auda; La Gruta, Nicole L.; Crowe, Jane; Lappas, Martha; Rossjohn, Jamie; Godfrey, Dale I.; Thomas, Paul G.; Gras, Stephanie; Flanagan, Katie L.; Luciani, Fabio; Kedzierska, Katherine (November 2023). "Newborn and child-like molecular signatures in older adults stem from TCR shifts across human lifespan". Nature Immunology. 24 (11): 1890–1907. doi:10.1038/s41590-023-01633-8. ISSN 1529-2916. PMC 10602853. PMID 37749325.
- Nguyen, Thi H. O.; Rowntree, Louise C.; Petersen, Jan; Chua, Brendon Y.; Hensen, Luca; Kedzierski, Lukasz; van de Sandt, Carolien E.; Chaurasia, Priyanka; Tan, Hyon-Xhi; Habel, Jennifer R.; Zhang, Wuji; Allen, Lilith F.; Earnest, Linda; Mak, Kai Yan; Juno, Jennifer A.; Wragg, Kathleen; Mordant, Francesca L.; Amanat, Fatima; Krammer, Florian; Mifsud, Nicole A.; Doolan, Denise L.; Flanagan, Katie L.; Sonda, Sabrina; Kaur, Jasveen; Wakim, Linda M.; Westall, Glen P.; James, Fiona; Mouhtouris, Effie; Gordon, Claire L.; Holmes, Natasha E.; Smibert, Olivia C.; Trubiano, Jason A.; Cheng, Allen C.; Harcourt, Peter; Clifton, Patrick; Crawford, Jeremy Chase; Thomas, Paul G.; Wheatley, Adam K.; Kent, Stephen J.; Rossjohn, Jamie; Torresi, Joseph; Kedzierska, Katherine (11 May 2021). "CD8+ T cells specific for an immunodominant SARS-CoV-2 nucleocapsid epitope display high naive precursor frequency and TCR promiscuity". Immunity. 54 (5): 1066–1082.e5. doi:10.1016/j.immuni.2021.04.009. ISSN 1097-4180. PMC 8049468. PMID 33951417.
- Rowntree, Louise C.; Nguyen, Thi H. O.; Kedzierski, Lukasz; Neeland, Melanie R.; Petersen, Jan; Crawford, Jeremy Chase; Allen, Lilith F.; Clemens, E. Bridie; Chua, Brendon; McQuilten, Hayley A.; Minervina, Anastasia A.; Pogorelyy, Mikhail V.; Chaurasia, Priyanka; Tan, Hyon-Xhi; Wheatley, Adam K.; Jia, Xiaoxiao; Amanat, Fatima; Krammer, Florian; Allen, E. Kaitlynn; Sonda, Sabrina; Flanagan, Katie L.; Jumarang, Jaycee; Pannaraj, Pia S.; Licciardi, Paul V.; Kent, Stephen J.; Bond, Katherine A.; Williamson, Deborah A.; Rossjohn, Jamie; Thomas, Paul G.; Tosif, Shidan; Crawford, Nigel W.; van de Sandt, Carolien E.; Kedzierska, Katherine (12 July 2022). "SARS-CoV-2-specific T cell memory with common TCRαβ motifs is established in unvaccinated children who seroconvert after infection". Immunity. 55 (7): 1299–1315.e4. doi:10.1016/j.immuni.2022.06.003. ISSN 1097-4180. PMC 9174177. PMID 35750048.
- Koutsakos, Marios; Wheatley, Adam K.; Loh, Liyen; Clemens, E. Bridie; Sant, Sneha; Nüssing, Simone; Fox, Annette; Chung, Amy W.; Laurie, Karen L.; Hurt, Aeron C.; Rockman, Steve; Lappas, Martha; Loudovaris, Thomas; Mannering, Stuart I.; Westall, Glen P.; Elliot, Michael; Tangye, Stuart G.; Wakim, Linda M.; Kent, Stephen J.; Nguyen, Thi H. O.; Kedzierska, Katherine (14 February 2018). "Circulating TFH cells, serological memory, and tissue compartmentalization shape human influenza-specific B cell immunity". Science Translational Medicine. 10 (428) eaan8405. doi:10.1126/scitranslmed.aan8405. hdl:11343/221875. ISSN 1946-6242. PMID 29444980.
- Wang, Zhongfang; Wan, Yanmin; Qiu, Chenli; Quiñones-Parra, Sergio; Zhu, Zhaoqin; Loh, Liyen; Tian, Di; Ren, Yanqin; Hu, Yunwen; Zhang, Xiaoyan; Thomas, Paul G.; Inouye, Michael; Doherty, Peter C.; Kedzierska, Katherine; Xu, Jianqing (13 May 2015). "Recovery from severe H7N9 disease is associated with diverse response mechanisms dominated by CD8⁺ T cells". Nature Communications. 6 6833. doi:10.1038/ncomms7833. ISSN 2041-1723. PMC 4479016. PMID 25967273.
