= Henry MacCormac =

Henry MacCormac is the name of:

- Henry MacCormac (physician) (1800–1886), British physician in Belfast
- Henry MacCormac (dermatologist) (1879–1950), his grandson, dermatologist
