= Patrick Dean (diplomat) =

British ambassador (1909–1994)

Sir Patrick Dean GCMG
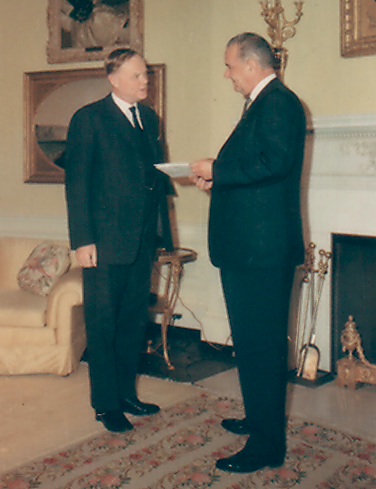
- Born: Patrick Henry Dean; 16 March 1909; Berlin, Germany
- Died: 5 November 1994 (aged 85); Kingston, Surrey
- Education: Rugby School, Gonville and Caius College, Cambridge, Lincoln's Inn
- Occupations: Barrister, Ambassador
- Spouse: Patricia Wallace Jackson

Sir Patrick Henry Dean GCMG (16 March 1909 – 5 November 1994) was Permanent Representative of the United Kingdom to the United Nations from 1960 to 1964 and British Ambassador to the United States from 1965 to 1969. He was also a chairman of the Joint Intelligence Committee.

== Early life and background ==
Patrick Henry Dean was born in Berlin, Germany, to Henry Roy Dean, (1879–1961), a professor of Pathology at the University of Cambridge, and his wife, Irene Wilson (1875–1959), the daughter of Charles Arthur Wilson. Henry Roy Dean was a member of the MacCormac family and was the maternal grandson of Dr Henry MacCormac and the nephew of Sir William MacCormac.

After education at Cambridge, he was called to the Bar by Lincoln's Inn, and he attempted to secure a career at the Bar in London, but was unsuccessful, and as a result he joined the Civil Service. He became a legal adviser to the Foreign office. In that capacity, Dean served as a legal adviser at the Yalta Conference in February 1945, dealing with the repatriation of Soviet citizens after World War II, and at the Potsdam Conference, in July and August 1945. He also served as an adviser during the postwar Nuremberg trials of German war criminals and to the British Control Commission in occupied Germany.

As British ambassador to Washington, Dean was occupied with difficulties over Vietnam and British military commitments East of Suez. He helped to promote greater mutual understanding between the two governments, but faced a president who had a negative attitude to foreign diplomats.

Diplomatic posts
Preceded by Lord Harlech	British Ambassador to the United States; 1965–1969	Succeeded by John Freeman
