= John MacCormac =

Irish timber merchant

John MacCormac (24 March 1791, Lurgan – 20 March 1865) was an Irish timber merchant who pioneered the timber trade in the Colony of Sierra Leone. John MacCormac was also the founder of the first Free Will Baptist church in Sierra Leone and served as a member of His Majesty's Colonial Council and was styled with the title of 'Honorable'. MacCormac was the grandfather and namesake of Dr John Farrell Easmon, the Chief Medical Officer of the Gold Coast Colony who coined the term 'Blackwater Fever' and wrote the first English-based clinical diagnosis of Blackwater fever.

== Background ==
John MacCormac was born on 24 March 1791 in Lurgan, County Armagh in Northern Ireland to John MacCormac, a wealthy linen merchant and Ann MacCormac, née Hall, a daughter of Colonel or General Joseph Hall Jr., a wealthy distiller and proprietor of Hall Place, in Lurgan, Northern Ireland. MacCormac was the paternal grandson of Cornelius MacCormac, a high-ranking British naval officer who died in England during the process of trying to recover his gold-laced hat.

John MacCormac was born to the MacCormac family of County, Armagh and was the elder brother of Henry MacCormac, a lecturer at Queen's University, Belfast. MacCormac was the paternal uncle of Sir William MacCormac, a lecturer at St Thomas Hospital and a senior physician to King Edward VII of the United Kingdom.

== Business ==
MacCormac first arrived in West Africa by the age of eighteen and originally settled in the Gold Coast. MacCormac settled permanently in Sierra Leone in 1814 and by 1816 he introduced the timber trade to Sierra Leone by shipping a type of timber called African Teak, which was really African Oak, from the estuary of the Rokel River to England. He built himself a home and a timber yard on Timbo Island. He contracted a workforce of Temne labourers as well as Black colonists from the Sierra Leone some of whom also acted as overseers of the timber production process. He also built a large stone house in the Sierra Leone hinterland and a spacious mansion worth £10,000 on the corner of Rawdon and Oxford Streets.

MacCormac was financially ruined by the late 1830s and he retired to Liverpool, England alongside his brother and business partner, Hamilton Edmund MacCormac. MacCormac returned to Sierra Leone after declaring bankruptcy but was allowed to keep his commodious mansion by his creditors. He subsequently undertook a number of government appointments.

== Political career and colonial appointments ==
MacCormac was one of the wealthiest merchants in Sierra Leone and he was appointed by His Majesty's Colonial Council of Sierra Leone in the 1820s. MacCormac was a contemporary of Honorable Kenneth Macaulay, a Scottish merchant and colonial official in Sierra Leone, who served on the Colonial Council of Sierra Leone. MacCormac also served on the Colonial Council alongside Benjamin Campbell, a British merchant of Scottish descent who served as the first Consul-General to the Lagos Colony. MacCormac and Campbell entered into a treaty with the Koya Temne on behalf of Governor Alexander Findlay the representative of the Crown colonial government.

MacCormac served in various positions of responsibility within the colonial government and civil service. MacCormac served as a Justice of Peace and was subsequently appointed as an Assistant Police Magistrate for the Colony of Sierra Leone. MacCormac was eventually appointed as the Police Magistrate of the Colony of Sierra Leone in the mid-nineteenth century. MacCormac's former extensive business interests with the Koya Temne allowed the colonial council to appoint MacCormac as an unofficial envoy or ambassador for the Colony of Sierra Leone and the neighbouring indigenous ethnic groups. MacCormac undertook trade missions and engaged treaties on behalf of the colonial government of Sierra Leone. MacCormac was eager for the Temne to reject Islam and accept Christianity and some historians have stated that this bias is reflected in MacCormac's decisions as a representative of the Crown Colonial Government of Sierra Leone.

== Ministry ==
After suffering financial ruin, MacCormac became a pious convert to Christianity and became a Free Will Baptist. MacCormac was the founder and first pastor of Church of God, Regent Road, which was initially located at MacCormac's mansion at the corner of Rawdon and Oxford Streets. MacCormac left an endowment for the church in his will and the church was subsequently established at Regent Road, Freetown and has an active congregation in Freetown, Sierra Leone. MacCormac was succeeded as the first pastor of the Church of God by his adopted son or ward, Thomas George Lawson, a Popo prince who served in the senior civil service of Sierra Leone.

== Parliamentary testimony ==
John MacCormac was one of several European residents called to testify before the British Parliament in 1830 regarding the governance of Sierra Leone and the effectiveness of maintaining the Colony. MacCormac attributed his longevity to eating the local diet of rice, fish, and other African-based foods.

== Death ==
After suffering from a bout of illness, John MacCormac left Sierra Leone permanently on 21 June 1864 and settled in Barnsbury in Islington, London. He died in Barsnbury on 20 March 1865 and his obituary was recorded in the Law Magazine and Law Review and the Solicitors' Journal & Reporter. MacCormac was one of the oldest and longest European residents of Sierra Leone and he lived in West Africa for over fifty years. He left a fortune of £4,000 to his grandchildren and other benefactors. MacCormac's grandson and namesake, John Farrell Easmon, received a £400 inheritance at the age of eighteen or nineteen years old and used the inheritance from his grandfather's estate to fund his medical studies.

== Descendants ==
John MacCormac possibly had a relationship with Hannah Cuthbert, a daughter of African American immigrants from Savannah, Georgia to Freetown and had at least one daughter, Catherine MacCormac, who regularly visited her uncle, Dr Henry MacCormac in Belfast, Northern Ireland. John MacCormac was the maternal grandfather of Dr John Farrell Easmon and the paternal great-grandfather of Dr McCormack Easmon. Charles Odamtten Easmon, a Ghanaian surgical consultant, was a great-great-grandson of John MacCormac.
