= MacCormac family of County Armagh, Northern Ireland =

MacCormac
- Current region: Northern Ireland, United Kingdom
- Origin: County Armagh, Northern Ireland
- Members: Sir William MacCormac, Sir Patrick Dean, Sir Richard MacCormac
- Connected families: Almond, Burden, Burrowes, Dean, Easmon,
- Distinctions: Medicine, architecture, civil service, commerce

The MacCormac family is a family of Northern Irish ancestry that originates in County Armagh, Northern Ireland. The MacCormac family produced four medical doctors and at least three members of the family received knighthoods during the nineteenth and early twentieth centuries. The family is of Ulster ancestry and perhaps also has some distant English ancestry through Colonel Joseph Hall of Hall Place, Lurgan.

== History ==
The MacCormac family descends from the union of John MacCormac, (d. 1811), a prosperous linen merchant and Mary Ann Hall, (1766-1846), a wealthy heiress and daughter of Colonel Joseph Hall, a notable distiller in County Armagh. John MacCormac was the son of Cornelius MacCormac, a high-ranking naval officer who died after falling aboard a vessel.

The precise origins of the MacCormac family of County Armagh are unclear and it does not appear as though the family was of Scottish descent. The family may have descended from the family of Archbishop Cornelius MacCormac of Armagh, who was a clergyman in late seventeenth century Ireland. The origins of the Hall family are probably in England or Scotland, although the name may be an anglicised version of a traditionally Irish surname.

== Medicine ==
The medical strand in the MacCormac family began with Henry MacCormac, (1800-1886), the son of John MacCormac and Mary Ann MacCormac. Henry MacCormac qualified as a medical doctor in Dublin, Paris, and earned a Medical Doctorate from the University of Edinburgh in 1824. It is primarily from Henry MacCormac's lineage that the notable MacCormac dynasty descend, although his elder brother, Hon. John MacCormac was the progenitor of the Easmon medical family, a West African medical dynasty. Dr Henry MacCormac married Mary Newsam, the daughter of William Newsam, a linen merchant, descended from an old English family that settled in Ireland in 1640.

Henry MacCormac and Mary Newsam MacCormac were the parents of Sir William MacCormac, 1st Baronet, the most decorated surgeon of the late nineteenth century, who served as Serjeant-Surgeon to King Edward VII. The grandson and namesake of Dr Henry MacCormac, was a dermatologist and the father of architect, Sir Richard MacCormac.

== Notable members ==
The descendants of Henry MacCormac and Mary Newsam MacCormac include several medical doctors and other descendants who distinguished themselves in education, commerce, and the civil service during the nineteenth and early twentieth centuries. At least three members of the MacCormac family were knighted during the nineteenth and twentieth centuries, and at two others members of the family were decorated with civil honours.

Members of the MacCormac family include:

- Henry MacCormac (physician), notable physician and man of letters
- John MacCormac, pioneer of the African timber trade in Sierra Leone
- Sir William MacCormac, Five-times President of the Royal College of Surgeons of England and Serjeant-Surgeon to King Edward VII
- Henry MacCormac (dermatologist), CBE, (1879-1950), dermatologist and Lieutenant-Colonel in the Royal Army Medical Corps
- Dr Henry Roy Dean, medical doctor and professor of Pathology at the University of Cambridge and Master of Trinity Hall, Cambridge
- Sir Patrick Dean, (1909-1985), British ambassador to the United States
- Sir Richard MacCormac, architect and founder of MacCormac, Pritchard, and James

== Descendants of the MacCormac family in West Africa ==
The Easmon family of Sierra Leone descends from John MacCormac, (1794-1865), a prosperous timber merchant who was the elder brother of Dr Henry MacCormac, the nineteenth century physician. John MacCormac arrived in West Africa in 1816. He lived in the Gold Coast and Sierra Leone for over fifty years. MacCormac and his brother, Hamilton Edmund MacCormac, Esq., exported timber from Sierra Leone to Britain and established a prosperous business in the early nineteenth century.

Members of the Easmon family, a West African medical dynasty that partially descends from John MacCormac, (1794-1865), include:

- John Farrell Easmon, coined the term Blackwater Fever and wrote the first clinical analysis of the disease
- Macormack Charles Farrell Easmon, OBE, notable physician and historian of Sierra Leone
- Charles Odamtten Easmon, first Ghanaian to qualify as a Fellow of the Royal College of Surgeons of Edinburgh
- Charles Syrett Farrell Easmon, CBE, distinguished microbiologist and medical administrator

== Sources ==
- Fraser, Ian (Winter 1968). "Father and son - a tale of two cities". Ulster Medical Journal. 37 (1): 1–39.
- Fraser, Ian (1983). "Sir Willam MacCormac and his times - Thomas Vicary Lecture". Annals of the Royal College of Surgeons of England. 65 (5): 339–346. PMC 2494387. PMID 6351706.
- Marshall, Robert (1948). The Open Window', A Paper read to the British Tuberculosis Association at its Annual Meeting in Belfast. Graham & Heslip. pp. 188–199.
- Froggatt, Peter. "Henry MacCormac (1800 - 1886): Physician". The Dictionary Of Ulster Biography.
- Magee, Karl (2004). "Maccormac, Henry (1800–1886)". Oxford Dictionary of National Biography (online ed.). Oxford University Press. doi:10.1093/ref:odnb/1739. (Subscription, Wikipedia Library access or UK public library membership required.)
- Brown, G.H. "Henry MacCormac, b.1879 d.12 Dec 1950CBE MD Edin FRCP (1917)'". Munks Roll. Royal College of Physicians. Archived from the original on 15 April 2016.
