= Henry MacCormac (dermatologist) =

British dermatologist (1879–1950)

- Born: Henry MacCormac; 30 June 1879; Belfast
- Died: 12 December 1950 (aged 71); Marylebone
- Education: Royal Armagh School, University of Edinburgh
- Occupations: Physician and Dermatologist
- Spouse: Marion Broomhall
- Children: Sir Richard MacCormac
- Writing career
- Language: English

Henry MacCormac, CBE (1879-1950), was a British dermatologist during the early twentieth century. MacCormac was a member of a distinguished medical family that included Henry MacCormac and Sir William MacCormac. Henry MacCormac also served as a captain in the Royal Army Medical Corps during the First World War.

== Early life and background ==
Henry MacCormac was born in 1879 in Belfast, Ireland to John MacCormac and Lucie MacCormac, née Purdon. Henry MacCormac was the named for his paternal grandfather, Dr Henry MacCormac, a physician in Belfast during the early to late nineteenth century.

== Education ==
Henry MacCormac was educated at the University of Edinburgh and graduated MB.ChB. in 1903. He qualified as a member of the Royal College of Physicians of England shortly thereafter.

== Career ==
Henry MacCormac served as a dermatologist in the department of dermatology at Middlesex Hospital. MacCormac, nicknamed 'Harry Mac', was very popular among his students and patients and he was highly respected by his professional colleagues and peers. In 1945, MacCormac delivered the Lumleian Lectures at the Royal College of Physicians.

== Service in the First World War ==
MacCormac served as a captain in the Royal Army Medical Corps during the First World War and he was stationed at Queen Alexandra Military Hospital. He was later promoted to lieutenant-colonel in the R.A.M.C. during the war.

== Family ==
In 1931, Henry MacCormac married Marion Broomhall, (1906-1998), and the couple had one son, Richard MacCormac, a well-known architect and Fellow of the Royal Society of Arts. Marion Broomhall was the granddaughter of Benjamin Broomhall and the great-niece of James Hudson Taylor, a notable missionary in China. Broomhall was also the sister of Alfred James Broomhall, a missionary who served with the China Inland Mission.

== Later life ==
Henry MacCormac died in Marylebone, London on 12 December 1950 at the age of 71. He was survived by his wife, Marion MacCormac, and his son, Richard MacCormac, who founded MJP Architects and was later knighted in 2001.

== Sources ==
- Fraser, Ian, ‘Father and son--a tale of two cities’, Ulster Medical Journal, 1968 Winter Vol. 37 No. 1), pp. 1–39
- Fraser, Sir Ian, ‘Sir Willam MacCormac and his times’, Thomas Vicary Lecture, Annals of the Royal College of Surgeons of England (1983) Vol. 65, pp. 339–346
- Marshall, M.D., F.R.C.P. LOND., F.R.C.P.I., D.P.H., Robert, 'The Open Window', A Paper read to the British Tuberculosis Association at its Annual Meeting in Belfast, in June, 1948, pp. 188–199
