= Richard MacCormac =

Modernist architect (1938–2014)

Sir Richard MacCormac CBE PPRIBA RA FRSA
- Born: Richard Cornelius MacCormac; 3 September 1938; Marylebone, London, England
- Died: 26 July 2014 (aged 75); Spitalfields, London, England
- Education: Trinity College, Cambridge; Bartlett School of Architecture, University College London
- Occupation: Architect/university lecturer
- Years active: 1967–2014
- Notable work: Ruskin Library, Southwark tube station
- Spouse: Susan Karin Landen (m. 1964; sep. 1983)
- Partner: Jocasta Innes (1983–2013; her death)
- Children: 2

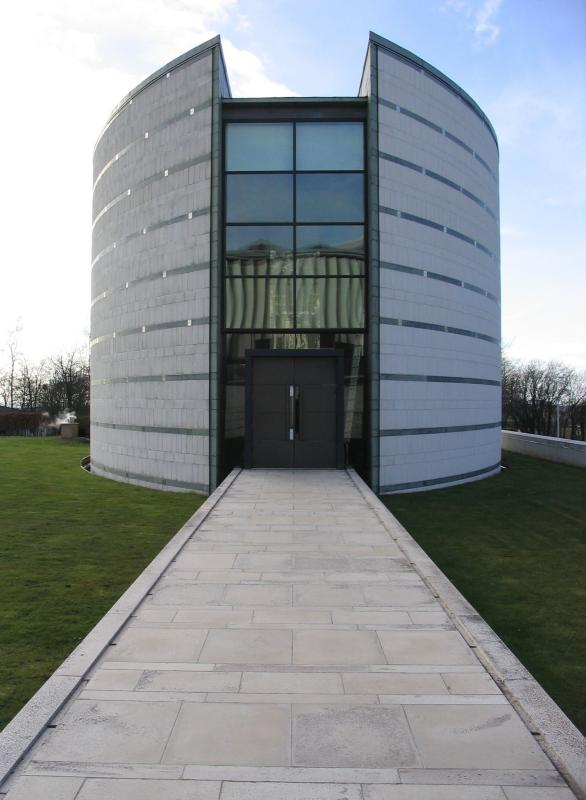
The Ruskin - Library, Museum and Research Centre at the University of Lancaster

Sir Richard Cornelius MacCormac CBE, PPRIBA, FRSA, RA (3 September 1938 – 26 July 2014), was a modernist English architect and the founder of MJP Architects.

== Early life and background ==
Richard Cornelius MacCormac was born in Marylebone, London on 3 September 1938, the son of Dr. Henry MacCormac (1879 – 12 December 1950), CBE FRCP, a dermatologist of Ulster origin, and Marion Maude MacCormac (1906–1998; née Broomhall).

Through his paternal lineage, MacCormac was the great-grandson of Dr. Henry MacCormac, a prominent nineteenth-century physician in Northern Ireland who was the father of Sir William MacCormac, 1st Bt, KCB, KCVO, who served as a house physician and surgeon to Queen Victoria and honorary sergeant-surgeon to King Edward VII. The family was a well-known medical dynasty in the nineteenth century that originated from County Armagh and claims descent from Cornelius MacCormac, a high-ranking naval officer, and Colonel Joseph Hall, a wealthy distiller in County Armagh. Distant relatives also include a branch of the Easmon family of Sierra Leone, descended from Dr. John Farrell Easmon, the discoverer of Blackwater fever.

== Education and early career ==
MacCormac was educated at Westminster School. After serving his national service in the Royal Navy, he attended Trinity College, Cambridge, where he studied parts I and II of the Architecture and Fine Arts tripos, before proceeding to the Bartlett School of Architecture, University College London.

MacCormac undertook a broad range of work, including social housing for the London Borough of Merton, before founding MacCormac Jamieson and Prichard in 1972. In 2011, he left MJP to set up a new practice in his own name.

After winning an open competition for the design of the University of Bristol Arts Faculty building, he made his name in the 1980s through the use of modernist design, particularly in university architecture. These included: the Sainsbury Building for Worcester College, Oxford (won the 1984 Civic Trust Award); The Ruskin - Library, Museum and Research Centre at the University of Lancaster (Independent on Sunday Building of the Year Award 1996, Royal Fine Art Commission/BSkyB Building of the Year University Winner 1998, Millennium Products status awarded by the Design Council 1999); Bowra Building at Wadham College, Oxford; Burrell's Fields at Trinity College, Cambridge (RIBA Regional Award 1997, Civic Trust Award 1997) and the Garden Quadrangle at St John's College, Oxford.

== Notable projects ==
MacCormac's commercial clients included: Southwark tube station for the Jubilee Line Extension (Royal Fine Art Commission Trust/BSkyB Millennium Building of the Year Award 2000); the Wellcome Foundation Wing/Dana Centre at the Science Museum, London (Celebrating Construction Achievement Regnl Award for Greater London 2000); the Cable and Wireless training centre in Coventry (Royal Fine Art Commission/Sunday Times Building of the Year Award 1994) and a Tesco supermarket in Ludlow.

MacCormac designed the new Egton Wing of the BBC's Broadcasting House. But more than halfway through the project, the BBC asked for a redesign in light of its budget restrictions, and MacCormac refused, unwilling to sacrifice the quality of his design, and hence MJP was sacked from the project. In 1999, MacCormac designed a new home in Hampstead for Arsenal F.C. striker Thierry Henry, described as "one of the finest examples of modern architecture in the UK".

MacCormac was a co-founder of the Phoenix Initiative, working on merging art and architecture for the future concept of central Coventry. The project was shortlisted for the RIBA Stirling Prize in 2004.

== Academic career and honors ==
MacCormac taught architecture at the University of Cambridge (1969–75; 1979–81), and was a visiting professor of architecture at the University of Edinburgh from 1982 to 1985, the University of Hull (1998–99) and a studio tutor at the London School of Economics in 1998.

Elected as a fellow of the Royal Society of Arts in 1982, he was elected to the Royal Academy in 1993. He was made an honorary fellow of Trinity College, Cambridge, in 2006, and was awarded an honorary Doctor of Science (D.Sc.) in 2008. He made a CBE in 1994, and was knighted in 2001.

His hobbies included music and reading, and he owned and sailed a 1908 oyster fishing smack in the Thames Estuary.

== Personal life ==
MacCormac married Susan Karin Landen in Surrey in 1964 and had two children, William Paul Lars MacCormac (born 1969) and Luke Henry Landen MacCormac (5 October 1971 – 30 June 1982), who died at age 10.

In 1981, MacCormac met his long-term partner, Jocasta Innes, a well-known author who wrote over 60 books. The couple resided in Spitalfields. With Jocasta Innes' death on 20 April 2013 and fighting his own cancer battle, her house was put up for sale.

In June 2014, Sir Richard published Two Houses in Spitalfields. Photographed by the interiors photographer Jan Baldwin and with a foreword by the historian Dan Cruickshank, it is a personal description of the joined houses just off Brick Lane that he and Jocasta Innes shared for thirty years. Proceeds from the book are being donated to the Maggie's centres cancer charity.

== Death ==
MacCormac died on 26 July 2014 at the age of 75 from cancer. He was buried next to Jocasta Innes in St. Mary’s' churchyard in the village of Laverton in Somerset.

== Gallery ==
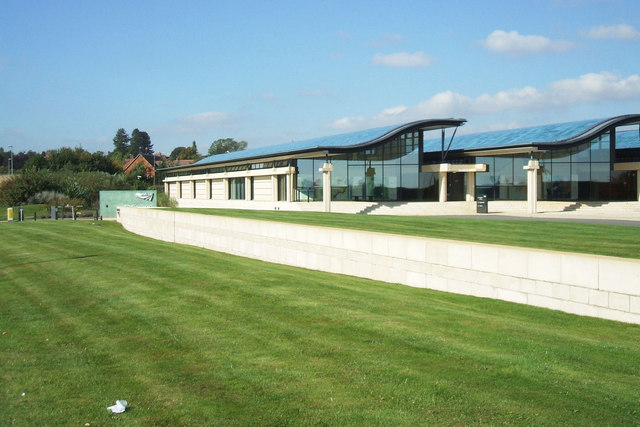
The former Cable and Wireless training centre in Coventry, now owned by Network Rail

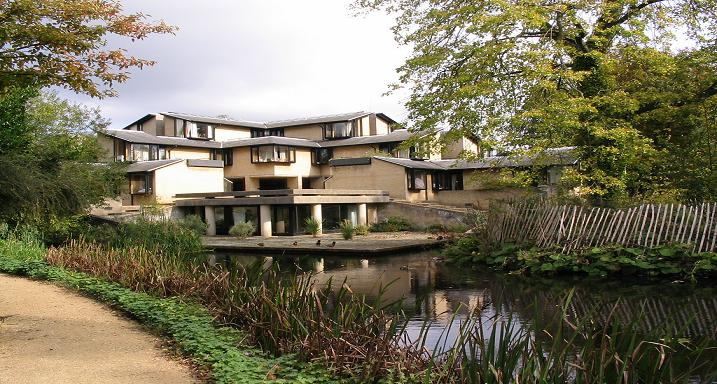
Sainsbury Building for Worcester College, Oxford

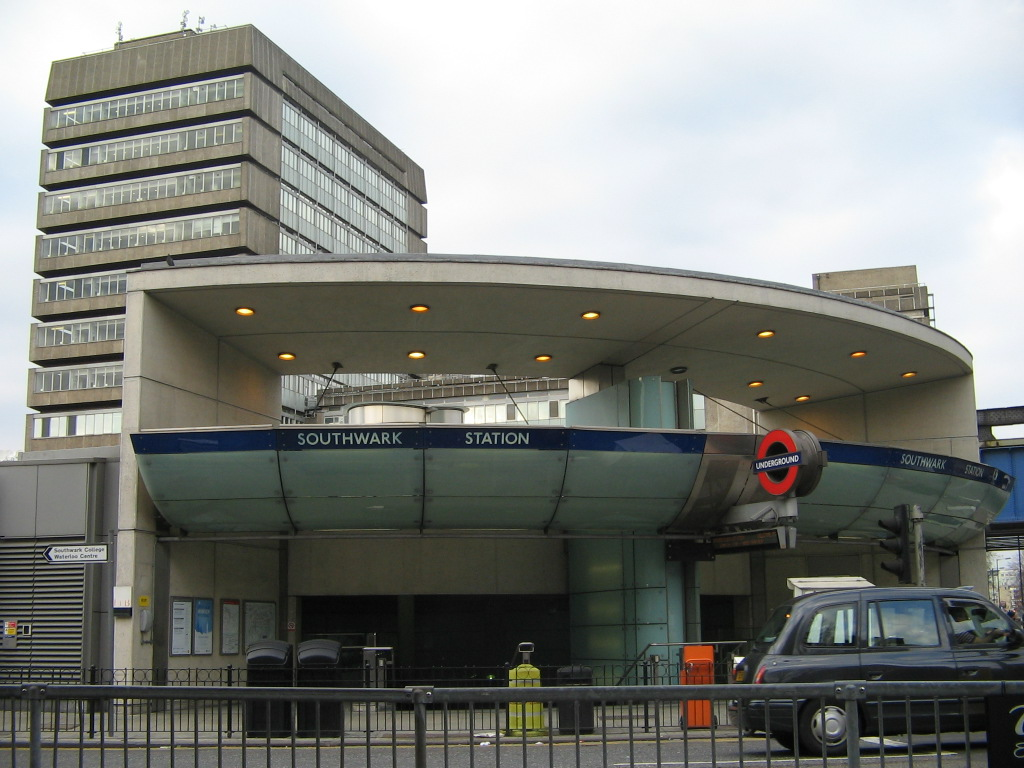
Entrance to Southwark tube station

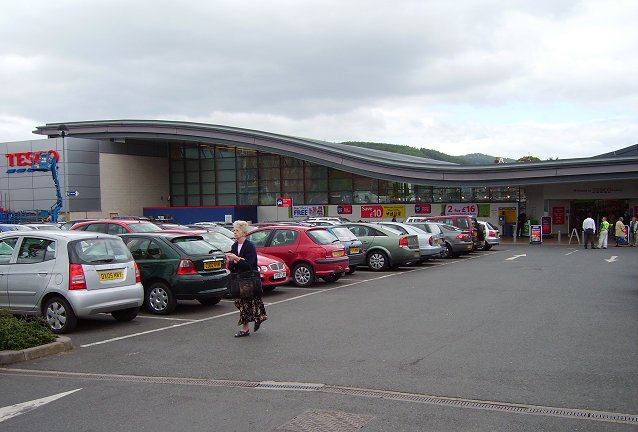
Tesco at Ludlow

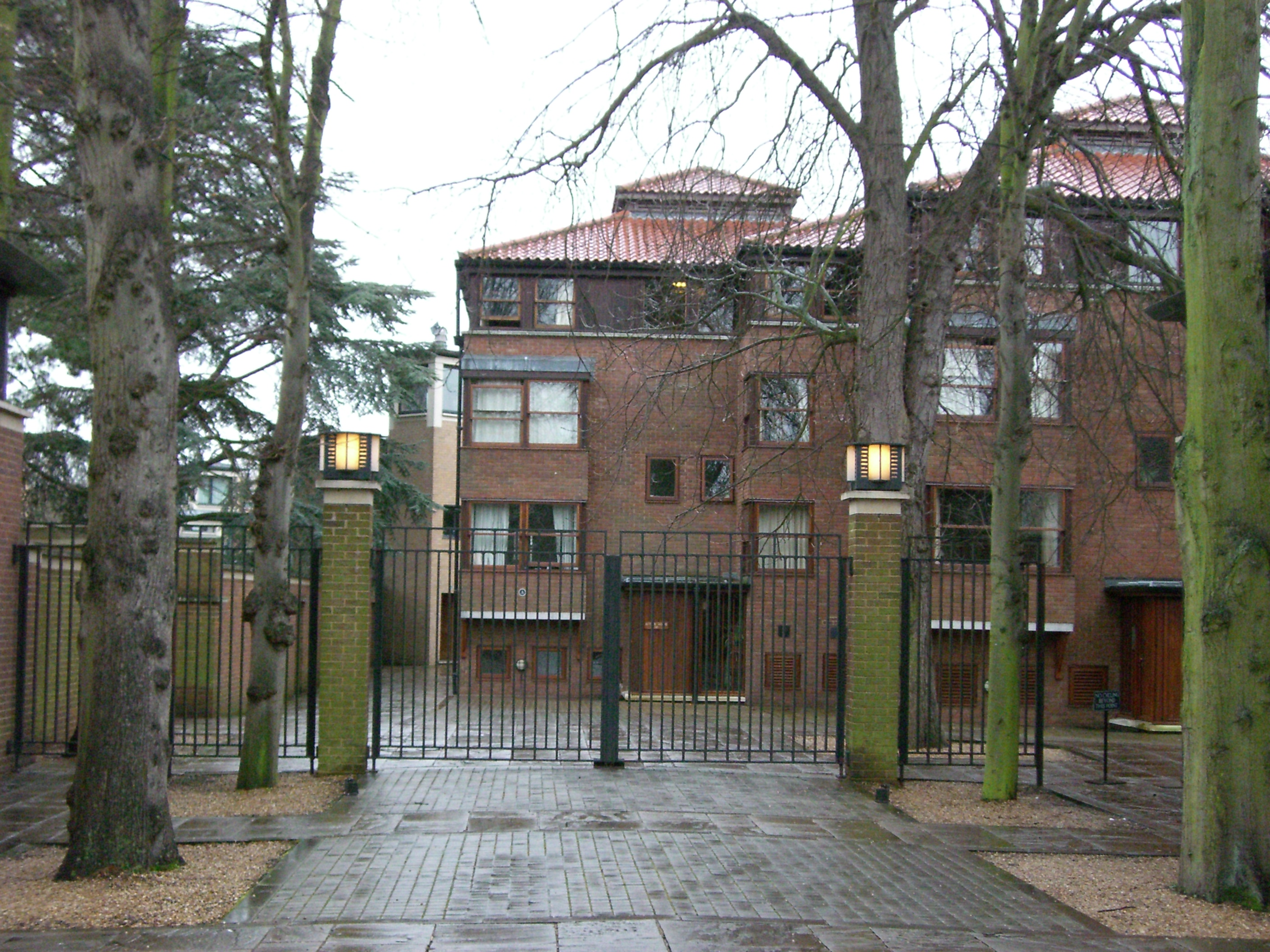
Burrell's Field for Trinity College, Cambridge

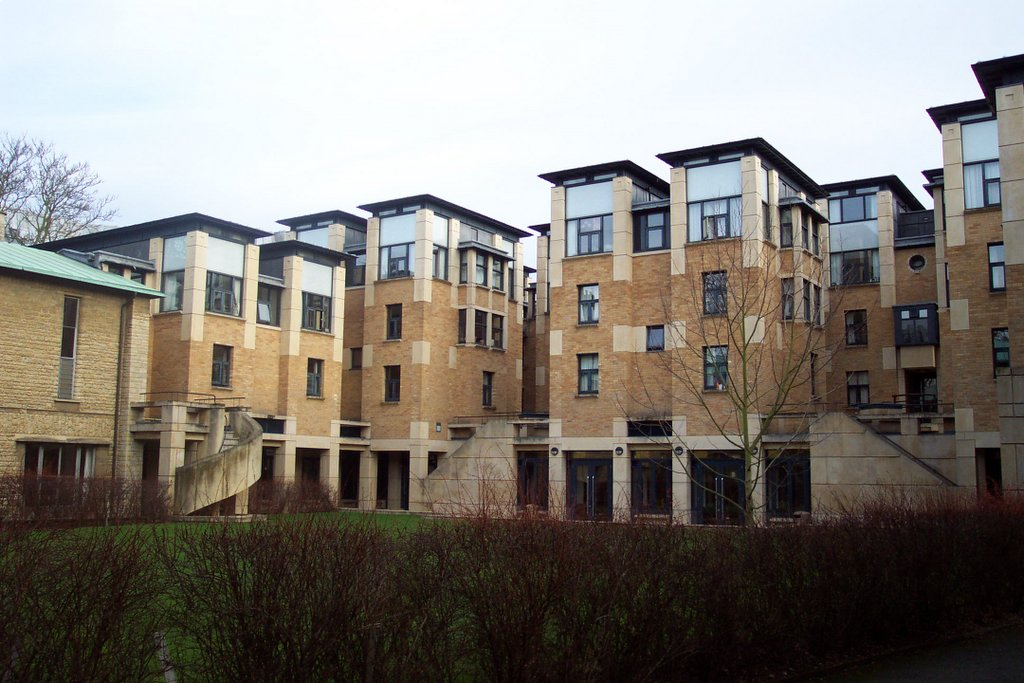
Bowra Building at Wadham College, Oxford

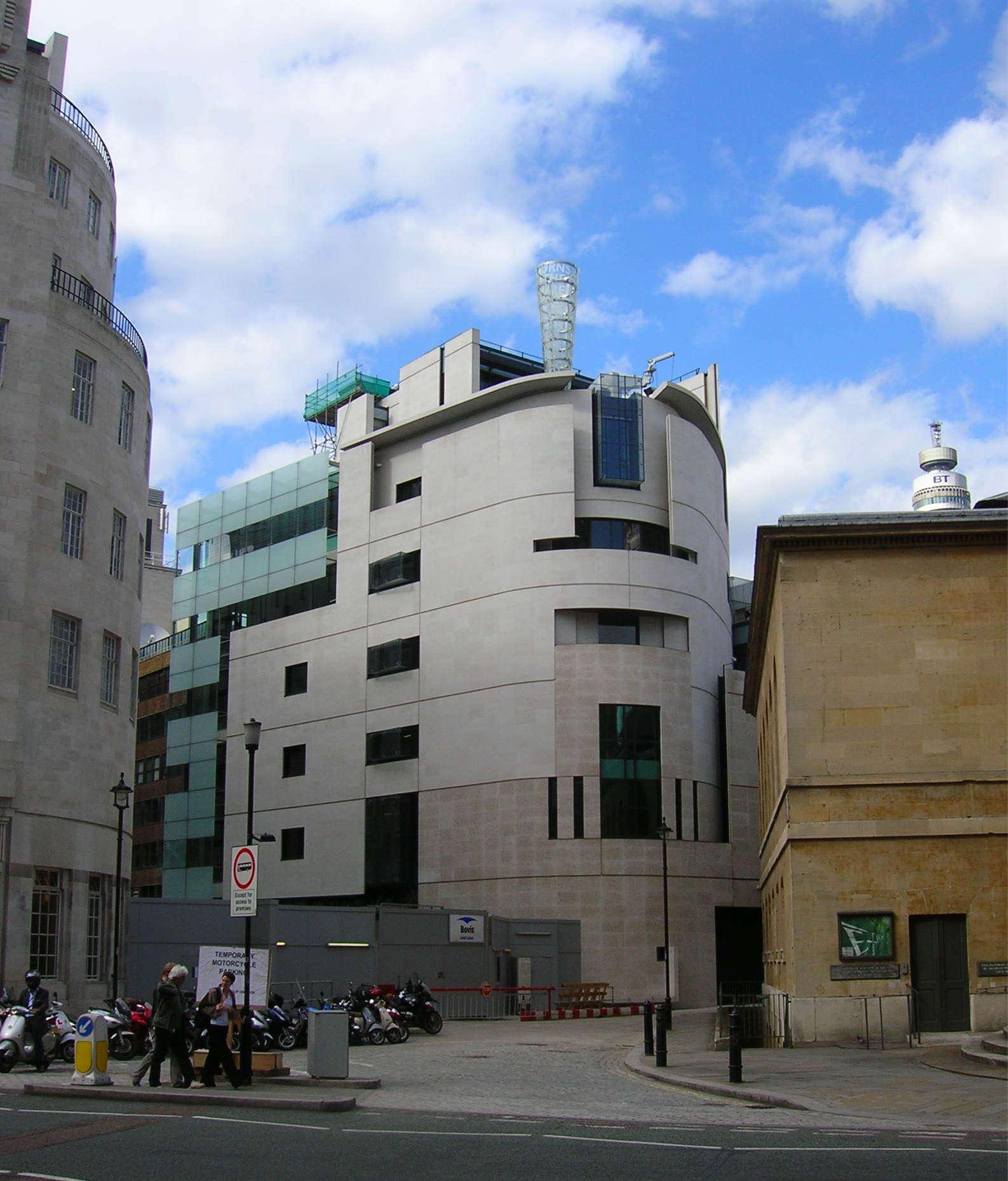
The Egton Wing of the BBC's Broadcasting House

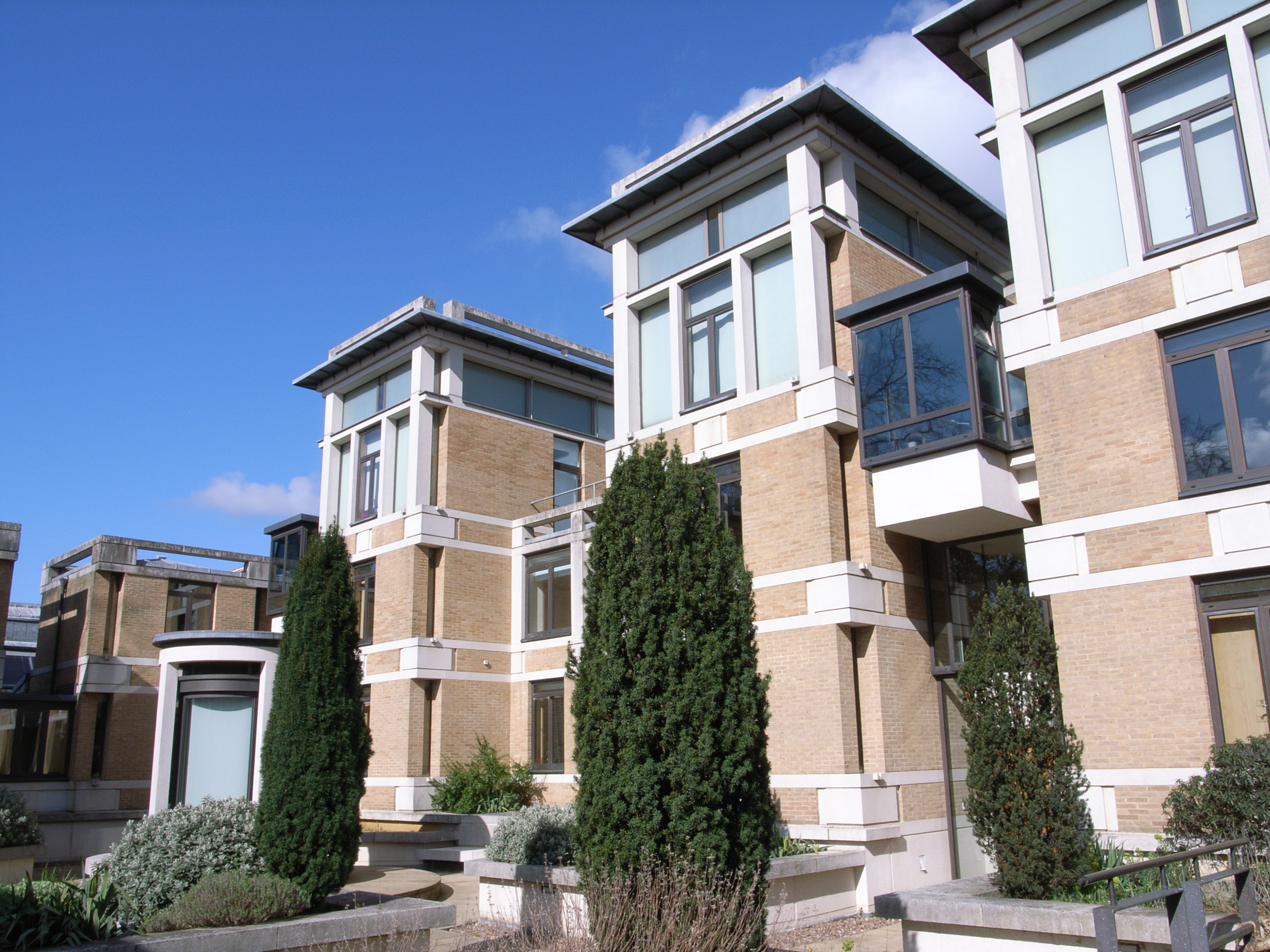
The Garden Quadrangle, St John's College, Oxford
