= Clinical & Translational Immunology =

- Discipline: Immunology
- Language: English
- Edited by: Professor Rajiv Khanna

Publication details
- Publisher: John Wiley & Sons, Inc (Australia)
- Frequency: Monthly
- Open access: Yes
- Impact factor: 6.515 (2021)

Standard abbreviations
- ISO 4: Clin. Transl. Immunol.

Indexing
- ISSN: 2050-0068

Links
- Journal homepage; CTI Special Features

Clinical & Translational Immunology (CTI). is an international academic journal of the Australian and New Zealand Society for Immunology (ASI).

In 2012, CTI was founded in direct response to a growing need for publishing clinically-orientated research papers in the field of immunology, including the latest advances in SARS-CoV-2 / COVID-19. In 2018, CTI received its inaugural Impact Factor of 7.271 and is currently undergoing a rapid phase of significant growth, holding a ranking of 42/162 in the category of Immunology journals, according to 2020 Journal Citation Reports (Clarivate Analytics).

The journal's Editor-in-Chief is Professor Rajiv Khanna. Current Deputy Editors are Professor Tobias Bald, Professor Gabrielle Belz, Professor Michaela Lucas, Assoc. Professor Seth Masters, Assoc. Professor Paul Neeson, Professor Lisa Ng, Associate Professor Belinda Parker, and Professor Di Yu.

CTI has a sister journal, Immunology & Cell Biology (ICB).

Both ASI journals, Clinical & Translational Immunology and Immunology & Cell Biology, offer prestigious awards to authors such as Publication of the Year Awards and Social Impact Awards. Each year, the ASI Annual Scientific Meeting hosts a dedicated workshop session to recognise the authors of top papers published in CTI and ICB.
