= Department of Pathology, University of Cambridge =

- Purpose: Research and teaching in Pathology
- Head of Department: Professor Heike Laman
- Parent organization: University of Cambridge
- Website: www.path.cam.ac.uk

The Department of Pathology is a department of the University of Cambridge that conducts research and teaching in Pathology.

Founded in 1883, the Department of Pathology is one of the largest departments within the School of Biological Sciences, involved in scientific research and teaching related to pathology, the study of the causes and effects of disease to advance medicine and devise new treatments. The current head of Department is Professor Heike Laman.

== Buildings ==
The department spans three buildings. The main departmental building, finished in 1927 (architect Edward Warren) is situated on Tennis Court Road and the nearby Molteno Institute. Both are situated on the Downing Site in central Cambridge. The third location is part of the main hospital building at Addenbrooke's Hospital on the Cambridge Biomedical Campus.

== Research ==
As of 2025, the department has 162 researchers, including 110 post-graduate researchers, 50 postdoctoral researchers and 49 research groups. Research spans four divisions including cellular and molecular pathology, immunology, microbiology and parasitology and virology.

== Teaching ==
The department is heavily involved in teaching across the medical and veterinary sciences as well as the natural sciences. Over 450 undergraduate students are trained each year in the 2nd year Biology of Disease course, taught to a cohort of medical, veterinary and natural sciences students in their second year. Further third year teaching takes the form of the Part II Pathology course which again features a mixed cohort of approximately 90 students. Finally, specific clinical teaching is also provided in collaboration with the clinical school.

== Professor of Pathology and Head of Department Chronology ==
The Professor of Pathology is an established (statutory) chair at the University of Cambridge which was established in 1883. Traditionally, the Professor of Pathology also served as formal Head of Department. Following a change to the University’s Statutes and Ordinances decoupling the two roles, Professor Heike Laman was elected 10th Head of Department in 2022, becoming the first woman to ever hold this role since the department’s founding in 1883, and Professor Adrian Liston was appointed subsequently as the Professor of Pathology in 2023. Professor Laman was re-elected as Head of Department in 2025.

- 1883-1897 Charles Roy - Professor of Pathology & Head of Department
- 1897-1898 Alfredo Kanthack - Professor of Pathology & Head of Department
- 1899-1922 German Sims Woodhead - Professor of Pathology & Head of Department
- 1922-1961 Henry Roy Dean - Professor of Pathology & Head of Department
- 1962-1975 Ronald Greaves - Professor of Pathology & Head of Department
- 1975-1987 Peter Wildy - Professor of Pathology & Head of Department
- 1987-1998 Malcolm Ferguson-Smith - Professor of Pathology & Head of Department
- 1998-2011 Andrew Wyllie - Professor of Pathology & Head of Department
- 2011-2022 Geoffrey Smith - Professor of Pathology & Head of Department
- 2022- Heike Laman - Head of Department (re-elected in 2025)
- 2023- Adrian Liston - Professor of Pathology

== Emeritus and notable alumni ==
Notable alumni of the department include:

- Henry Roy Dean - Professor of Pathology and responsible for significant pathology teaching at Cambridge and the current building on Tennis Court Road in 1928. With Ronald Greaves, developed reliable methods for freeze-drying plasma, the process now known as lyophilisation.
- Andrew Wyllie - Discovered apoptosis, the first process of programmed cell death to be described. He defined the breakdown of DNA during apoptosis and its role in tumour growth
- Malcolm Ferguson-Smith - Distinguished medical geneticist from Glasgow, held the chair from 1987 to 1998. He emphasised the importance of Pathology in the analysis of the genome and so positioned the department well for the 21st Century.
- Geoffrey L. Smith - Virologist and medical research authority in the area of Vaccinia virus and the family of Poxviruses. Part of the UK's response to the 2022 Mpox epidemic.
- Ashley Moffett - Moffett has been at the forefront of research into the immunology of trophoblast invasion and its role in placentation for over 25 years. She became a fellow of the Royal College of Obstetricians and Gynaecologists in 2015, and a fellow of the Academy of Medical Sciences in 2019.
