= Thomas George Lawson =

Thomas George Lawson was born in October 1814 in New London in Little Popo, which is Togo. He is the second son of George Acquatey Lawson. His mother was a member of the royal family in Awana. He was sent to England at 11 years old for education. He was entrusted to an English merchant and then placed under the care of John McCormack. McCormack was Thomas’s patron, and he wanted Thomas to receive a good education in the colonial school system. When Thomas finished school, he was employed as an agent and interpreter in McCormack’s timber company. McCormack used Lawson as his interpreter and personal representative on his missions for the colony administration. This started his long career as an interpreter.

== Family ==
In one of his visits to Koya, which is located in Erbil. He met Sarian, who was a granddaughter of the Nem Ghana of the kingdom, which is a city in Accra, Ghana. Thomas George and Sarian had five children. The eldest was William Thomas George Lawson, who was born around 1840. He later followed his father’s footsteps and was appointed to the colonial service.

Thomas’s second son was Moses Thomas George Lawson. He was born in the late 1850s. He became a pastor of the church of God, a small American Baptist church. In May 1886, Moses Lawson married Miss Luretica, a daughter of the Reverend J. During the Niger mission.3 Thomas George Lawson’s youngest child was Catherine Sarah Ann. She was educated at Annie Walsh Memorial School. On July 6, 1887, she married Nicholas J. Spain, the younger brother of the colony’s postmaster, J.H. Spain. This was a very influential wedding of two politically active Freetown families that attracted most of the elite colony. There were other children in Lawson’s family, but information about them is scarce. The second eldest son was named Thomas George, named after his father. He died in March 1897. Thomas also lost a daughter in October 1878. Thomas George Lawson and his family were members of the African elite in Sierra Leone. They played important roles in the social, administrative, and religious affairs of the colony.

== Career ==
Thomas worked for John McCormack as a personal interpreter until 1846. Thomas accompanied him on numerous trade and official government missions. Thomas excelled in his job so much so that his boss McCormack convinced Sierra Leone’s Governor MacDonald to hire him as the governor’s advisor and interpreter for meeting with African rulers. In 1846, Governor Macdonald began to use Thomas Lawson as his personal messenger to Port Loko’s rulers and to other African territories. Between 1846 and 1851, Lawson proved his value to the colonial administration, and in 1851, Governor Macdonald proposed to employ him as the first official government messenger and interpreter in the colonial secretary’s office at $100 per year 4 Appointed Government Interpreter in 1852, he acted as a liaison between the colonial government and the rulers of the surrounding countries. From 1854 until the end of 1860, he also served as an inspector of the police, and from January 1, 1861, he carried the title of government interpreter. After 1872, he was the head of a developing African bureau, and in 1878 he became the protector of government guest Lawson’s evaluation of the importance of Muslim communities for the development of British interests was in accordance with the ideas of the Colonial Office, Sierra Leone officials, and a few Europeans.

He helped people realize that long-distance and local trade networks could only be maintained with the help of Muslim caravan organizers, merchants, landlords, and religious authorities in the colony. He was highly regarded and trusted by both the Muslim communities and colonial governors. This allowed him to mediate disputes, to facilitate the growth of trade, and to expand British influence beyond the colony. Thomas was the head of the Native Affairs Department and was once sent by the British government to negotiate a peaceful conflict dealing with the "new Spartacus" but failed.6 Thomas George Lawson retired from colonial service in 1888. His ending salary was $350 per year. He received compensation for aiding African ambassadors in Freetown.

== Achievements ==
Thomas George Lawson was highly praised in his career and left his mark in several different aspects. In the forty-three years that he worked, from January 1846 to January 1889, Thomas wrote countless reports, letters, and memoranda. These tens of thousands of pages has provided scholars with valuable data about many aspects of political, social, and economic affairs in Guinea and Sierra Leone.

He had intimate familiarity with nearby small states, notably Koya, Port Loko, Kafu Bullom, Loko Masama, Marampa, and Masimera; but he also had dealings with merchants and leaders further north and in the Sherbro territory to the south. His connections with these states and their rulers helped him establish strong ties and made him and his family very influential people.

Thomas Lawson used his position as government interpreter to create a staff of assistants and Arabic letter writers that provided governors with intelligence about “native affairs” and helped to build British influence in what became the Protectorate of Sierra Leone. He and his able staff, some of whom were Muslim, produced thousands of pages of reports for consideration by colonial officials. He also created the colony’s Foreign Affairs Bureau, which dealt with important issues in diplomatic, economic, cultural, and military relations with interior states; and he met with African delegations and arranged for their accommodation in the colony. He collected a vast array of information about African societies in personal reports to the governors. These reports and letters to and from African notables were recorded in the Government Interpreter’s Letter Books, in the Arabic Letter Books, and in other documents now in the Sierra Leone National Archive.
