= Ashley Moffett =

British immunologist

Ashley Moffett CMG is a Professor in the Department of Pathology at the University of Cambridge specialising in Reproductive Immunology, and a fellow of King's College, Cambridge. She became a fellow of the Royal College of Obstetricians and Gynaecologists in 2015, a fellow of the Academy of Medical Sciences in 2019 and Fellow of the Royal Society in 2026.

== Career ==
Moffett has been at the forefront of research into the immunology of trophoblast invasion and its role in placentation for over 25 years. Her main areas of research currently are into interactions between maternal Killer-cell Immunoglobulin-like Receptor (KIR) and fetal HLA-C molecules, the culture of human trophoblast cells and the link between KIR/HLA-C variants to pre-eclampsia, puerperal sepsis and obstructed labour. She leads the maternal health scheme as part of the Wellcome Trust Centre for Global Health Research.

Her research has shown that women with pre-eclampsia have differences in genes involved in cell communication, to women without pre-eclampsia. These genes are involved in chemical signalling between placenta trophoblast cells and natural killer immune cells.

In 2018, Moffet was a lead researcher of a team that developed miniature versions of placentas outside the body. These artificial placenta organoids provide an additional tool for research into placental development and the effects of hormones, drugs, and infection such as Zika virus.

She has also led work in mapping characteristics of individual cells at the interface of the placenta and the uterus. This work revealed how these cells communicate and modulate the mother's immune response during the first trimester of pregnancy. Trophoblast cells of the placenta were found to be important in facilitating blood flow to the uterus.

Moffett has come out strongly against the use of immune-suppressive drugs as a means of preventing miscarriage, commenting, "That's a very attractive idea, but it's actually not correct. But it's become firmly embedded and it's extremely hard to dislodge it, even among scientists." Also, in relation to pregnancy, she has stated that pre-eclampsia, often experienced by African women, is impossible to predict or prevent. "Even when it is detected the only course of action is constant monitoring, and ultimately the only cure is delivery – sometimes at too early a stage for the baby to survive."

Alongside her research, Moffett has also been involved in public engagement work. In 2019 she gave a talk on fetal rejection at the Cambridge Science Festival.

== Awards and honours ==
- Best career in clinical research, IVI Foundation (2019)
- Fellow - Academy of Medical Sciences (2019)
- Fellow - Royal College of Obstetricians and Gynaecologists (2015)
- Awarded Karolinska Institutet honorary doctorate (2024)

== Selected works ==
- Moffett, Ashley; Loke, Charlie; McLaren, Anne (2006). Biology and Pathology of Trophoblast. Cambridge University Press. ISBN 978-1-139-45254-0.
- Loke, Y. W.; King, Ashley (1995). Human Implantation: Cell Biology and Immunology. Cambridge University Press. ISBN 978-0-521-44193-3.
