= Adrian Liston =

British immunologist (born 1980)

- Born: 1980 (age 45–46); Adelaide
- Education: University of Adelaide; Australian National University; University of Queensland
- Awards: FMedSci; FRSB; 2016 Eppendorf Prize; 2015–2016 Franqui Chair; Dr. Karel-Lodewijk Prize
- Scientific career
- Fields: Neuroimmunology; Diabetes; Immunology; Genetics; Clinical immunology
- Workplaces: University of Cambridge; Department of Pathology; St Catharine's College
- Doctoral advisor: Chris Goodnow

Adrian Liston is an Australian immunologist and Professor of Pathology at the University of Cambridge in Cambridge. He is also Professorial Fellow, Postgraduate Tutor and Director of Studies at St Catharine's College and Editor-in-Chief of Immunology & Cell Biology. He was previously senior group leader at the Babraham Institute, senior research fellow at Churchill College, professor at the KU Leuven (Leuven, Belgium) and head of the VIB Translational Immunology Laboratory.

Liston obtained a PhD at the Australian National University in 2005. He completed postdoctoral work at the University of Washington in Seattle, United States. Liston is an advocate for both animal rights and also the use of animals in medical research. Liston is the author of immunology-themed children's books, including Maya's Marvellous Medicine, Battle Robots of the Blood and Just for Kids! All about Coronavirus during the global COVID-19 pandemic. Liston authored Becoming a Scientist: The Graphic Novel to encourage students from diverse backgrounds to consider a career in STEM.

== Research ==
His main research interests are in the fields of neuroimmunology, autoimmunity, primary immune deficiencies and diabetes. Liston led the discovery of Pyrin-associated auto-inflammation with neutrophilic dermatosis, a previously unknown auto-inflammatory disease caused by mutation in the gene MEFV. Liston is also known for identifying genetic fragility of pancreatic beta cells as a cause of diabetes. In 2016, Liston led a team that found that cohabitation modified the immune system, making partners more similar to each other. His research team has emphasized the role of the environment over genes in shaping the immune system. In 2017, his team identified novel mutations in the gene STAT2 which lead to primary immunodeficiency. Liston also led a team that developed a machine learning algorithm that identifies children with juvenile arthritis with almost 90% accuracy from a simple blood test.

In the neuroimmunology field, Liston led a team that identified a role for white blood cells in the development of the brain. This work lead to further findings that the inflammatory environment of the brain could be controlled through a population of anti-inflammatory Regulatory T cells that reside within the brain. The system is the subject of a research spin-off company from the Babraham Institute, Aila Biotech Ltd, focused on clinical development of a therapeutic product for multiple sclerosis and traumatic brain injury.

== Awards and appointments ==
Liston has received numerous awards and appointments including:

- Dr. Karel-Lodewijk Prize (2015)
- Eppendorf Young European Investigator Award (for his work in elucidating key mechanisms by which the immune system avoids attacking the body while remaining effective against pathogens) (2016)
- Franqui Chair to lecture at the Université libre de Bruxelles (2015–2016)
- Churchill College Senior Research Fellowship (2020)
- Fellow of the Academy of Medical Sciences, elected (2021)
- Fellow of the Royal Society of Biology (2022)
- St Catharine's College Professorial Fellowship (2023)
