= Gabrielle Belz =

Australian immunologist

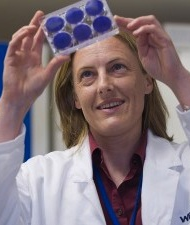
- Education: University of Queensland
- Awards: Burnet Prize; Gottschalk Medal; NHMRC Elizabeth Blackburn Fellowship; Australian Laureate Fellowship
- Scientific career
- Fields: Medicine; Immunology; Veterinary Science
- Workplaces: Walter and Eliza Hall Institute of Medical Research; Frazer Institute, University of Queensland
- Doctoral advisor: Professor Trevor Heath

Gabrielle T. Belz FAA FAHMS is an Australian molecular and viral immunologist whose research focuses on the cellular and molecular mechanisms regulating immune responses to infectious diseases. She is an Australian Research Council (ARC) Australian Laureate Fellow and Chair in Immunology at the Frazer Institute, The University of Queensland.

She was elected a Fellow of the Australian Academy of Science in 2025. Belz has made important contributions to the understanding of immune system function, especially in relation to the molecular and cellular signalling pathways of immune response to viruses. Her research has focused on understanding the signals that drive the initial development of protective immunity against pathogen infections, such as influenza and herpes viruses. This includes research into how cytotoxic T cells (a type of T lymphocyte that destroys virally infected cells and tumor cells) recognise and remove virally-infected cells from the body following infection. Research into the description of the specific factors and response during infection will contribute towards the long-term development of vaccines for infectious disease, and the development of better treatments for autoimmune diseases.

Her more recent work examines innate lymphoid cells and how innate and adaptive immune responses interact at mucosal surfaces. Her 2024 ARC Australian Laureate Fellowship supports research into the immune signalling networks that protect and repair epithelial barriers in the lungs and gastrointestinal tract, with potential relevance to vaccines and treatments for infection and inflammatory disease.

== Education ==
Belz trained as a veterinarian and completed her undergraduate studies at the University of Queensland, graduating with a Bachelor of Veterinary Biology in 1990, then a Bachelor of Veterinary Science with First Class Honours in 1993. She completed a PhD in 1997 at the University of Queensland. Following her PhD, she took up a Postdoctoral Fellowship in viral immunology with Nobel Laureate Professor Peter Doherty at St Jude Children's Research Hospital in Memphis, USA. She returned to Australia to take up a position with the Walter and Eliza Hall Institute of Medical Research in 2000. In 2010, she received a Doctor of Veterinary Science from the University of Queensland.

Belz was Editor-in-Chief of Immunology and Cell Biology until 2026, and was a Deputy Editor of the journal for several years. She is currently an Editorial Committee Member for Annual Reviews in Immunology.

== Awards ==
In 2007 Belz was awarded the Burnet Prize (recognising the Australian virologist Sir Macfarlane Burnet) for her research into how dendritic cells and cytotoxic T cells work together to defend the body from viral infections.

In 2008, Belz was awarded the Gottschalk Medal by the Australian Academy of Science for her contribution to a series of pioneering discoveries illuminating how the immune system deals with viruses. The same year, she was awarded with the Viertel Senior Medical Research Fellowship.

In 2012, Belz was awarded the NHMRC Elizabeth Blackburn Fellowships award (recognising the Australian-American biological researcher and Nobel Laureate, Professor Elizabeth Blackburn). In 2018 she was elected Fellow of the Australian Academy of Health and Medical Sciences. She received an Australian Laureate Fellowship in 2024.

In 2024, Belz was awarded the Australian Laureate Fellowship by the Australian Research Council, funding her research into the role of epithelial-immune interactions of the lungs and gut in triggering the body's immune responses.

== Selected publications ==
- Chaudhry MZ, Chen E, Man HO, Jones A, Denman R, Yu H, Huang Q, Ilich A, Schreuder J, Navarro S, Tuong ZK, Belz GT. GFI1-driven transcriptional and epigenetic programs maintain CD8^{+} T cell stemness and persistence. Nat Immunol. 2025 Jun;26(6):894-907. doi: 10.1038/s41590-025-02151-5. Epub 2025 May 15.PMID: 40374731
- Cao WHJ, You Y, Wang N, Chaudhry MZ, Yu H, Bell PT, Noye EC, Denman R, Lee B, Waddington A, Ye J, Schreuder J, Huang Q, Tellier J, Curio S, Santiago J, Amann-Zalcenstein D, Jacquelot N, Hickey P, Nutt SL, Seillet C, Hansbro PM, Wimmer VC, Strugnell RA, Tuong ZK, Ritchie ME, Belz GT. Peyer's patch M cells organize an epithelial niche that sustains group 3 innate lymphoid cells and IL-22. Nat Immunol. 2026 Sep;27(9):1829-1841. doi: 10.1038/s41590-026-02606-3. Epub 2026 Aug 14. PMID: 42601474
- Bell PT, Belz GT. Fibroblasts as regulators of lung immunity, repair and fibrosis. Nat Rev Immunol. 2026 Jun;26(6):455-471. doi: 10.1038/s41577-026-01268-4. Epub 2026 Feb 12. PMID: 41680464
- Huang Q, H J Cao W, Curio S, Yu H, Denman R, Chen E, Schreuder J, Dight J, Chaudhry M, Jacquelot N, Wimmer VC, Seillet C, Möröy T, Belz GT. GFI1B specifies developmental potential of innate lymphoid cell progenitors in the lungs. Sci Immunol. 2024 May 31;9(95):eadj2654. doi: 10.1126/sciimmunol.adj2654. Epub 2024 May 31. PMID: 38820141
- Christo SN, Evrard M, Park SL, et al. (September 2021). Discrete tissue microenvironments instruct diversity in resident memory T cell function and plasticity. Nat Immunol. 22(9):1140-1151. doi: 10.1038/s41590-021-01004-1. PMID 34426691
- Huang Q, Jacquelot N, Preaudet A, et al. (February 2021). Type 2 Innate Lymphoid Cells Protect against Colorectal Cancer Progression and Predict Improved Patient Survival. Cancers (Basel). 1;13(3):559. doi: 10.3390/cancers13030559. PMID 33535624
- Jacquelot N, Seillet C, Wang M, et al. (July 2021). Blockade of the co-inhibitory molecule PD-1 unleashes ILC2-dependent antitumor immunity in melanoma. Nat Immunol. 22(7):851-864. doi: 10.1038/s41590-021-00943-z. PMID 34099918
- Seillet C, Luong K, Tellier J, et al. (February 2020). The neuropeptide VIP confers anticipatory mucosal immunity by regulating ILC3 activity. Nat Immunol. 21(2):168-177. doi: 10.1038/s41590-019-0567-y. PMID 31873294
- Soon MSF, Lee HJ, Engel JA, et al. (December 2020). Transcriptome dynamics of CD4+ T cells during malaria maps gradual transit from effector to memory. Nat Immunol. 21(12):1597-1610. doi: 10.1038/s41590-020-0800-8. PMID 33046889
- Mielke LA, Liao Y, Clemens EB, et al. (July 2019). TCF-1 limits the formation of Tc17 cells via repression of the MAF-RORγt axis. J Exp Med. 1;216(7):1682-1699. doi: 10.1084/jem.20181778. PMID 31142588
- Rankin LC, Girard-Madoux MJ, Seillet C, et al. (February 2016). Complementarity and redundancy of IL-22-producing innate lymphoid cells. Nat Immunol. 17(2):179-86. doi: 10.1038/ni.3332. PMID 26595889
- Seillet C, Huntington ND, Gangatirkar P, et al. (March 2014). "Differential requirement for Nfil3 during NK cell development". Journal of Immunology. 192 (6): 2667–76. doi:10.4049/jimmunol.1302605. PMID 24532575.
- Rankin LC, Groom JR, Chopin M, et al. (April 2013). "The transcription factor T-bet is essential for the development of NKp46+ innate lymphocytes via the Notch pathway". Nature Immunology. 14 (4): 389–95. doi:10.1038/ni.2545. PMC 4076532. PMID 23455676.
- Masson F, Minnich M, Olshansky M, et al. (May 2013). "Id2-mediated inhibition of E2A represses memory CD8+ T cell differentiation". Journal of Immunology. 190 (9): 4585–94. doi:10.4049/jimmunol.1300099. PMC 3631715. PMID 23536629.
- Seillet C, Jackson JT, Markey KA, et al. (February 2013). "CD8α+ DCs can be induced in the absence of transcription factors Id2, Nfil3, and Batf3". Blood. 121 (9): 1574–83. doi:10.1182/blood-2012-07-445650. PMID 23297132.
- Allan RS, Zueva E, Cammas F, et al. (July 2012). "An epigenetic silencing pathway controlling T helper 2 cell lineage commitment". Nature. 487 (7406): 249–53. Bibcode:2012Natur.487..249A. doi:10.1038/nature11173. PMID 22763435. S2CID 4398821.
- Belz GT, Nutt SL (February 2012). "Transcriptional programming of the dendritic cell network". Nature Reviews. Immunology. 12 (2): 101–13. doi:10.1038/nri3149. PMID 22273772. S2CID 28422308.
- Jackson JT, Hu Y, Liu R, et al. (July 2011). "Id2 expression delineates differential checkpoints in the genetic program of CD8α+ and CD103+ dendritic cell lineages". The EMBO Journal. 30 (13): 2690–704. doi:10.1038/emboj.2011.163. PMC 3155298. PMID 21587207.
- Kallies A, Xin A, Belz GT, Nutt SL (August 2009). "Blimp-1 transcription factor is required for the differentiation of effector CD8(+) T cells and memory responses". Immunity. 31 (2): 283–95. doi:10.1016/j.immuni.2009.06.021. PMID 19664942.
- Allan RS, Smith CM, Belz GT, et al. (September 2003). "Epidermal viral immunity induced by CD8alpha+ dendritic cells but not by Langerhans cells". Science. 301 (5641): 1925–8. Bibcode:2003Sci...301.1925A. doi:10.1126/science.1087576. PMID 14512632. S2CID 25655843.
- Belz GT, Smith CM, Kleinert L, et al. (June 2004). "Distinct migrating and nonmigrating dendritic cell populations are involved in MHC class I-restricted antigen presentation after lung infection with virus". Proceedings of the National Academy of Sciences of the United States of America. 101 (23): 8670–5. Bibcode:2004PNAS..101.8670B. doi:10.1073/pnas.0402644101. PMC 423253. PMID 15163797.
