= Immunology & Cell Biology =

- Discipline: immunology
- Language: English
- Edited by: Adrian Liston

Publication details
- History: 1924–present
- Publisher: John Wiley & Sons, Inc. (United States)
- Frequency: Monthly
- Impact factor: 5.126 (2021)

Standard abbreviations
- ISO 4: Immunol. Cell Biol.

Indexing
- ISSN: 0818-9641 (print); 1440-1711 (web)

Links
- Journal homepage; Australian and New Zealand Society for Immunology

Immunology & Cell Biology (ICB) is an academic journal of the Australia and New Zealand Society for Immunology covering basic immunology research. The journal has a focus on cellular immunology, innate and adaptive immunity, immune responses to pathogens, tumour immunology, immunopathology, immunotherapy, immunogenetics and immunological studies in humans and model organisms (including mouse, rat, Drosophila etc.).

== History ==
=== The Australian Journal of Experimental Biology and Medical Science ===
The inaugural (monthly) meeting of The Medical Sciences Club of South Australia was held at the University of Adelaide on 16 April 1920. The fourteen medical men and scientists who attended the meeting appointed Dr Harry Swift as its temporary chairman, and Professor T. Brailsford Robertson as its temporary secretary.

The publication of The Australian Journal of Experimental Biology and Medical Science (first issue 15 March 1924), by The Medical Sciences Club of South Australia, was made possible over its first two years by funding from the Keith Sheridan Bequest; and for the next 26 years (1926–1951) it was funded by the specific endowment of Sir Joseph Cooke Verco. In 1930, upon the death of Brailsford Robertson, Charles J. Martin became the journal's editor, and served until 1936.

==== Significant contributions ====
Major historical contributions including publication by Donald Metcalf of the strategy for identifying colony-stimulating factors (CSFs) and the development of the clonal selection theory by Frank Macfarlane Burnet, in a series of more than 90 publications in the 1970s.

=== Immunology and Cell Biology ===
The last issue of The Australian Journal of Experimental Biology and Medical Science, Volume 64, Number 6, was published in December 1986; and, in 1987, the journal was re-named Immunology and Cell Biology, making the journal one of the oldest, continuous, speciality immunology journals in existence.

== Editorial staff ==
The journal's editor-in-chief is Adrian Liston, with Jonathan Coquet, James Harris, Kate Lawlor, Michelle Linterman, and Fabio Luciani serving as deputy editors. Ashraful Haque and Joanne Reed are News & Commentary Editors, with Jessica Borger as Immunology Futures Editor.

== Sister Journal ==
ICB has a sister journal, Clinical and Translational Immunology, which was founded in 2012 in response to a growing need for publishing clinically-orientated research papers in the field of immunology.

Both Immunology & Cell Biology and Clinical & Translational Immunology offer prestigious Publication of the Year Awards and Social Impact Awards to their authors: and, each year, the ASI Annual Scientific Meeting hosts a dedicated workshop session to recognise the authors of top papers published in the two journals.
