= Michelle Linterman =

New Zealand immunologist

- Born: Michelle Linterman; Christchurch, New Zealand
- Education: Victoria University of Wellington; Australian National University
- Scientific career
- Workplaces: Babraham Institute
- Thesis: Roquin controls germinal center formation and tolerance (2009)

Michelle Linterman (born 1983) is a New Zealand immunologist. She is a group leader at the Babraham Institute in the United Kingdom, where she researches the biology of the germinal center response after immunisation and infection.

== Early life and education ==
Linterman was born in Christchurch, New Zealand, the daughter of Louisa and Robert Linterman, and grew up in Waikanae. She undertook undergraduate studies in biomedical sciences at Victoria University of Wellington (VUW) at the same time that a scientific revolution was occurring in genetics, and graduated with a Bachelor of Biomedical Sciences degree in 2005.

Linterman went to Canberra and completed a summer studentship with Carola Vinuesa at the Australian National University (ANU). Linterman ended up staying at ANU for a year to work on human genetics, before deciding to complete a doctorate. She started working with genetically modified mice to better understand disease. Vinuesa had just discovered RC3H1 using these mice, and Linterman decided to study why these mice had systemic lupus–like disease. At the time, follicular B helper T cells (Tfh) started attracting considerable research interest. Tfh are critical for germinal centre formation, and mice in Linterman's lab (with the Roquin^{san/san} sanroque mutation) spontaneously formed Tfh cells that contributed to the systemic lupus erythematosus that plagued these mice. She discovered that a proportion of these Tfh cells expressed FOXP3, a transcription factor involved in immune system responses.

Linterman moved to the University of Cambridge as a postdoctoral researcher, where she studied the fundamental biology of Tfh cells. Still fascinated by the mechanisms that underpin FOXP3 regulation, Linterman started exploring Tfh cells in vivo.

== Research and career ==
Linterman formed a research group at the Babraham Institute, where she studies germinal centre biology and how the immune system responds to vaccination. Germinal centres are sites within biological tissue (e.g. in the spleen, tonsils and lymph nodes) where B cells reproduce, replicate and differentiate as the immune system responds to infection. The germinal centre teaches the immune system how to respond more rapidly and effectively to future pathogens, and is critical for effective response to vaccination. The magnitude of the germinal centre response diminishes with age, largely due to the role of T cells. Linterman investigates the role of the germinal centre in ageing, and how they form non-lymphoid tissues. She found that a cascade of events creates germinal centres that help to create cross-reactive antibodies.

In 2019, Linterman was awarded the Lister Institute Research Prize Fellowship for her efforts to understand the flu infection. She discovered that the body remodels lung tissue to contribute to the immune system response and produce more antibodies.

== Selected publications ==
- Di Yu; Sudha Rao; Louis M Tsai; et al. (2009). "The transcriptional repressor Bcl-6 directs T follicular helper cell lineage commitment". Immunity. 31 (3): 457–468. doi:10.1016/j.immuni.2009.07.002. PMID 19631565. Wikidata Q50736370.
- Linterman, Michelle Angela; Wim Pierson; Sau K Lee; et al. (2011). "Foxp3+ follicular regulatory T cells control the germinal center response". Nature medicine. 17 (8): 975–982. doi:10.1038/nm.2425. PMC 3182542. PMID 21785433. Wikidata Q35239023.
- Linterman, Michelle Angela; Laura Beaton; Di Yu; et al. (2010). "IL-21 acts directly on B cells to regulate Bcl-6 expression and germinal center responses". Journal of Experimental Medicine. 207 (2): 353–363. doi:10.1084/jem.20091738. PMC 2822609. PMID 20142429. Wikidata Q33656146.
