= William MacCormac =

19th-century Anglo-Irish surgeon

Sir William MacCormac, 1st Baronet
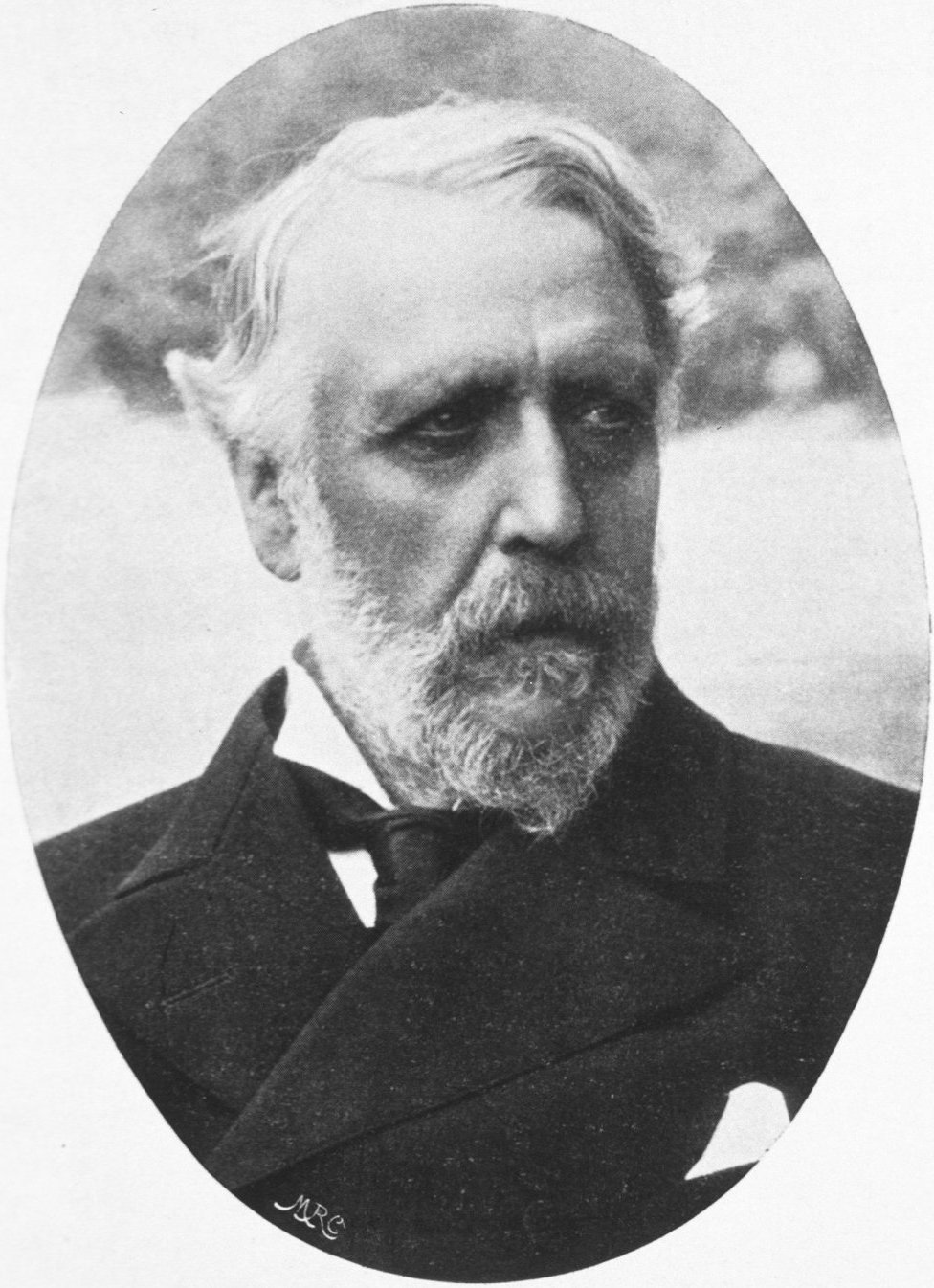
- Sir William MacCormac, 1st Baronet
- Born: William MacCormac; 17 January 1836; Belfast, Ireland
- Died: 4 December 1901 (aged 65); Bath, Somerset, England
- Education: Royal Armagh School, Queen's University
- Spouse: Katherine Maria Charters
- Medical career
- Profession: Surgeon

Sir William MacCormac, 1st Baronet, KCB, KCVO (17 January 1836 – 4 December 1901) was a notable British surgeon during the nineteenth and early twentieth centuries. MacCormac was a strong advocate of the antiseptic surgical methods proposed by Joseph Lister and he served in conflicts such as the Boer War. An advocate and pioneer of the Royal Army Medical Corps, MacCormac was perhaps the most decorated surgeon in Britain and he served as Serjeant Surgeon to Edward VII.

== Early life and background ==
William MacCormac was born in Belfast, Ireland, the son of Dr Henry MacCormac, a notable Irish physician, and his wife Mary MacCormac (née Newsam), the daughter of a prominent Anglo-Irish family. Dr. Henry MacCormac was a well traveled physician and a lifelong proponent of the "open air theory" that stated that fresh air was conducive in order to prevent illnesses.

The MacCormac family was originally from County Armagh and descended from Cornelius MacCormac, a high-ranking Irish naval officer.

== Education ==
MacCormac studied medicine and surgery at Belfast, Dublin and Paris, and graduated in arts, medicine and surgery at the Queen's University, Belfast, in which he afterwards became an examiner in surgery.

== Career ==
He began practice in Belfast, where he became surgeon to the General Hospital, but left it for London on his marriage in 1861 to Miss Katherine M. Charters. In the Franco-Prussian War of 1870 he was surgeon-in-chief to the Anglo-American Ambulance, and was present at Sedan. He also went through the First Serbian–Ottoman War of 1876. He became in this way an authority on gunshot wounds, and besides. Besides his professional success, he was popular in society for his build, temperament and personality.

In 1881, he was appointed assistant-surgeon at St Thomas' Hospital, London and for twenty year continued his work here as a surgeon, lecturer and consulting surgeon. In 1881, he acted as honorary secretary-general of the International Medical Congress in London and was knighted for his services. In 1883 he was elected member of the council of college of surgeons and in 1887 a member of the court of examiners; in 1893 he delivered the Bradshaw lecture and in 1896 was elected president, being reelected to this office in 1897, 1998, 1899, and 1900 (the centenary year of the college). On 24 September 1897, he was created a baronet; and he was appointed surgeon in ordinary to the Prince of Wales. His services were required the following year, when the Prince had an accident to his knee. MacCormac subsequently was appointed Knight Commander of the Royal Victorian Order (KCVO) in September 1898. In 1899, he was Hunterian Orator.

After the outbreak of the Second Boer War in October 1899, MacCormac volunteered to go out to South Africa as a consulting surgeon to the forces, and from November 1899 to March 1900 he saw much active service both in Cape Colony and Natal. He accompanied Lord Roberts on his visit to Kimberley after a siege of that city had been lifted in February 1900, and the following month visited Ladysmith when that city was relieved from a siege. He left South Africa on board the German liner Kaiser in mid-March 1900. His assistance to the British war effort was acknowledged on his return when he was appointed a Knight Commander of the Order of the Bath (KCB) for his services.

== Later life ==
In February 1901, he was appointed honorary sergeant-surgeon to the new King Edward VII, and in June 1901 he received an honorary doctorate (LL.D) from the University of Glasgow. But, during 1898 he had suffered from prolonged illness and perhaps too much strain on his strength, for he died on 4 December 1901, somewhat suddenly at Bath. He is buried with his wife, Katherine Maria MacCormac, at Kensal Green Cemetery, London.

== Personal life and family ==
In 1861, MacCormac married Katherine Maria Charters (1835–1923), daughter of John Charters of Belfast. Although MacCormac had no issue from this union, he had numerous distinguished relatives. MacCormac's nephew, Dr. Henry MacCormac (1879 – 12 December 1950), was a successful dermatologist and the father of Sir Richard MacCormac, a notable modernist architect and the founder of MJP Architects.

MacCormac was also the uncle of Sierra Leonean physician, Dr. John Farrell Easmon. When MacCormac served as a house surgeon to Queen Victoria, he invited Easmon to serve as his understudy due to the latter's distinguished academic career. However, Easmon turned down MacCormac's offer and position, and instead chose to serve as a medical doctor in Freetown, Sierra Leone, and the Gold Coast. Easmon was eventually promoted to the position of Chief Medical Officer of the Gold Coast in 1893.

== Published works ==
Besides treaties on surgical operations, antiseptic surgery, and numerous contributions to the medical journals, MacCormac was the author of works under the Red Cross and of an interesting volume commemorating the centenary of the Royal College of Surgeons of England in 1900. The latter contains biographical notices of all the masters and presidents up to that date.

== Honours ==
MacCormac baronets
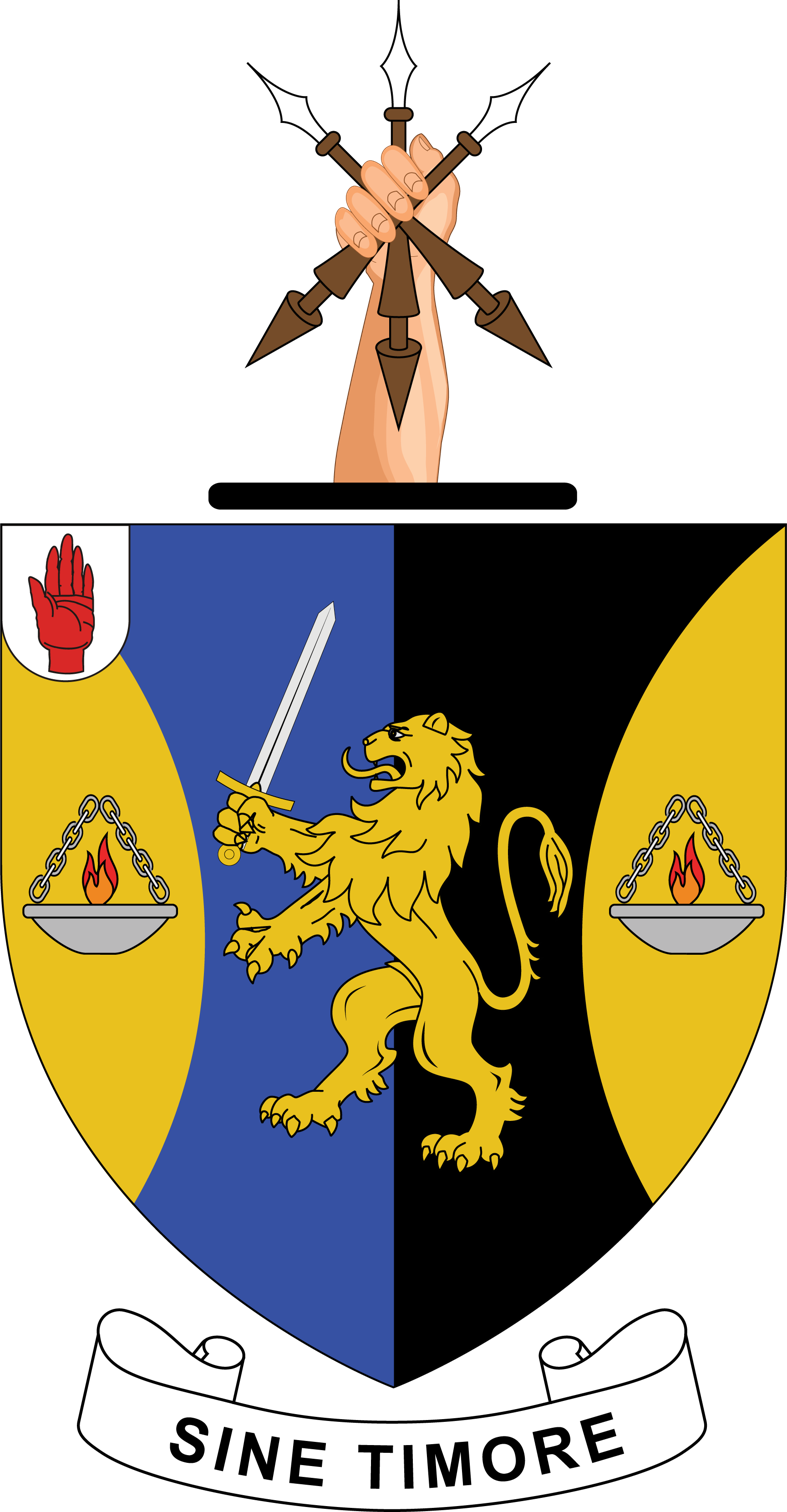
- Arms of the MacCormac baronets of Harley Street
- Creation date: 1897
- Status: extinct
- Extinction date: 1901
- Motto: Sine timore, Without fear
- Arms: Per pale Azure and Sable, a lion rampant, Or, holding in the dexter fore paw a sword, proper, pomel and hilt of the third, two flaunches of the last, each charged with a lamp suspended by chains, proper
- Crest: An arm, coupled, grasping three tilting spears, all proper

British orders and decorations

- KCVO: Knight Commander of the Royal Victorian Order – 1898
- KCB: Knight Commander of the Order of the Bath – 29 November 1900 – for services during the Second Boer War

Foreign orders and decorations

- (France) : Officer of the Legion of Honour
- (Denmark) : Commander of the Order of the Dannebrog
- (Kingdom of Italy) : Commander of the Order of the Crown of Italy
- (Kingdom of Serbia) : Commander of the Order of Takovo
- (Kingdom of Prussia) : Order of the Crown
- (Sweden) : Order of the Polar Star
- (Kingdom of Portugal) : Order of Saint James of the Sword
- (Kingdom of Bavaria) : Ritterkreuz of one of the Orders
- (Spain) : Order of Military Merit
- (Ottoman Empire) : Order of Medjidie

== Gallery ==
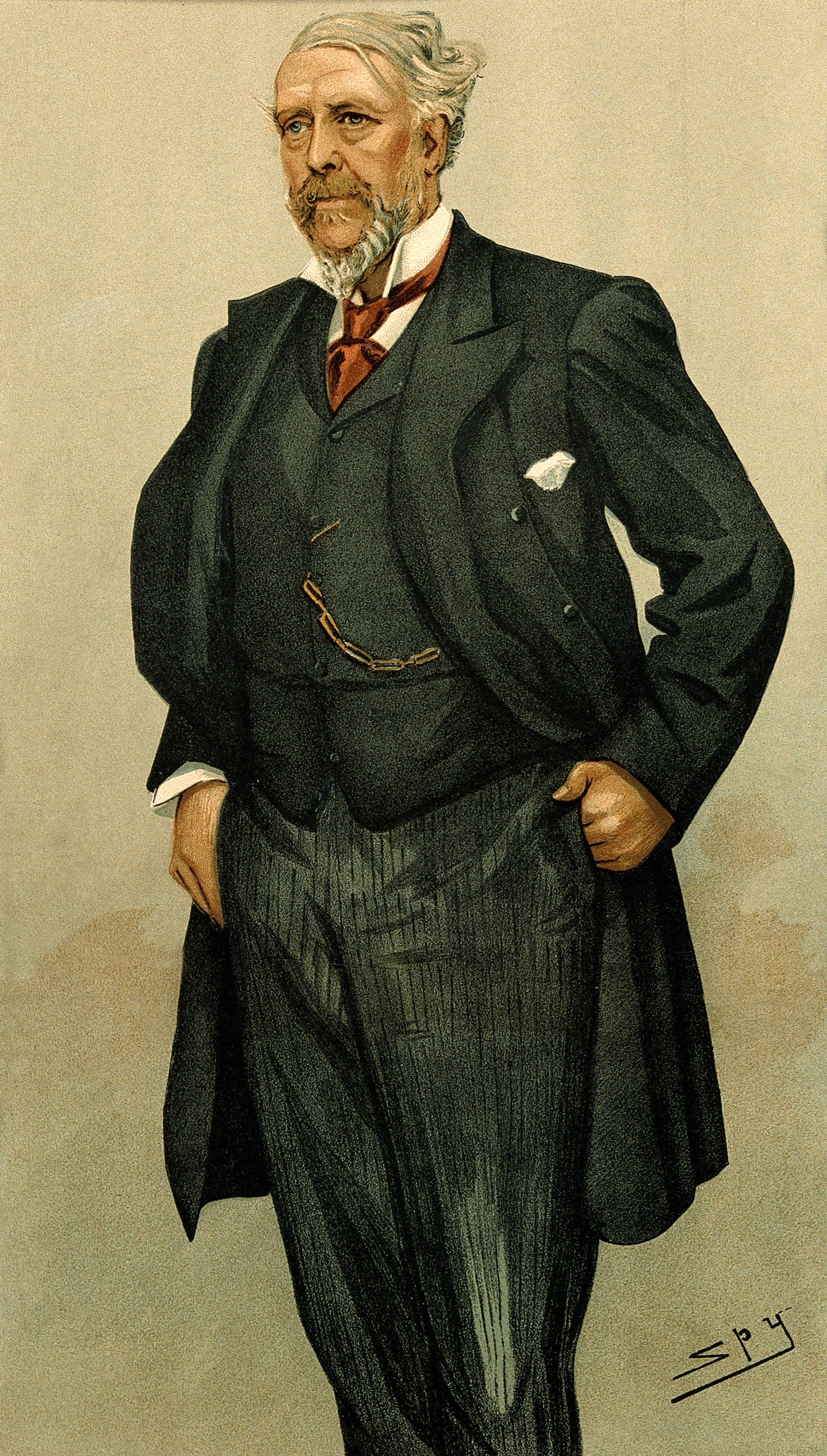
McCormac caricatured for Vanity Fair, 1896

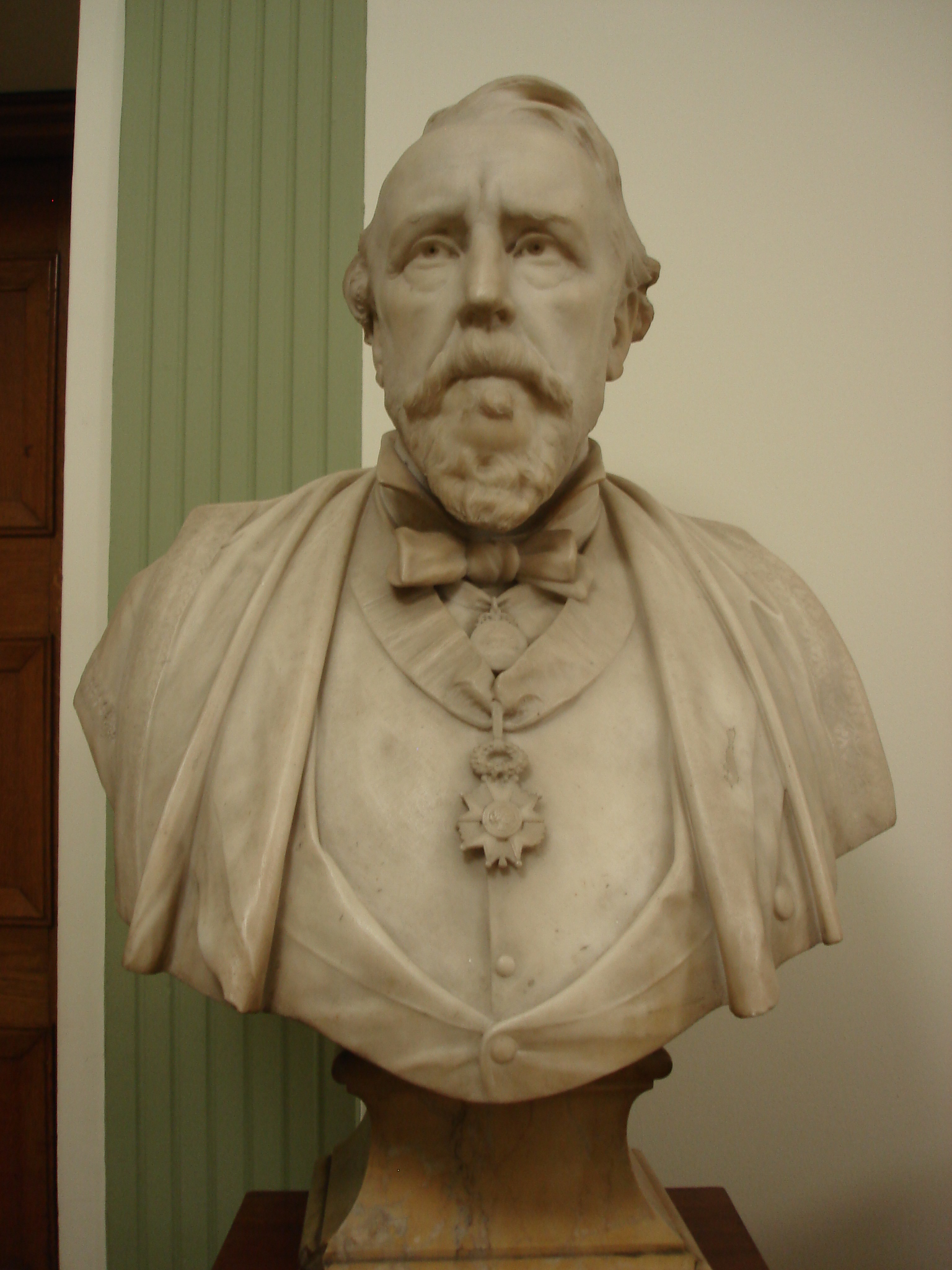
Bust of Sir William MacCormac by Alfred Drury

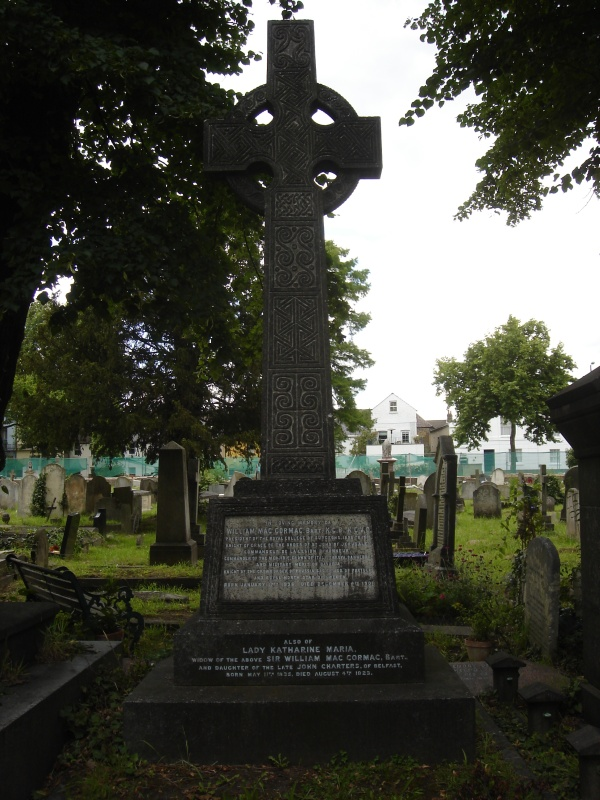
Funerary monument, Kensal Green Cemetery, London

Baronetage of the United Kingdom
New creation	Baronet (of Harley Street); 1897–1901	Extinct
Preceded by Wood baronets	MacCormac baronets of Harley Street; 24 September 1897	Succeeded by Paget baronets
