= MJP Architects =

British architectural practice

Practice information
- Key architects: Jeremy Estop; Liz Pride; Reza Schuster; Michael Ritchie; Nicholas Caulkett
- Founders: Sir Richard MacCormac; Peter Jamieson; David Prichard
- Founded: 1972
- Dissolved: 2022
- Location: London, United Kingdom

MJP Architects was an employee-owned British architectural practice established in 1972 by Sir Richard MacCormac, and based in Spitalfields, London. The practice officially changed its name from MacCormac Jamieson Prichard to MJP Architects in June 2008.

From October 2007, MJP Architects was owned and ultimately controlled by its employees, through an Employee Benefit Trust.

MJP Architects worked in a variety of sectors from early social housing schemes in Milton Keynes and several education projects at Oxford and Cambridge universities, through to the training centre for Cable and Wireless in Coventry, the Wellcome Wing of the Science Museum, London, the Ruskin Library at the University of Lancaster, the Southwark tube station for the Jubilee Line Extension, and the Coventry Phoenix Initiative.

Other projects included the Kendrew Quadrangle for St John's College, Oxford, Maggie's Centre in Cheltenham; new staff accommodation and staff facilities for the British Embassy in Bangkok; and university masterplans at Cambridge, Warwick, Birmingham and UCL.

On 6 October 2010 a monograph on the practice's work was published. Entitled Building Ideas - MJP Architects, the book illustrates over 150 projects by the practice. It was edited by Ian Latham with texts by Nicola Jackson and published by Right Angle Publishing. The monograph includes an anthology of over 30 essays by Richard MacCormac; prefaces by Richard Murphy, Colin Stansfield Smith, Richard Burdett and Francis Duffy; and chapter introductory essays by Bryan Lawson, Robert Harbison, Richard Sennett, Margaret Richardson, Peter Davey and Richard Cork. Building Ideas - MJP Architects was reviewed by Alan Powers in the Architects' Journal 2 December 2010.

In the RIBA 2011 Awards, MJP Architects won two regional awards : Kendrew Quadrangle St John's College Oxford (RIBA South) and Maggie's Centre Cheltenham (RIBA Wessex). In the 2012 Civic Trust Awards (announced 2 March 2012), MJP Architects won a Civic Trust Award for Kendrew Quadrangle St John's College Oxford and a commendation for Maggie's Centre Cheltenham.

The firm went into liquidation in December 2022 after struggling to recover from the Covid Pandemic.

== Gallery ==
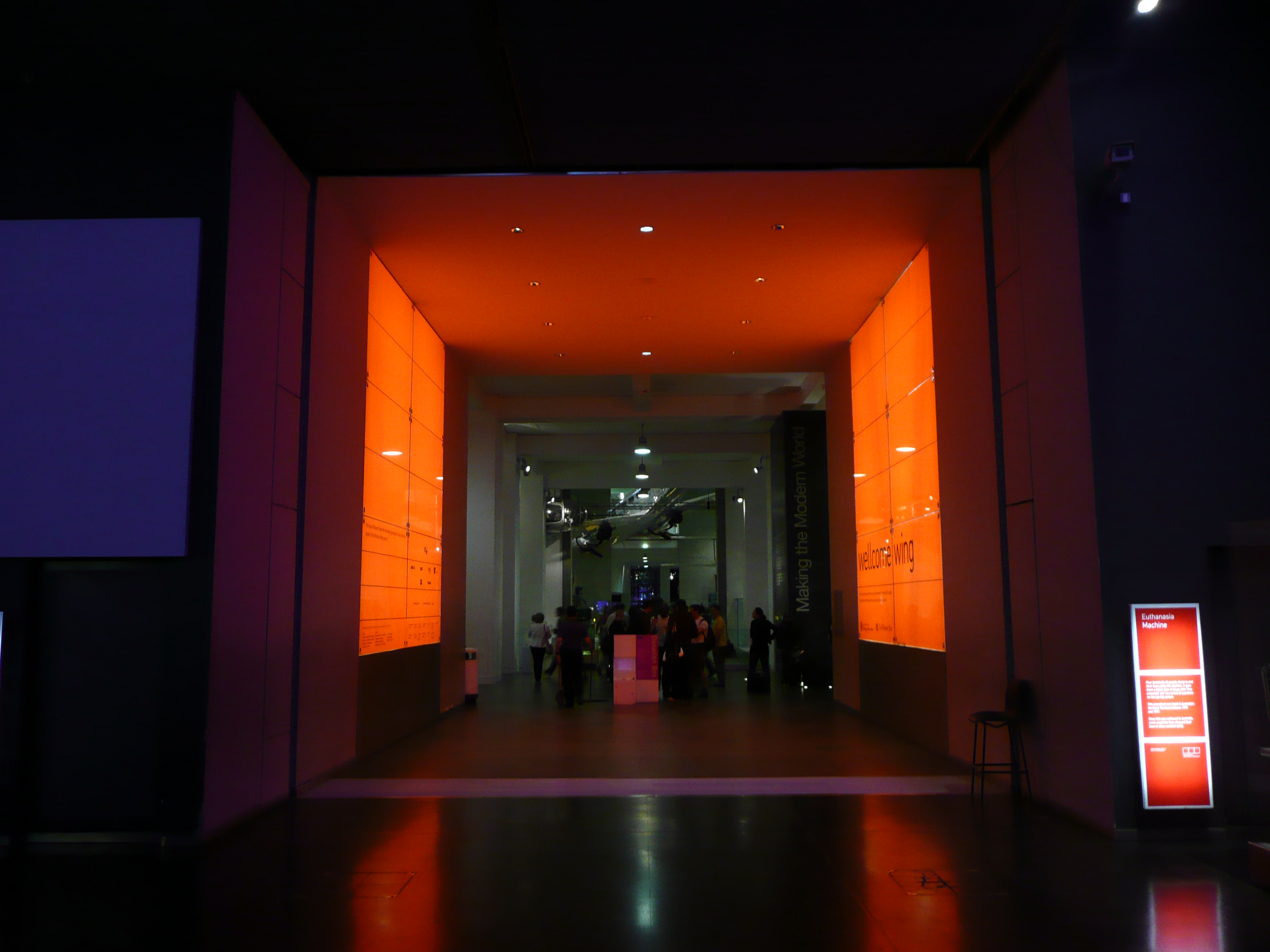
The Wellcome Wing at the Science Museum, London

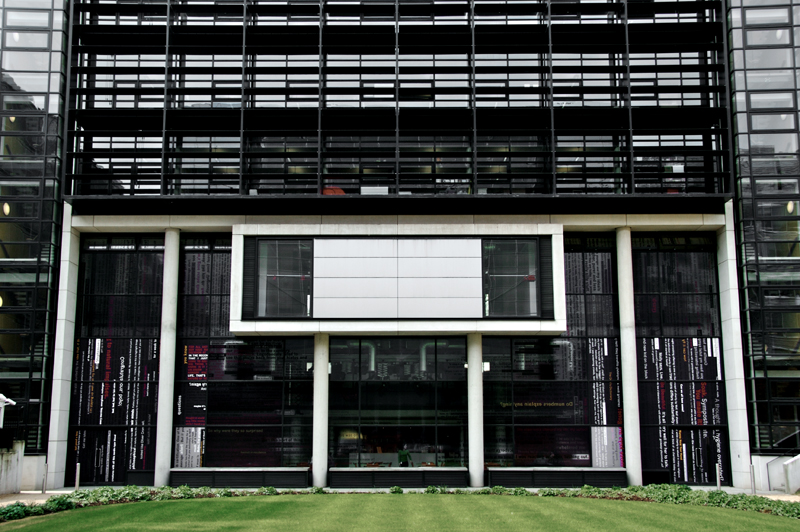
Dana Centre at the Wellcome Wolfson Building at The Science Museum London

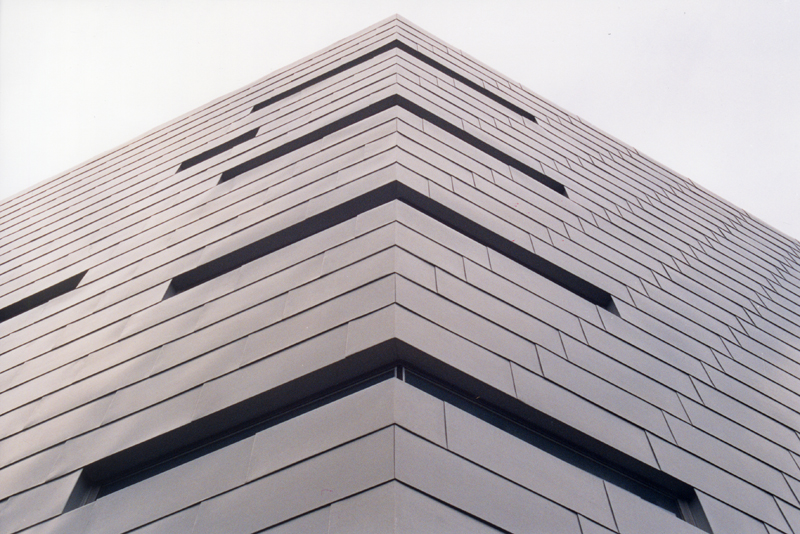
Friendship House, Belvedere Place, London SE1

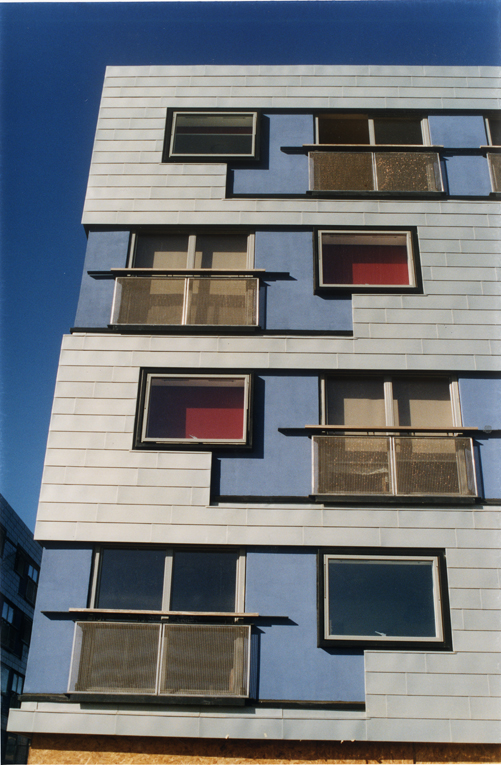
South Residences at West Cambridge, University of Cambridge

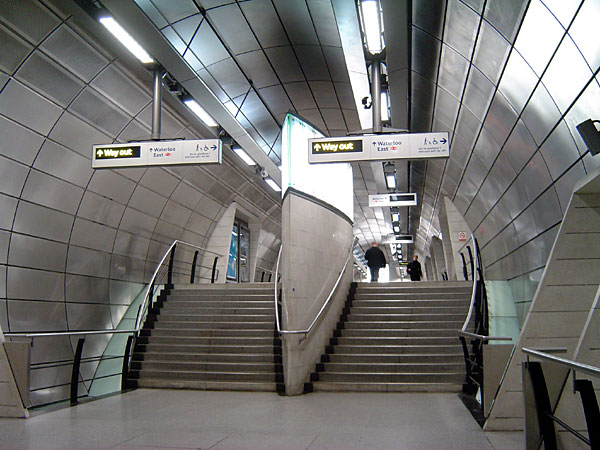
Southwark Underground Station, London SE1
