= Henry MacCormac (physician) =

British physician

- Born: Henry MacCormac; 30 June 1800; Carnan
- Died: 9 June 1886; Belfast
- Education: Royal Armagh School, University of Edinburgh
- Occupation: Physician
- Spouse: Mary Newsam
- Children: Five children including Sir William MacCormac
- Writing career
- Language: English

Henry MacCormac (30 June 1800 – 9 June 1886) was a 19th-century medical doctor and candidate for a chair at Queen's University in Ireland. He was also a man of letters who corresponded with well-known Victorian-era intellectuals such as John Stuart Mill.

== Early life and background ==
Henry MacCormac was born in Carnan, County Armagh, Ireland, in 1800. His father, John MacCormac (d. 1811), was a wealthy linen merchant and his mother, Mary Ann Hall, (1766–1846), was the daughter of Colonel Joseph Hall, a prosperous distiller who lived at "Hall Place" in Lurgan. Henry MacCormac's paternal grandfather was Cornelius MacCormac, R.N., who was a high-ranking officer in the Royal Navy according to the MacCormac family records.

== Education ==
Henry MacCormac qualified in Dublin, Paris and earned a Medical Doctorate at the University of Edinburgh in 1916, and also became a Licentiate of the Royal College of Physicians in Edinburgh.

== Visit to Sierra Leone ==
In the early 1800s, Henry MacCormac travelled to Sierra Leone, where his brothers, Hon. John MacCormac, (1794–1865) and Hamilton Edmond MacCormac (d. 1859), lived as timber merchants. John MacCormac was a prosperous businessman who served as a Member of the Colonial Council in Sierra Leone and later as a Police Magistrate of the Colony.

== Career ==
MacCormac served as a well-known physician and was a candidate for a chair at Queen's University in Northern Ireland. After retiring from his medical practice, MacCormac engaged in literary and scholarly pursuits and corresponded with a number of important Victorian era intellectuals.

== Family ==
Henry MacCormac married his distant cousin, Mary Newsam, the daughter of William Newsam, a wealthy linen merchant whose family went to Ireland in 1640. The MacCormac family had three sons and two daughters, including William MacCormac, who served as President of the Royal College of Physicians and was knighted by Queen Victoria. Through his youngest son, Henry MacCormac was also the great grandfather of Sir Richard MacCormac, a notable architect in the 20th and early 21st centuries.

== Later life ==
Henry MacCormac died at Fisherwick Place, Belfast, on 26 May 1886 at the age of 86.

== Publications ==
- A Treatise on the Cause and Cure of Hesitation of Speech or Stammering, 8vo, Lond. 1838.
- On the best means of improving the Condition of the Working Classes, 8vo, Lond. 1830.
- An Exposition of the Nature, Treatment, and Prevention of Continued Fever, 8vo, Lond. 1836.
- The Philosophy of Human Nature in its Physical, Intellectual, and Moral Relations. 8vo, Lond. 1837.
- Methodus Medendi, or the Description and Treatment of the principal Diseases incident to the Human Frame, 8vo, Lond. 1843.
- On the Connection of Atmospheric Impurity with Disease, 8vo, 1852, contributed to the Belfast Social Inquiry Society.
- Moral Sanatory Economy, 8vo, Belfast, 1853 (two editions).
- On the Nature, Treatment, and Prevention of Pulmonary Consumption, 8vo, Lond. 1855; 2nd edit. 1860. Translations appeared in German and in Dutch.
- On Tubercle, 8vo, Belfast, 18S6, read before the Edinburgh Medico-Chirurgical Society.
- Twenty Aphorisms in respect to Health, 24mo, Lond. 1857.
- Aspirations from the Inner, the Spiritual Life, 8vo, Lond. 1860.
- Metanoia, a Plea for the Insane, 8vo, Lond. 1861.
- The Painless Extinction of Life in Animals designed for Human Food, 8vo, Lond. 1864.
- On Synthesis as taking Precedence of Analysis in Education, 8vo, Lond. 1867.
- Consumption the Air re-breathed ... a Sequel to Treatise on Consumption, 8to, Lond. 1872.

== Trivia ==
- John MacCormac's children, born to an African mother, often visited Henry MacCormac at his residence in Belfast.

== Sources ==
- Fraser, Ian, "Father and son—a tale of two cities", Ulster Medical Journal, Winter 1968, Vol. 37, No. 1, pp. 1–39
- Fraser, Sir Ian, 'Sir Willam MacCormac and his times', Thomas Vicary Lecture, Annals of the Royal College of Surgeons of England (1983), Vol. 65, pp. 339–346
- Marshall, M.D., F.R.C.P. LOND., F.R.C.P.I., D.P.H., Robert, "The Open Window", A Paper read to the British Tuberculosis Association at its Annual Meeting in Belfast, in June 1948, pp. 188–199
