= Brittingham =

Brittingham may refer to:

- Brittingham Viking Organization
- Bill Brittingham (born 1923), Australian rules footballer
- Eric Brittingham (born 1960), American guitarist
- Florence V. Brittingham (1856–1891), American poet, short story writer
- Jack Brittingham (born 1958), American director
- Oscar J. Brittingham Jr., American politician
- Warren Brittingham (1886–1962), American soccer player
- Samuel Charles Brittingham (1860–1944) (architect)
- Brittingham Solloway

== See also ==
- Brittingham Prize in Poetry
