= Olivia Opre =

Miss America contestant and Trophy Hunter

- Born: Olivia Nalos; 1977 (age 48–49); Sidney, Nebraska
- Occupation: Hunter
- Known for: Sport Hunting
- Spouse: Tom Opre
- Children: 4

Olivia Nalos Opre is a conservation enthusiast and 2003 Mrs. Nebraska and Mrs. America contestant who lives in Montana.

== Early life ==
Opre developed a love for hunting at 16 years old. She was a Mrs. Nebraska winner in 2003.

== Career ==
Opre is a former Miss Nebraska who competed for the Miss America title. Her controversial career involves trophy hunting. She claims to have hunted on six continents: 100 different species of animals. She has received death threats for her defense of trophy hunting and animal rights advocates have started a petition against her. She has often appeared in news media as an ambassador for trophy hunting. She and her husband host a show on NBC Sports outdoor called, Eye of The Hunter, she also is assists Jack Brittingham's World of Hunting Adventure. In 2015 she wrote an article for USA Today in defense of hunting entitled, "Why we hunt, even lions".

In 2018 she was appointed to the Trump administration's conservation council. At that time the Associated Press reported that Opre killed a hippopotamus, a buffalo, a black rhinoceros and a lion, all in Africa. Opre corrected the AP to say she had not killed a rhinoceros, but used a tranquilizer dart on the animal. Her appointment to the council was widely panned. The council only had one scientific expert; a veterinarian (zoo medicine) Jenifer Chatfield.

In 2020 Opre hunted a rare Alpine ibex in Valais Switzerland. The hunt of the Ibex sparked a protest and another petition which accumulated 75,000 signatures. The Swiss defended the hunt saying the hunt was designed to cull the herd of older males, and the fee of $20,000 is used to subsidize local hunting permits.

Opre is often mentioned when there is criticism of trophy hunters, especially women hunters.

== See also ==
- Animal–industrial complex
- Animal rights
- Big-game hunting
- Green hunting
- International Council for Game and Wildlife Conservation (CIC)
