= The Ritz Hotel, London =

Luxury hotel in London, England

Coordinates: 51°30′26″N 0°08′29″W

The Ritz London

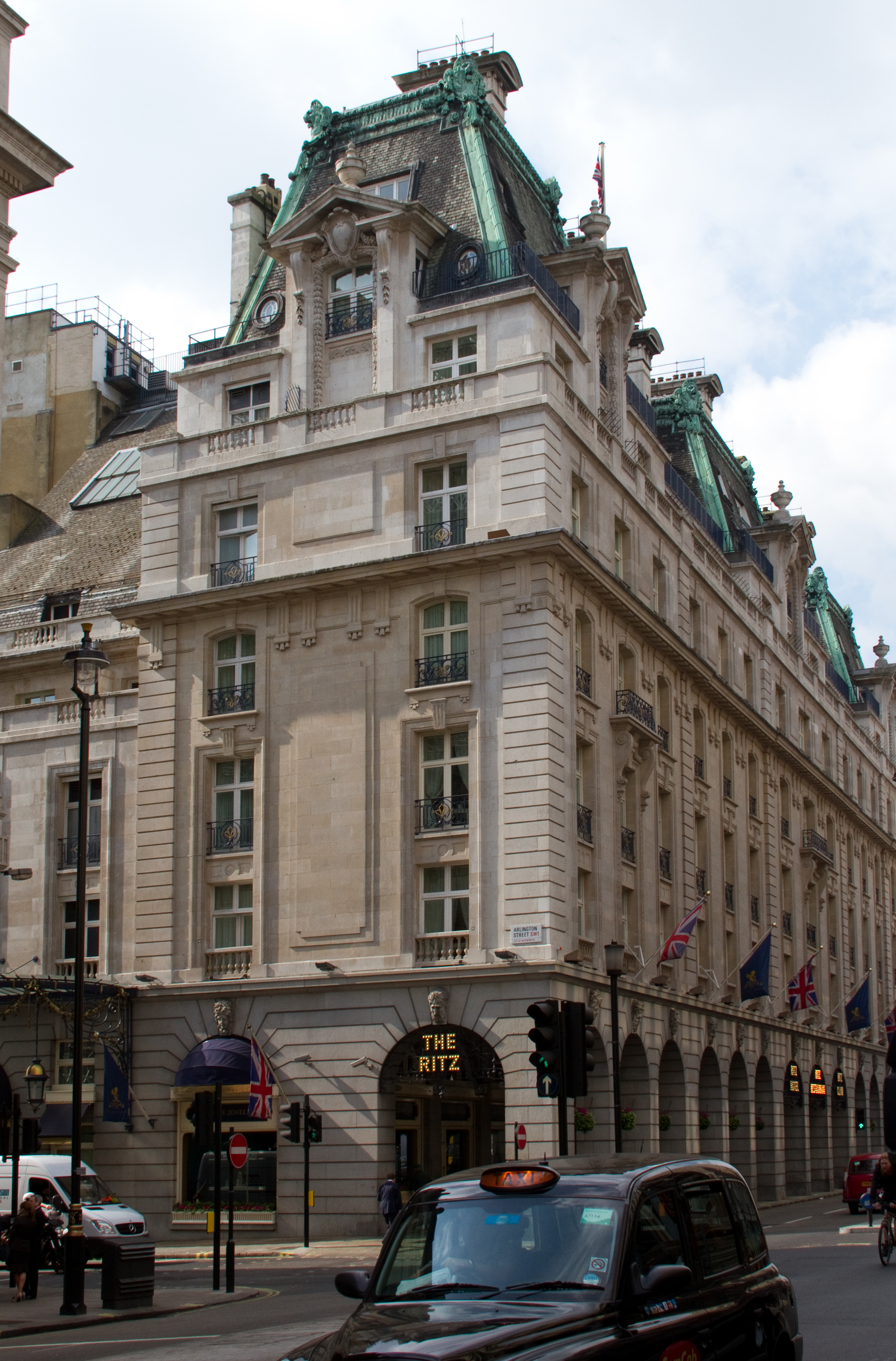

General information
- Type: Luxury hotel
- Location: 150 Piccadilly, London, United Kingdom
- Opened: 24 May 1906; 120 years ago
- Owner: Abdulhadi Mana Al-Hajri
- Affiliation: The Walpole Committee

Design and construction
- Architects: Charles Mewès; Arthur Davis
- Developer: César Ritz

Other information
- Number of rooms: 111
- Number of suites: 23
- Number of restaurants: 3

Website
- www.theritzlondon.com

The Ritz London is a 5-star luxury hotel at 150 Piccadilly in London, England. A symbol of high society and luxury, it is considered one of the world's most prestigious and best known hotels. The Ritz has become so associated with luxury and elegance that the word "ritzy" has entered the English language to denote something that is ostentatiously stylish, fancy, or fashionable.

The hotel was opened by Swiss hotelier César Ritz in 1906, eight years after he established the Hôtel Ritz Paris. It began to gain popularity towards the end of World War I, with politicians, socialites, writers and actors in particular. David Lloyd George held a number of secret meetings at the Ritz during the latter half of the war, and it was at the Ritz that he made the decision to intervene on behalf of Greece against the Ottoman Empire. Noël Coward was among the diners at the Ritz in the 1920s and 1930s.

The hotel was owned by the Bracewell Smith family until 1976, when David and Frederick Barclay purchased it for £80 million in 1995. They spent eight years and £40 million restoring its former grandeur. In 2002, it became the first hotel to receive a Royal warrant from the Prince of Wales for its banquet and catering services. In 2020, it was sold to a Qatari investor, under a cloud of family tension.

The Grade II listed building's exterior is structurally and visually Franco-American in style, with little trace of English architecture, and it is heavily influenced by the architectural traditions of Paris. The facade is 231 feet (70 m) on the Piccadilly side, 115 feet (35 m) on the Arlington Street side, and 87 feet (27 m) on the Green Park side. At the pavilion roof corners stand large green copper lions, the emblem of the hotel. The Ritz has 111 rooms and 25 suites.

The interior was designed mainly by London and Paris based designers in the Louis XVI style. Architectural historian Marcus Binney describes the great suite of ground-floor rooms as "one of the all-time masterpieces of hotel architecture" and compares it to a royal palace with its "grand vistas, lofty proportions and sparkling chandeliers".

The Ritz's most widely known facility is the Palm Court, which hosts "Tea at the Ritz". It is decorated in a cream-coloured Louis XVI style, with panelled mirrors in gilt-bronze frames. The hotel has six private dining rooms – the Marie Antoinette Suite, with its boiserie, and the rooms within the Grade II* listed William Kent House. The Rivoli Bar, built in the Art Deco style, was designed in 2001 by interior designer Tessa Kennedy to resemble the bar on the Orient Express.

== History ==
=== Construction and early history ===
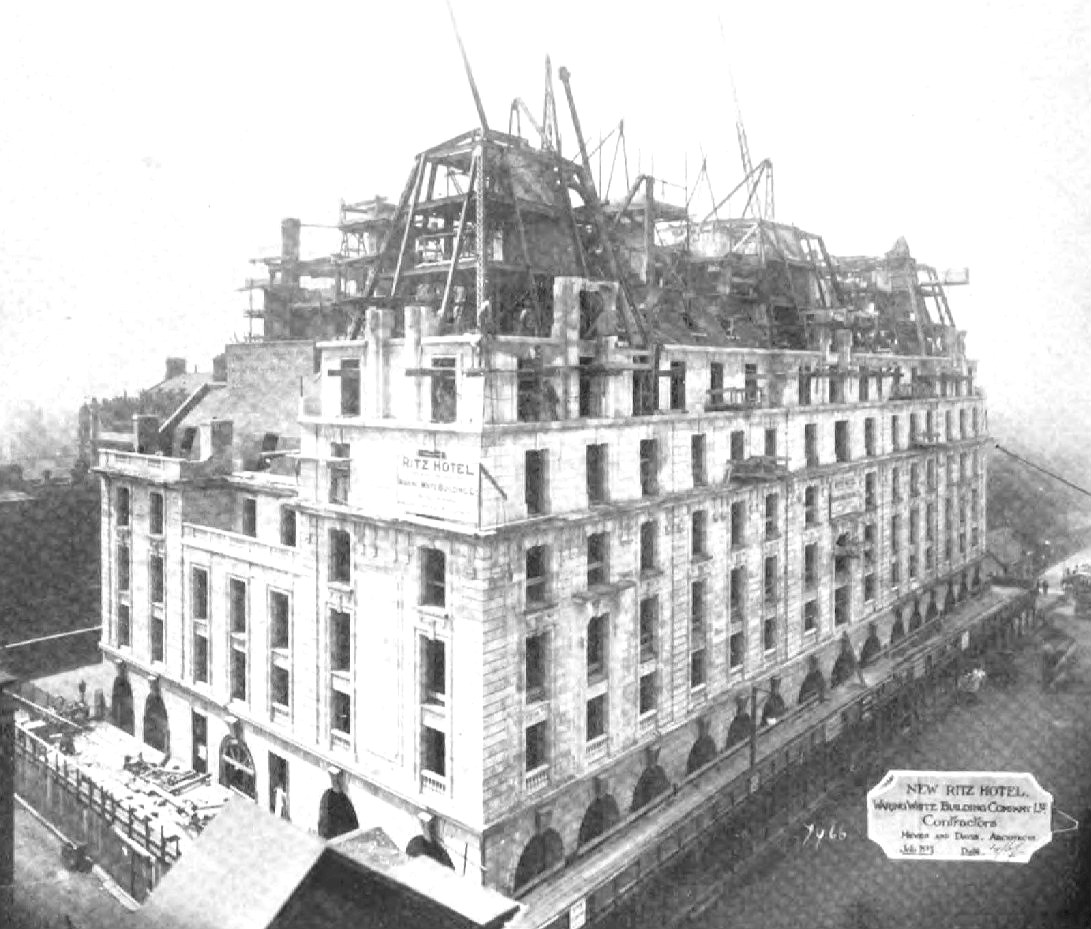
The Ritz under construction in October 1905

Swiss hotelier César Ritz, the former manager of the Savoy Hotel, opened the hotel on 25 May 1906. It was built on the site which had been the Old White Horse Cellar, which by 1805 was one of the best known coaching inns in England. The financial backers of the Ritz felt that they had secured one of the prime sites in London for their project. They began negotiations in 1901, and completed the transactions for the simultaneous purchase of the leasehold for the Walsingham House Hotel and the adjacent freehold estate of the Bath Hotel for £250,000 in 1902. Demolition of both of the hotels began in 1904.

The building is neoclassical in the Louis XVI style, built during the Belle Époque to resemble a Parisian apartment block, over arcades that consciously evoked the Rue de Rivoli. Its architects were Charles Mewès, who had previously designed Ritz's Hôtel Ritz Paris, and Arthur Davis, with engineering collaboration by the Swedish engineer Sven Bylander. It was one of the earliest substantial steel frame structures in London, the Savoy Hotel extension of 1903-04 being the first in the capital. Many of the materials used in the construction of the hotel were US-made. The initial fees for suites ranged from 1½ to 3½ guineas.

After opening, a long-running feud between the hotel and Lord Wimbourne, a steel magnate who lived next door at Wimbourne House, lasted for years in a dispute over land. A number of locals were also concerned about the building and the impact it would have on their health. (Note: The initial plans were for the Ritz to also occupy the site of Wimbourne House, however Lord Wimbourne refused to sell his property to Ritz. One hundred years after César Ritz made an initial offer, the hotel was able to buy the property.)

While the Ritz was still under construction, a series of events highlighted the need for another luxury hotel in London. A 3 June 1905 Daily Mail news story reported it was both Derby Week and the height of the tourist season, making hotel accommodation almost impossible to find. The Savoy had to refuse reservations, while Buckingham Palace turned offices into makeshift hotel rooms for visitors. An estimated 2,500 more persons needing rooms were expected shortly with the coming visit of the King of Spain.

Though the opening of the Savoy had brought about a marked change in how hotels provided services to its guests, Ritz was determined that his London hotel would surpass its competitor in their delivery. (Note: Prior to the opening of the electrically-lit Savoy, hotel guests were billed for the candles used to light their rooms. They were also billed for any services provided by the hotel's staff, as the assumption was that guests would travel with their own servants to tend to their needs.) The Ritz installed two large lead-lined tanks on its roof to provide a steady stream of hot and cold water. The hotel's bathrooms were all spacious with each having its own heated towel bar. Every bedroom in the hotel was provided with its own working fireplace.

Ritz shunned free-standing wardrobes due to his fear of dust settling on them; instead he built cupboards into the rooms with doors matching the panelling. Ritz's ideas of cleanliness and hygiene prompted him to originally have all bedrooms painted in white and all beds made of brass, not wood, for the same reasons. Anything new or potentially useful was available to the guests of the Ritz.

César Ritz's health had declined after his 1902 collapse at the Carlton, but he was feeling well enough to assume an active role in the plans for the hotel's opening dinner on 24 May 1906. Unlike the opening of the Paris Ritz, which had catered to society, most of those invited to the Ritz, London opening were members of the national and international press. Major British newspapers such as the Daily Mail, the Daily Mirror and The Daily Telegraph were invited to the dinner along with newspapers which included the Berliner Tageblatt, The Sydney Morning Herald and The New York Times. Ritz's guest list also included the engineer and architects of the structure along with key staff members of the new hotel and their wives.

The hotel was not immensely profitable in its opening years; smaller than many of the new hotels springing up in that period, it was not fashionable initially, and was resented by many of the London elite who considered it vulgar. (Note: Socialite Lady Diana Cooper later recalled that young single women were not allowed to enter hotels unaccompanied. Her mother made an exception for the Ritz because it was beautiful and her mother appreciated its beauty.) It took £3628 in 1908, over a thousand pounds less than the previous year, and the hotel lost over £50,000 between 15 May 1906 and 31 July 1908, which led to the replacement of the manager Elles with Theodore Kroell and appointment of Charles Van Gyzelen as manager of the restaurant. (Note: At the end of 1908, the hotel's chairman, William Harris, proposed the removal of the name "Ritz" from the hotel. He also proposed the promotion of the Ritz name in North America.)

The hotel also suffered a blow upon the death of King Edward in 1910, when 38 planned dinners and functions were cancelled, but began to prosper the following year, made fashionable by the Prince of Wales who regularly dined here. King Edward was particularly fond of the cakes made at the Ritz. The hotel would regularly send him a supply, but this was kept in confidence so as to not embarrass the King's personal chef. (Note: The King's mistress, Alice Keppel, was a regular patron of the Ritz.) Ritz retained control of much of the hotel's operation for many years. He hired Auguste Escoffier to provide cuisine to match the opulence of the hotel's decorations; he placed a special bell in the entryway by which the doorman could notify the staff of the impending arrival of royalty. By 1929 the hotel was still being praised for its architecture; Professor Charles Reilly wrote about the Ritz in Building magazine in 1929, calling it the "finest modern structure" in the street, with "an elegance of general form".

=== High society ===
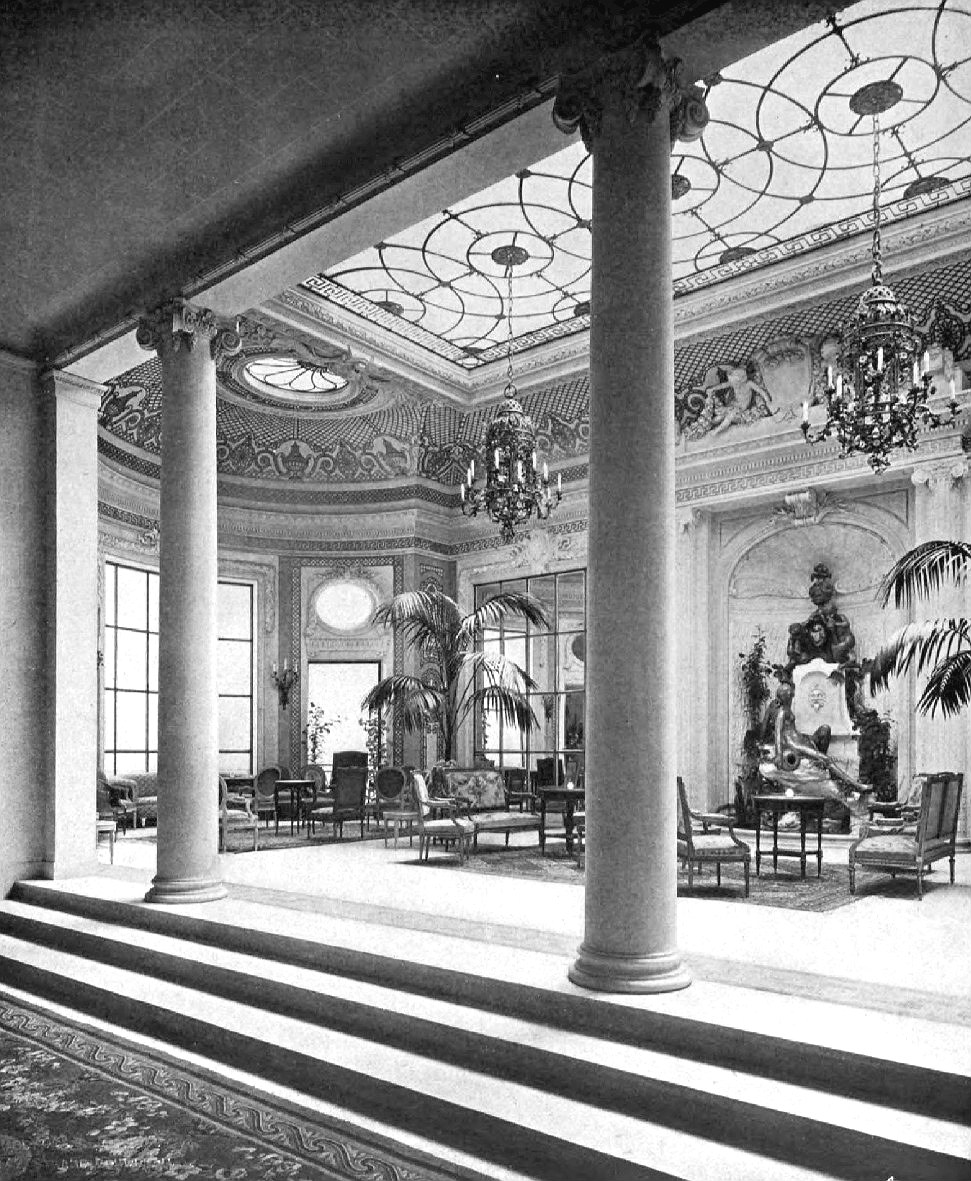
The Palm Court of the Ritz in 1907

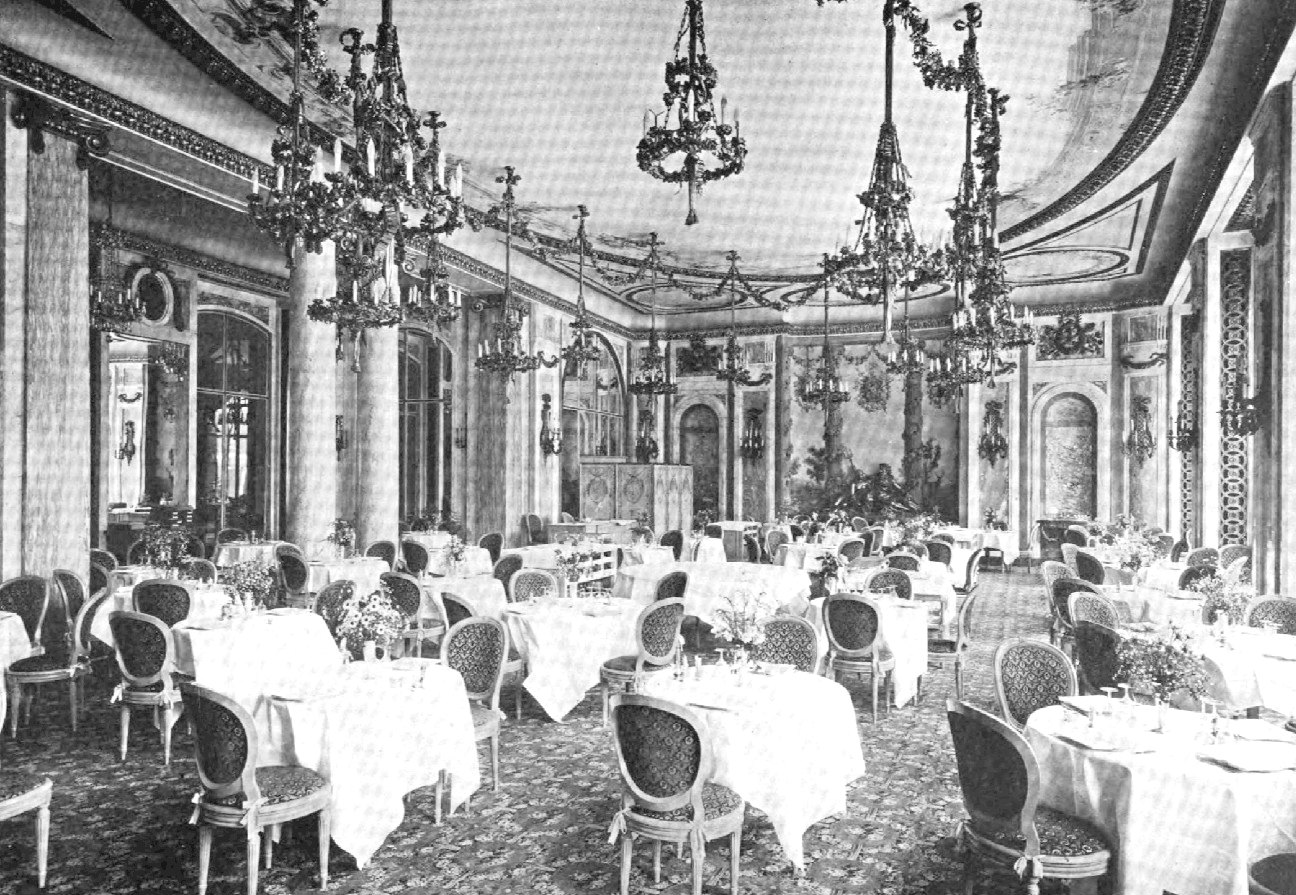
Dining Room at the Ritz

On 4 August 1914, Lady Diana Cooper's future husband, Duff Cooper, then a Foreign Office official, dined at the Ritz with the Earl of Essex and his American wife, Adele Capell (née Grant) and Patrick Shaw-Stewart, and later that day announced that World War I had broken out to the party. Before the war began, the German and Austrian embassies both retained tables at the Ritz Restaurant. The hotel suffered during the war, and lost nearly £50,000 in 1915 alone; the ballroom was usually empty and lights went out by 10pm, but rooms were still in demand and the hoteliers believed it to be worth keeping open. Socialites such as Lady Cynthia Asquith, daughter-in-law of H. H. Asquith and Lord Basil Blackwood were documented in her diaries to have dined at the Ritz in the spring of 1916. The following year, she held a lavish dinner party with the likes of Osbert Sitwell, Gilbert Russell and Maud Julia Augusta Russell and Clare Tennant.

In September 1917, a shell exploded in Green Park in close proximity to the Ritz, and according to Lord Ivor Churchill it broke all of the windows to adjacent Wimbourne House. David Lloyd George held a number of secret meetings at the Ritz during the latter half of the war, organised by Sir Basil Zaharoff, and it was at the Ritz that he made the decision to intervene on behalf of Greece against Turkey. The Duke of Marlborough recorded dining at the Ritz; "I lunched at the Ritz. The whole social world goes there, prices being cheap. All women there from M. Paget to the latest tart." A November 1917 article in the Daily Herald titled "How they starve at the Ritz" detailed the lavish meals on offer despite national food shortages. The story was extensively reprinted in leaflets and some historians believe that it pushed the government into introducing compulsory rationing.

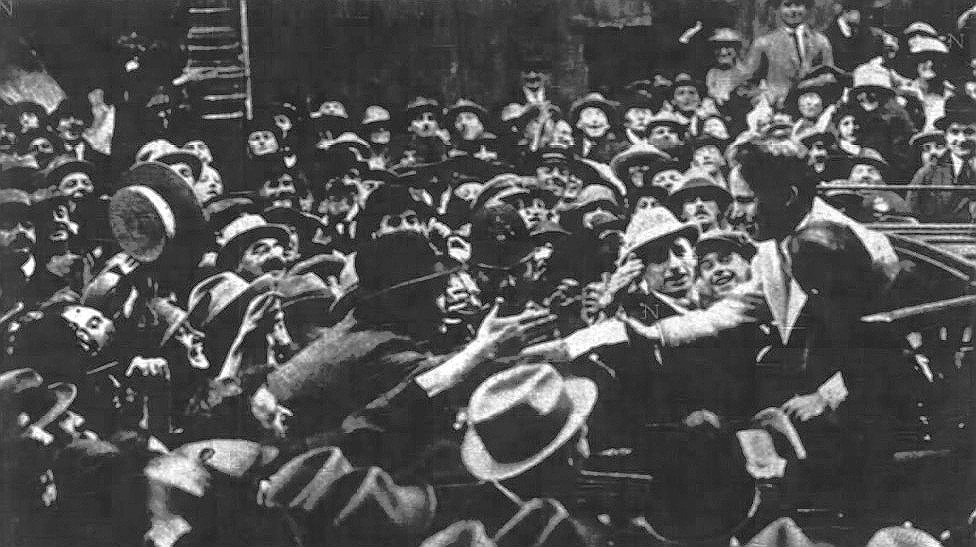
Charlie Chaplin at the Ritz in 1921

When asked to summarise hotels in London in the early 1920s, Barbara Cartland remarked that "The Ritz stood for stuffiness and standards, the Carlton was for businessman, the Savoy was rather fast, some other ones were frankly scandalous, and the Berkeley, where you could dance all night for ten shillings, was for the young". In 1921, Bonvin, the manager of the Ritz, died, and was replaced with J.S. Walters. Walters was a "tireless salesman" in promoting the hotel, especially in mainland Europe, and flaunted the hotel in the Tatler at a time when it was unpopular to do so. Louis Mountbatten, 1st Earl Mountbatten of Burma frequented the Ritz from his time as a Sub-Lieutenant onwards, and when his friend Charlie Chaplin arrived in London in September 1921 after a nine-year absence, great crowds gathered at Waterloo station and Chaplin had to be ushered to the hotel by some 40 policemen. He stayed in the first-floor Regal Suite and was photographed throwing carnations to his fans from the Arlington Street balcony. After the stir Chaplin's stay caused, the Ritz manager vowed to "never again" have film stars as guests at the Ritz.

The Ritz became popular with film stars and executives when staying in London, although the hotel has kept most of the names of many of its luminaries a secret in its records. Douglas Fairbanks was known though to frequent the Ritz in the 1920s, and director Alexander Korda's talent scout held a table at the Ritz in the 1930s. Noël Coward, also a regular diner at the Ritz in the 1920s and 1930s, met with Michael Arlen in the restaurant in 1924 to discuss the urgent problem of generating the funding for his new play, The Vortex. Arlen gave Coward a cheque for $250 without question, and The Vortex would go on to be his first major success. Coward's song, "Children of the Ritz", which featured in the 1932 revue Words and Music was penned while Coward was lunching in the Ritz with Beverley Nichols. Numerous authors began to meet at the Ritz during the same period, and it began to creep into literature itself. In Michael Arlen's 1922 novel Piracy, the hotel was described as a "very stout and solid building in the manner of the old Bastille, originally conceived no doubt with a fearful eye on class prejudice", and R. Firbank had a running gag in his novels about there being "fleas in the Ritz". Later, the hotel appears in Anthony Powell's A Dance to the Music of Time. The narrator Nicholas Jenkins meets poet Mark Members at the Ritz, and the golden nymph in the Palm Court of the hotel is mentioned.

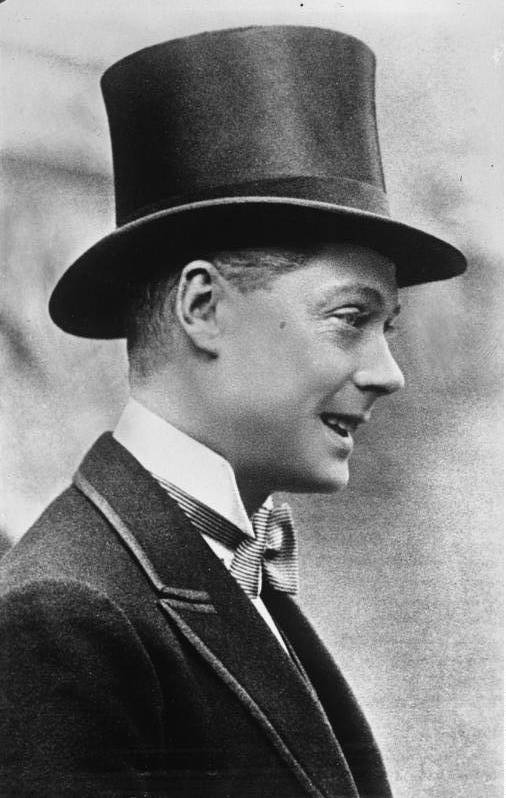
The future Edward VIII, a regular at the hotel in the 1930s, where he practised his dancing skills

"It had a special atmosphere about it and the Palm Court was always filled before luncheon with 'society beauties', debutantes and their boyfriends, and famous actors and actresses—though the latter seldom seemed to actually lunch there. Bejewelled American ladies used to parade up and down the corridor awaiting their guests, The Ritz was more like a club than a hotel; you were bound to see your friends there. To 'meet at the Ritz' was the obvious choice. It had the combination of elegance and cosiness. The Ritz had an essentially happy atmosphere which radiated from the staff. All the waiters knew everybody and became personal friends. The Ritz in those days had a courtesy and elegance unlike any other hotels; it was thought of as 'home' in a sense that never applied to anywhere else".— Sir Michael Duff, 3rd Baronet on life at the Ritz as a young man in the 1930s.

William Brownlow, 3rd Baron Lurgan, who succeeded Henry V Higgins as chairman of the Ritz upon his death in 1928, was especially keen on attracting American guests to the hotel. He was a close friend of the Earl of Carnavon and his American wife Catherine Wendell, and at times the couple were freely given the entire second floor of the hotel to accommodate guests. Upon the death of Lord Lurgan in 1937, Carnavon was told that he had to begin paying for his staying at the hotel, but was given a "slight reduction for old time's sake". Carnarvon later remarked: "The Ritz has been my London home for over fifty years. I'm very fond of the place. Nobody knows it better". In 1931, the Aga Khan was involved with organising the Round Table Conference at the hotel, which was attended by Mahatma Gandhi and many others. On one occasion the Aga Khan took over the Palm Court to hold a meeting with his followers. The Aga Khan maintained a suite at the Ritz for forty years.

In the 1930s, Aletto became the restaurant manager of the Ritz, a "popular and much-mimicked character" according to Montgomery-Massingberd and Watkin. The future Edward VIII and his associates were often seen at the Ritz in the 1930s. In 1932 the Evening Standard observed the Prince performing on the dance floor: "The Prince of Wales never misses an opportunity to raise the stand of his dancing... He danced three tangoes each of which lasted about thirty-five minutes!" In 1934, Edward's brother, the Duke of Kent, married Princess Marina of Greece and Denmark at the Ritz and scaffolding was put up in the garden for the celebration. The Queen Mother would also attend private parties at the Ritz during this period, as did King Boris of Bulgaria and Queen Marie of Romania. At one point, the Ritz hosted four reigning monarchs simultaneously: King Boris, King Farouk of Egypt, Spain's King Alfonso and Queen Wilhelmina of the Netherlands. After the romance of Edward VIII and Wallis Simpson became public knowledge, both parties could be found at separate tables near the restaurant's door, in case a speedy exit was necessary. Edward VIII's abortive coronation celebration was scheduled to be held at the Ritz Hotel. One of those signed to perform was American vocalist Hildegarde, who was one of his favourite performers.

The Ritz suffered from the effects of the General Strike of 1926, subsequently seeing competition from the likes of the Dorchester Hotel and Grosvenor House. The Great Depression brought a sharp decline in business to the hotel, and in the summer of 1931 staff wages were reduced—the chefs, kitchen workers and the directors had a 25% cut in their wages. To increase earnings, in 1935 Fred Cavendish-Bentinck recommended that the hotel commence putting on a Cabaret show. Advertised in the Evening Standard, the programme was an immediate success. In January 1936, Austrian comedian Vic Oliver was one of the entertainers hired to perform at the hotel for two weeks, and Cyril Fletcher appeared in the show for a month the following year. The BBC began broadcasting live performances from the restaurant of the hotel, with pianist Billy Milton and others. It was through the show that the Irving Berlin song "Puttin' On the Ritz" grew in popularity, performed by Joe Kaye's Dance Band. (Note: In his book George of the Ritz, former head porter George Criticos claimed that the song was never played at the Ritz as it was considered to be "vulgar".) In 1937, James Stephens shortly succeeded Lurgan as director of the Ritz before being replaced by Hans Pfyffer von Altishofen, who had been on the board of the Ritz Hotel Development Company from 1910 and was also the chairman of the Paris Ritz.

=== World War II ===
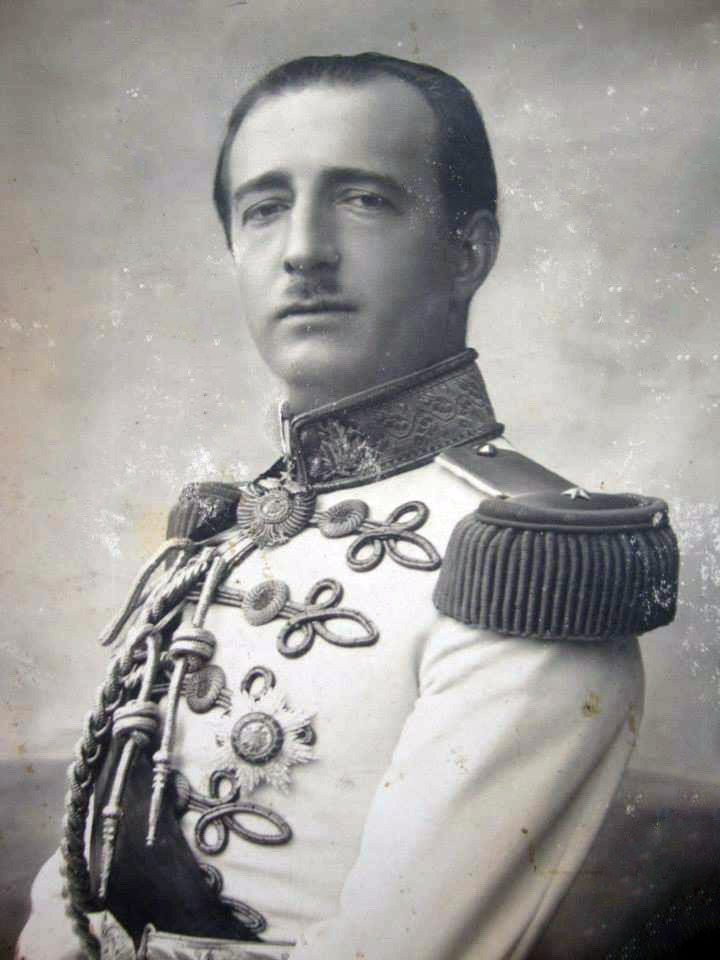
Zog I of Albania lived at the Ritz from 1940 to 1941.

During World War II, the Ritz became integral to political and social life among the elite, and a number of eminent royals, aristocrats and politicians moved into the hotel. Camilla Russell, the wife of writer Christopher Sykes, stated that the Ritz "enjoyed a tremendous vogue during the war and was, even more than ever, much used as a meeting place", and at night was "crowded yet somehow safe". Angela, Countess of Antrim, Syke's sister, remarked that the Ritz was the ideal meeting place for "gathering news of husbands at the wars". Emerald Cunard took up residence in the Ritz for a period, but later moved to the Dorchester.

In the summer of 1940, the Albanian royal family, including King Zog I, Queen Geraldine of Albania, Leka, Crown Prince of Albania, the King's six sisters, two nieces, three nephews and others moved into the hotel and were given their own floor, escorted by a chamberlain, the Albanian diplomats from Paris, and numerous bodyguards. Zog brought the royal gold and jewels with him, which were kept in the storeroom of the Ritz before being deposited in the Bank of England. Due to Zog's concerns about safety during air raids, the ladies' cloakroom was converted into a private shelter for the Albanians. Following an air raid, when a bomb fell between the Ritz and the Berkeley in Piccadilly, shattering glass in the Ritz, most of the Albanian royal family moved to Chelsea, but Zog remained until the spring of 1941 until he was offered Lord Parmoor's house in Buckinghamshire. In total, the Ritz was damaged nine times during bombing raids, and the Restaurant had to be closed twice.

Edvard Beneš entertained guests at a private luncheon at the hotel several times a week during the war years. In 1942, Winston Churchill, Dwight Eisenhower and Charles de Gaulle met in the Marie Antoinette suite of the hotel to discuss operations, Brendan Bracken, who served as an observer and mouthpiece on political society in London, and Anglo-American politician Ronald Tree spent much time at the Ritz, and Tree lived there during the winter of 1940. Laura Long, who would later become Laura Spencer-Churchill, Duchess of Marlborough, the second wife of John Spencer-Churchill, 10th Duke of Marlborough, the architectural writer James Lees-Milne, Harold Acton and writer Norman Douglas were regular diners at the Ritz during wartime.

According to Alastair Forbes and Felix Hope-Nicholson, during World War II, the basement bar at the Ritz was reserved for gay and lesbian guests, while the one upstairs was for heterosexual guests. Hope Nicholson described it as "notoriously queer", and stated that "the Ritz bar became too chic, too popular and above all, too queer for the authorities". Evan Morgan, 2nd Viscount Tredegar, MP Harold Nicolson, Brian Howard, and Pauline Tennant were all regulars at the basement bar.

=== Post-war years ===
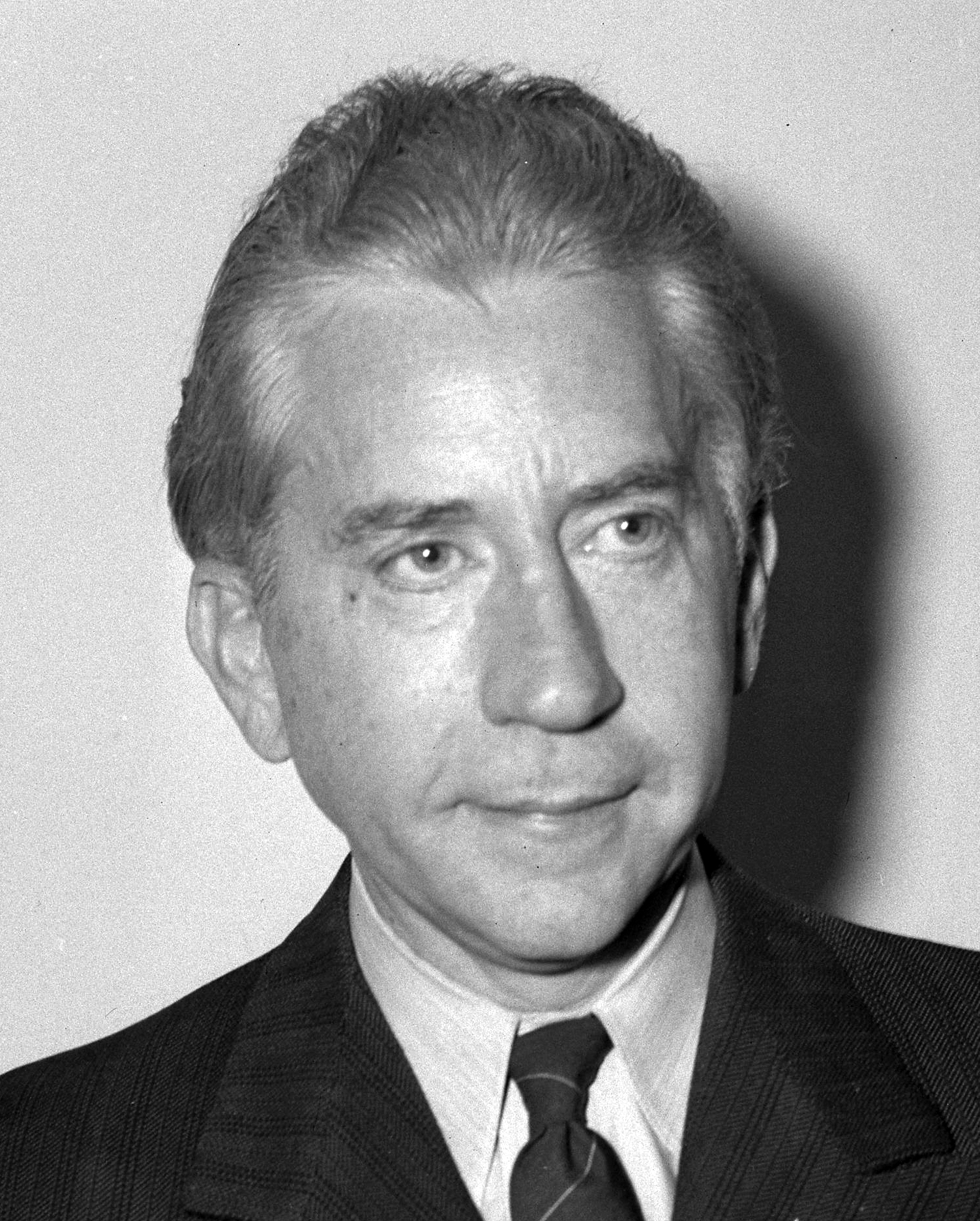
J. Paul Getty, reputedly the richest man in the world at the time, lived at the Ritz after the war.

The hotel was owned for some thirty years by the Bracewell-Smith family, who also had significant stakes in the nearby Park Lane Hotel. Although the family were quick to earn a profit from the hotel, there was a turbulent period in the years after World War II, with a workers strike in 1946, and the restaurant attracting significant criticism in its quality of cuisine. On one occasion, a group of patrons of the Ritz, known as the "Friends of the Ritz", met with Sir Bracewell Smith in Park Lane Hotel to complain about the standards; Smith himself dined at the Ritz and informed them that it was quite satisfactory.

Several suicides also darkened the reputation of the Ritz in the postwar years, including that of horse trainer Peter Beatty from the sixth-floor window in October 1949, and that of French gangster Baron Pierre de Laitre, who strangled love interest Eileen Hill to death in his second-floor room in March 1953 when she refused to marry him, before killing himself by stuffing a silk sock down his throat. (Note: Other news sources say Hill's throat was slashed and that the Baron then strangled himself with his own suspenders tied to a bed post. News accounts describe the Baron as well to do. In 1949, he was said to have chased his bride to be and her father from his castle in Pléchâtel with a rifle the day before the planned marriage. The couple married three months later but divorced within a few months. Hill and de Laitre had registered at the Ritz as man and wife and were staying in Room 223. Hill's father, a policeman, described his daughter as secretive and said he had never heard of Baron de Laitre before. Hill's friends said she met de Laitre about a year before the murder-suicide A note was found when the bodies were discovered in the blood-spattered hotel room, but police did not reveal its contents. French police, upon learning of the event, believed Hill had threatened to jilt de Laitre. French police later said de Laitre operated a hotel and bar in Dinard and that he also operated as a smuggler, using a motor boat to travel between France and Britain. French customs officials were demanding payment of £4,000 from de Laitre just prior to the fatal incident.)

Nonetheless, the Ritz continued to be a social hub for the aristocracy and attract the world's elite in the 1950s. It was very popular with the wealthy family of the Aga Khan, and oil magnate J. Paul Getty, reputedly the richest man in the world at the time, lived at the Ritz after the war. On one occasion a photographer working for Time and Life magazines staged an incident outside the hotel by arranging for the barrowboy to pour coppers onto the pavement as Getty emerged from the hotel and photographed just as he went to pick them up. Shell Oil heiress Olga Deterding lived at hotel for several years, and in one altercation with her lover she threw his trousers out of the window. In 1956 she became tired of the high life and spent a period working at Albert Schweitzer's leper colony in French Equatorial Africa. Film stars Rita Hayworth and Tallulah Bankhead were regular guests at the hotel; Hayworth was married to Prince Aly Khan between 1949 and 1953. Another notable resident of the Ritz during this period was Nubar Gulbenkian, an "expansive extrovert" who kept a permanent suite at the Ritz and made exorbitant demands for luxuries and foods, even if out of season.

In January 1959, Patrice Lumumba, the Prime Minister of Congo, stayed at the hotel and met with Sir Edward Adjaye, the Ghanaian High Commissioner in London and others in the restaurant. The event was picketed by Mosleyites, who in concern with human rights issues in Congo at the time, demonstrated outside of the hotel, displaying banners such as "RAPERS OF CHILDREN – GO HOME" and issuing racial epithets. Adjaye was attacked as he left the hotel, although it has been speculated that he was mistaken for Lumumba.

George Criticos served as head porter of the Ritz for 45 years, retiring in 1960 for health reasons; he had been recommended for a job at the Ritz by Sir Basil Zaharoff. In his 1959 book, George of the Ritz, Criticos remembered some of the notable people and events during his years of service. Criticos once acted as an agent to the Aga Kahn at the racetrack, having been given US$45,000 by the monarch to place bets in his name. He was also asked to take the 18-year-old Prince Aly Khan on a monthlong tour of the United States to help the young man forget a failed romance. When Criticos saw an unshaven man in coveralls entering the hotel, he called out to the man to stop him. When the man turned to face Criticos, he recognised him as King Boris of Bulgaria, who was a railroad buff and was returning from driving a special train. (Note: George Criticos died in London on 17 July 1961; he had been retired from the Ritz for one year at the time of his death.)

=== Later 20th-century history ===
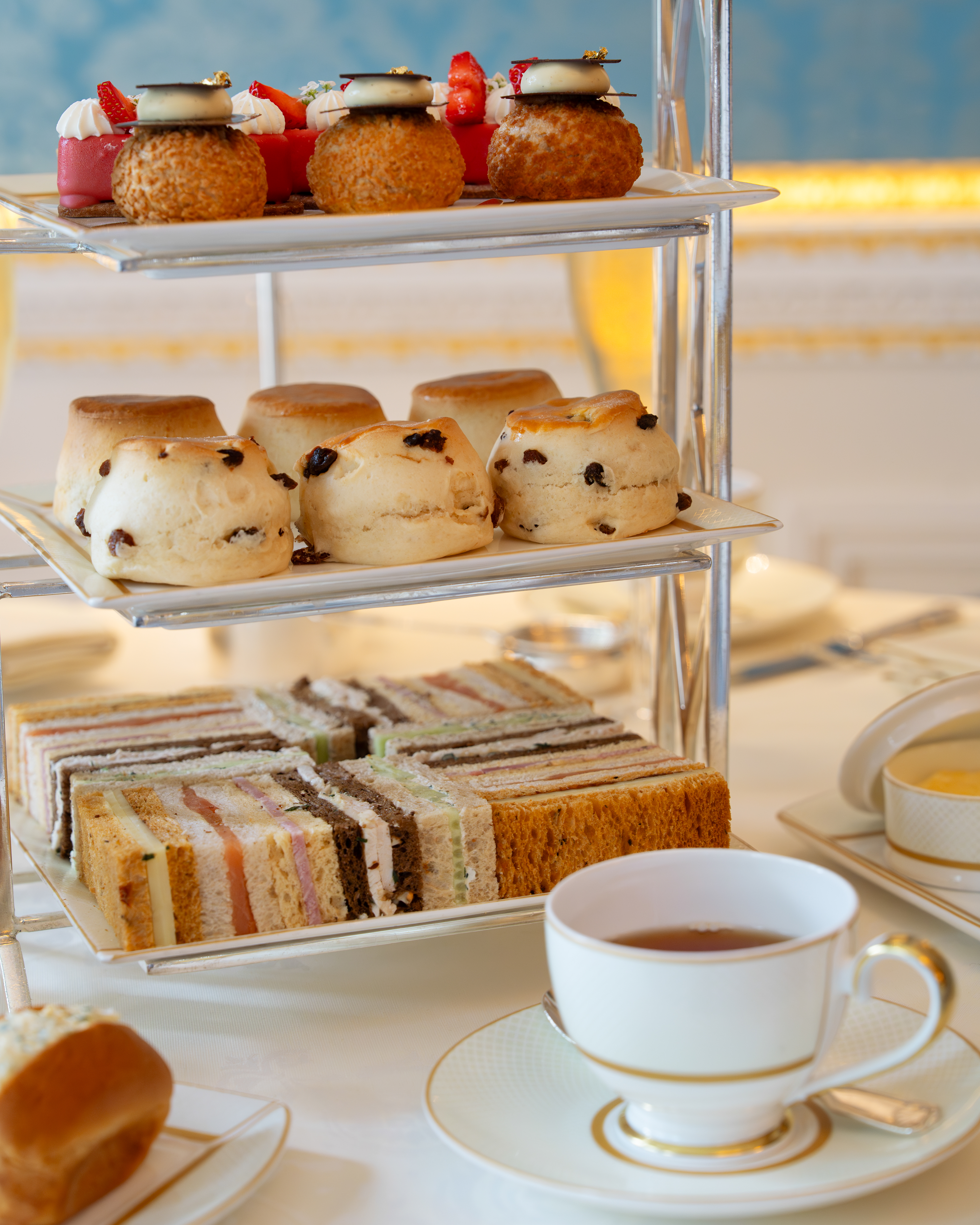
Afternoon Tea at The Ritz

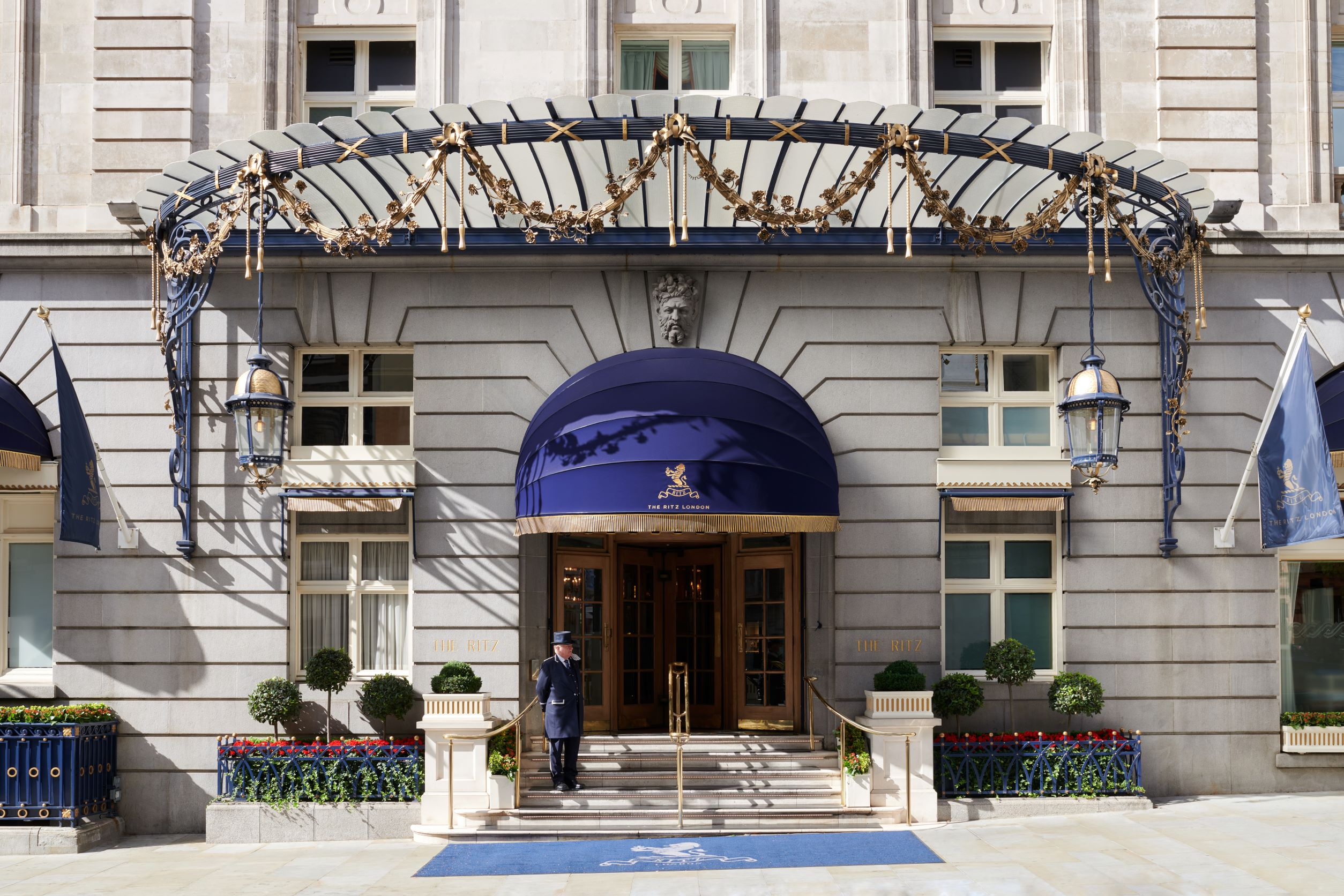
The Ritz London Exterior

The social scene changed dramatically in London in the 1960s, with Beatlemania and the sexual revolution, and British aristocracy in the capital was not what it had been. By this time the general impeccable standards of the Ritz had fallen. Peregrine Worsthorne noted the change: "Precisely that it was not all Ritzy, in the sense of being conspicuously luxurious...the glitter had long since faded and shabbiness set in. The place was usually empty, kept alive by memories of former glories and a clientele who preferred nostalgia to comfort". Yet celebrities often held parties at the hotel, and the Rolling Stones were guests for many years. British Prime Ministers Harold Wilson, Edward Heath and Harold Macmillan often lunched at the Ritz; Heath would always reserve table 29 in the restaurant.

=== Cunard Trafalgar Years ===
In the 1970s, the hotel fell into a turbulent period. Terrorist threats from the Provisional Irish Republican Army became the chief concern, and bomb scares were not uncommon. The oil crisis in the early 1970s directly affected business and prompted the Bracewell-Smith family to sell their stake to Trafalgar House on 5 April 1976 for £2.75 million. At the time of the sale, the hotel's occupancy rate was just 45 per cent; the Ritz Grill Room had been closed and it had lost quite a bit of money in recent times.

Trafalgar had acquired Cunard Line in 1971 and amalgamated the Ritz into its newly established Cunard Trafalgar Hotel division.

In 1984, the Ritz brought back its weekly Sunday tea dances, which had been popular during the 1920s and 1930s. Due to high demand, the hotel considered restricting afternoon tea at the Ritz to hotel guests only, as those staying at the Ritz were often unable to get a table. Many Londoners who would have been barred by this restriction voiced disapproval, and the Ritz compromised by requiring reservations for afternoon tea at the hotel. Proper attire for tea is a must; the Ritz once refused to admit Mick Jagger for tea because he was not wearing a jacket and tie.

By the 1990s, the hotel was marketed as part of Cunard Hotels and Resorts, and featured sail and stay packages in conjunction with the Cunard flagship, Queen Elizabeth 2.

=== The Barclay years ===
In October 1995, David and Frederick Barclay of the Ellerman Group of Companies purchased the hotel for £80 million from Trafalgar House, through their company Ellerman Investments. They spent eight years and £40 million restoring the hotel to its former grandeur, with the help of Parisian interior designer Philippe-Charles Belloir. (Note: Many of the electrical fixtures from the original construction are still in use – both chandeliers and wall sconces.) Prince Charles and Camilla Parker Bowles made their first public appearance together at the Ritz, as they left a birthday party for Parker-Bowles' sister. The couple returned to the hotel in November 2002 for the Prince's birthday party, which was also attended by Queen Elizabeth II and Prince Philip. In 2002, the Ritz became the first hotel to receive the Royal Warrant from the Prince of Wales for banqueting and catering services.

In 2005, the Ritz acquired the adjoining Wimbourne House. On 27 January 2007, around 300 people were evacuated to the nearby May Fair Hotel following a fire alarm in the hotel. No one was hurt in the blaze, which started in the basement casino kitchen's extraction vents. The Ritz casino only suffered "minor damage".

Former British prime minister Margaret Thatcher was convalescing at the Ritz when she died following a stroke on 8 April 2013.

There was criticism in 2012 because the Ritz had not paid any corporation tax since being taken over by the Barclay twins. The accounts indicated that the profitable hotel used a series of tax reliefs to reduce its corporation tax to zero. David Barclay's son, Aidan, stated that the company abided by UK law.

=== The Qatari years ===
In March 2020, the hotel was sold to Abdulhadi Mana Al-Hajri, a Qatari businessman. He is the brother of Al-Anoud Al-Hajri, second wife of the current Emir of Qatar.

In 2023, the Ritz faced allegations of discrimination after a job applicant was told that "Afro-style" hair was not permitted for staff. The Ritz apologised, stating that an out-of-date policy was mistakenly sent to the applicant and reiterated that they did not condone discrimination of any form.

In 2022, the hotel began a £300m renovation which includes a 53-room expansion on Arlington Street, matching the exterior of the original building. It was constructed on the site of an adjacent building, which was purchased and demolished. It also includes the addition of a five-story basement, with a spa and parking garage. Construction work is expected to be completed in 2028.

== Architecture ==
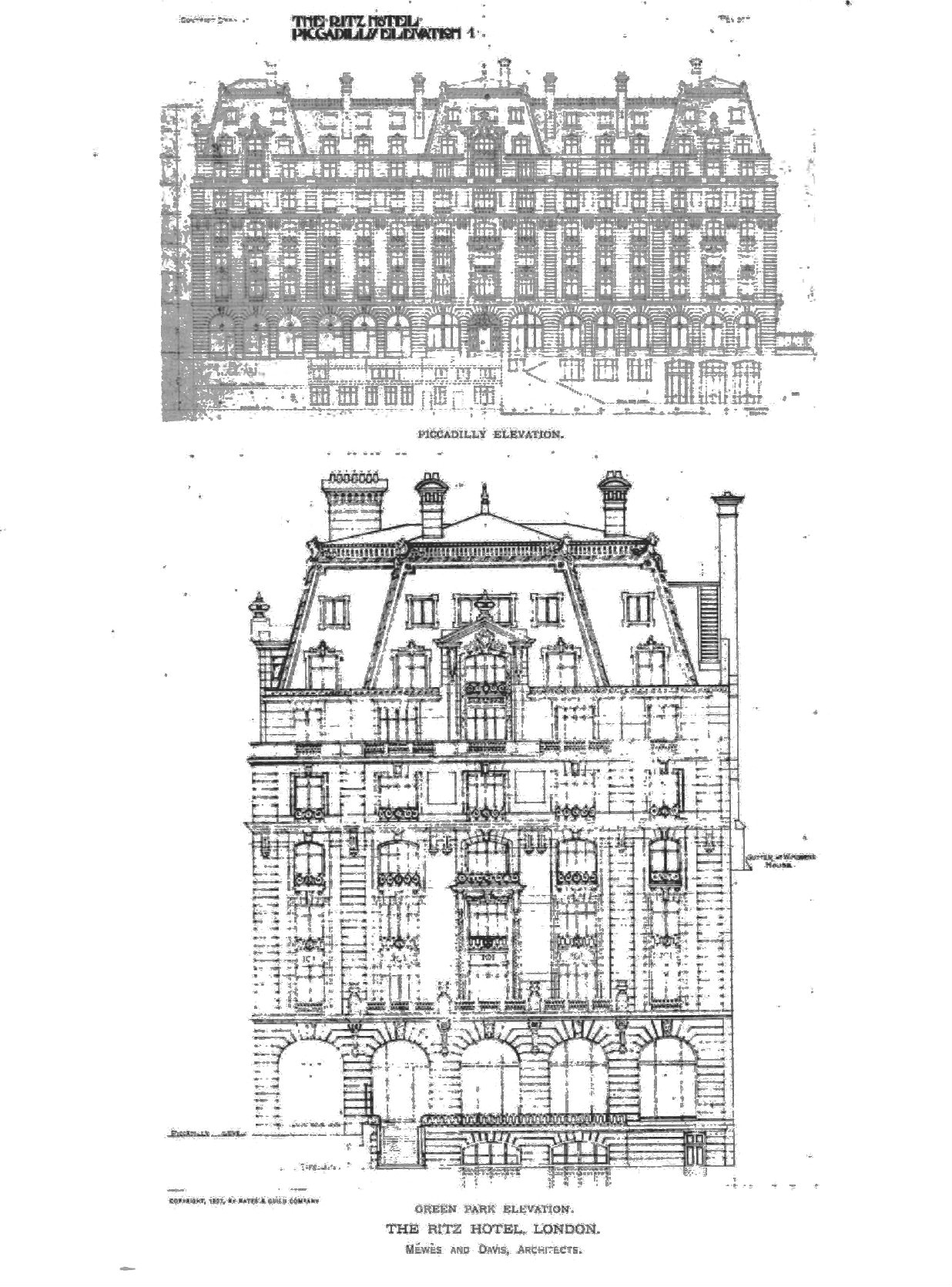
Elevation diagram of the Ritz

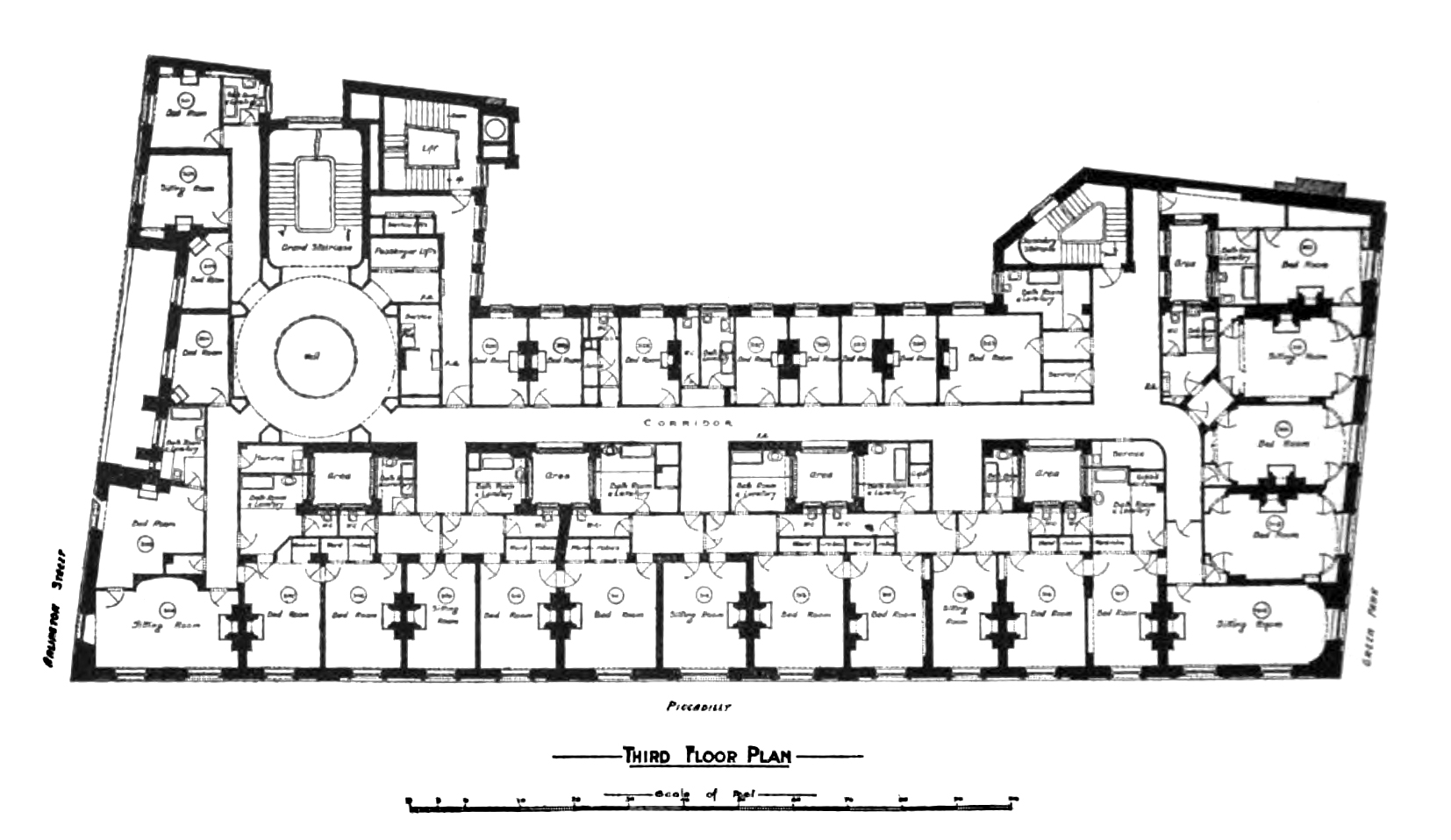
A typical floor plan in the Ritz

Authors Montgomery-Massingberd and Watkin describe the Ritz as "the product of one of those near miraculous convergences of civilised patron and architects and craftsmen of genius working together in complete harmony both with each other and with the social and architectural fashions of the day. The building has been regarded as a masterpiece from the day it was finished." Both of the architects, Charles Mewès and Arthur J. Davis, were educated at the prestigious École des Beaux-Arts in Paris, and the education which they received is clear in the design of the buildings, particularly the Renaissance influence, delivering "an authentic fabric of traditional French classicism". Mewès had previously designed the Hotel Ritz of Paris for Cesar in 1897–1898, after which he met Arthur Davis, and began working together preparing designs for the Grand Petit Palais in the Paris Exhibition of 1900. Both architects worked on the plans for the London Ritz in 1904–5.

According to Montgomery-Massingberd and Watkin the exterior is both structurally and visually Franco-American in influence with little trace of English architecture. For them the exterior "represents an evocative confluence of various Parisian architectural traditions"; the Piccadilly arcade echoes the arcaded ground floor in the Place Vendrome and the Rue de Rivoli, the steep mansarded skyline on the Green Park facade echoes Hector Lefuel's work on the Pavillon de Flore of the Louvre, while the tall windows and wall panels of the facades resemble those of Mewès's earlier work on a smaller building made as a home for Jules Ferry on Rue Bayard.

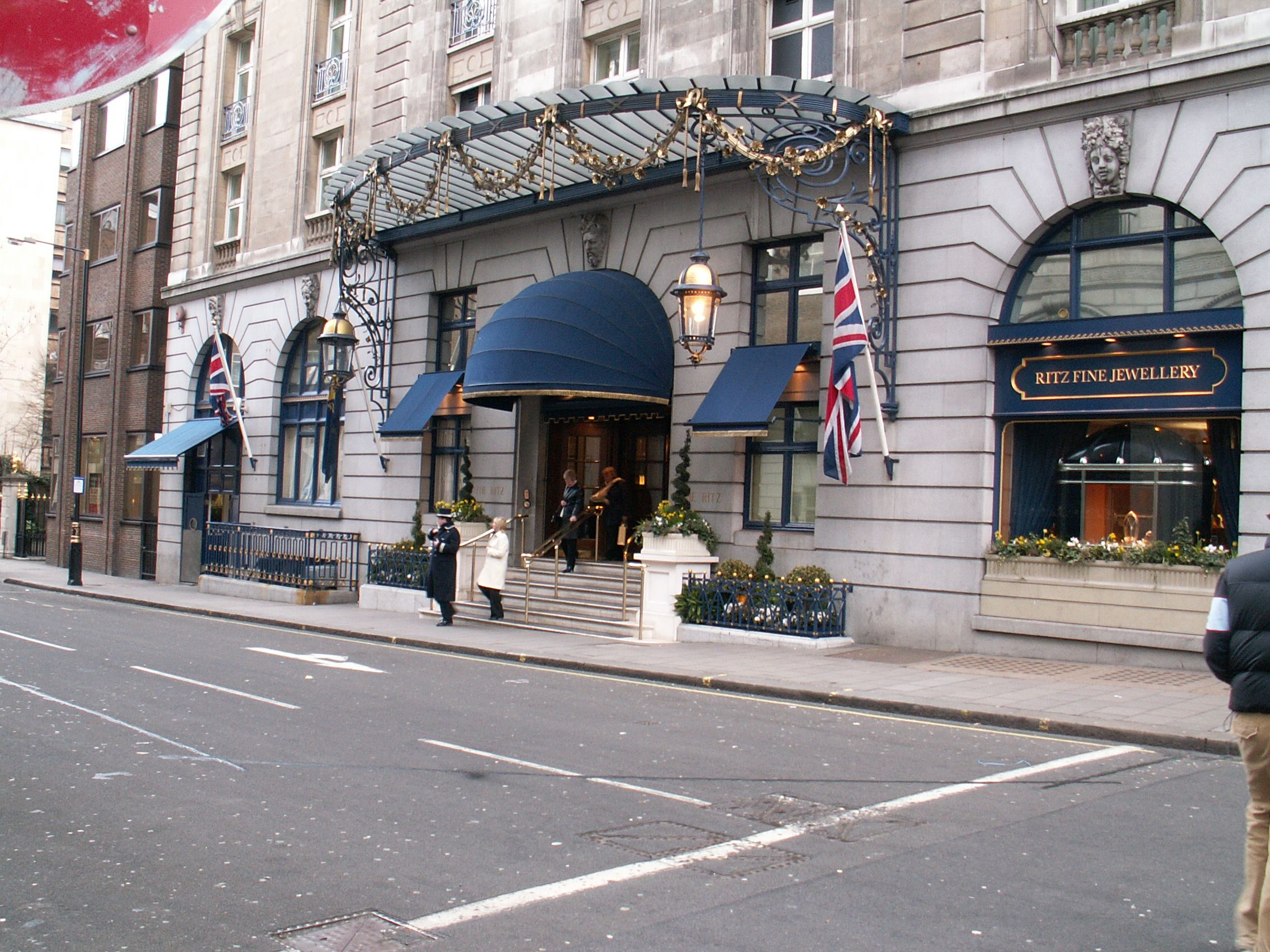
The front of the London Ritz

Excavation for the hotel began by contractors Waring White Building Co. Ltd in June 1904, and it was completed by 1 October 1905, and opened the following May. The building progress was documented each month by The Builder's Journal and Architectural Engineer, and in one edition noted the difficulties of some of the aspects of construction such as hoisting 20-ton 39 feet (12 m) steel joists in a narrow building site. The Architect and Contract Reporter noted that the limited space did not allow for the storage of materials on site. All mortar had to be mixed in the basement and the stone was dressed "on a platform with a watertight roof over the footway". The red-brick foundations of the earlier Walsingham House had to be blasted away to facilitate the foundations of the steel structure in concrete. (Note: The Walsingham House hotel formerly occupied the site of the Ritz.)

The total estimated cost was £345,227. 8s. 1d., with £102,000 going to Messrs Waring and Gillow, £49,000 to French decorators and over £15,000 to the English decorators. John P. Bishop and the Swedish-born Sven Bylander were consultant engineers during the building phase.

The facade on the Piccadilly side is roughly 231 feet (70 m), 115 feet (35 m) on the Arlington Street side, and 87 feet (27 m) on the Green Park side. The irregularity of the site presented initial problems for the builders. Davis dealt with this by "brilliant perspective effects" according to Binney, using curving walls to "cleverly conceal the rapidly diminishing space at the back of the hotel". The purpose of the arcaded front was to provide more space for the bedrooms above. Expensive Norwegian granite is the material on the ground floor, with Portland stone above it.

The steel frame of the building was made in Germany and is based on a model made in the early 1880s in Chicago to increase fire resistance. (Note: English building laws of the time required that the exterior street level walls had to be 39 inches thick.) It was erected by Messrs Potts & Co. of Oxford Street. Fireproofing of the walls was conducted by the Columbian Fireproofing Company Ltd. of Pittsburgh and London, with steel-ribbed bars allowing for ventilation, while remaining soundproof and free from vibration. The internal walls consist of "hollow, porous, terra-cotta blocks" covered with plaster, and the flooring was also made fireproof. At the corners of the pavilion roofs of the Ritz are large green copper lions, the emblem of the hotel.

=== Interior ===
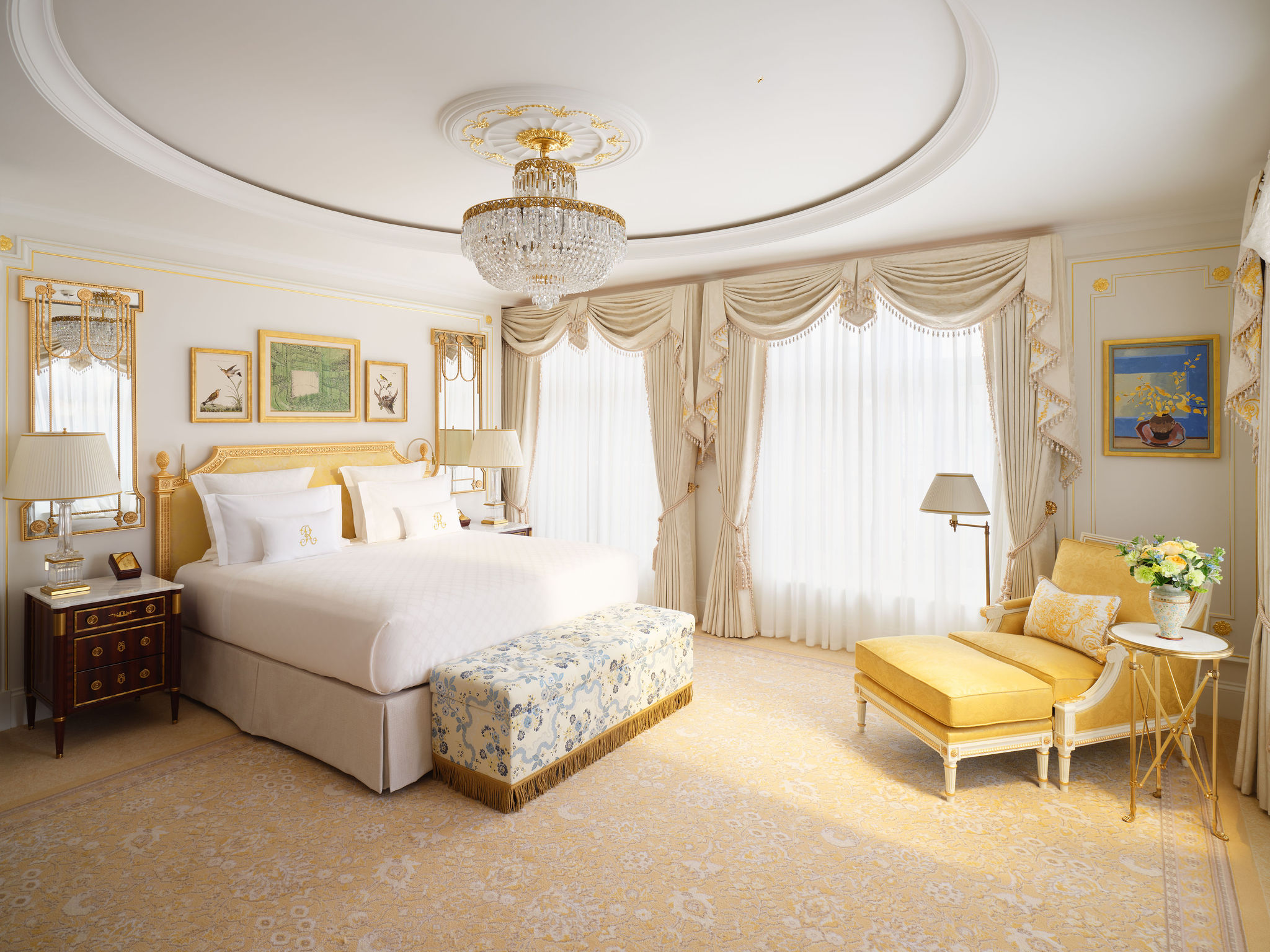
A Grand Deluxe Room at The Ritz

The hotel was designed mainly by London and Paris based designers in the Louis XVI style, which is consistent throughout, giving the hotel its "special atmosphere of perfect appropriateness and elegant restraint". Marcus Binney describes the great suite of ground-floor rooms as "one of the all-time masterpieces of hotel architecture" and compares it to a royal palace with its "grand vistas, lofty proportions and sparkling chandeliers". Waring & Gallow were responsible for many of the fine design work of the past interiors. The ground floor plan dated to 1906 illustrated a large main restaurant overlooking the terrace and garden, a large central Grand Gallery and Winter Garden, a circular vestibule beyond the reception room, the Marie Antoinette Suite near the restaurant, and numerous shops.

The Grill Room had its own entrance on the right side of the entrance doors on Piccadilly, with a staircase leading down. The Grill Room was on the eastern side, and the Banqueting Hall lay at the western end, beneath the restaurant. Today this is home to the Ritz Club. A wide vaulted corridor, the Long Gallery, runs from the Arlington Street entrance on the east side to the restaurant on the west side, with finely woven Savonnerie carpets. Along it are several intricate horseshoe archways. A triangular-shaped staircase features in the building's southwest corner. The curving main staircase was built to allow women to make a "dramatic entrance and show off their gowns to best effect".

==== The Palm Court ====
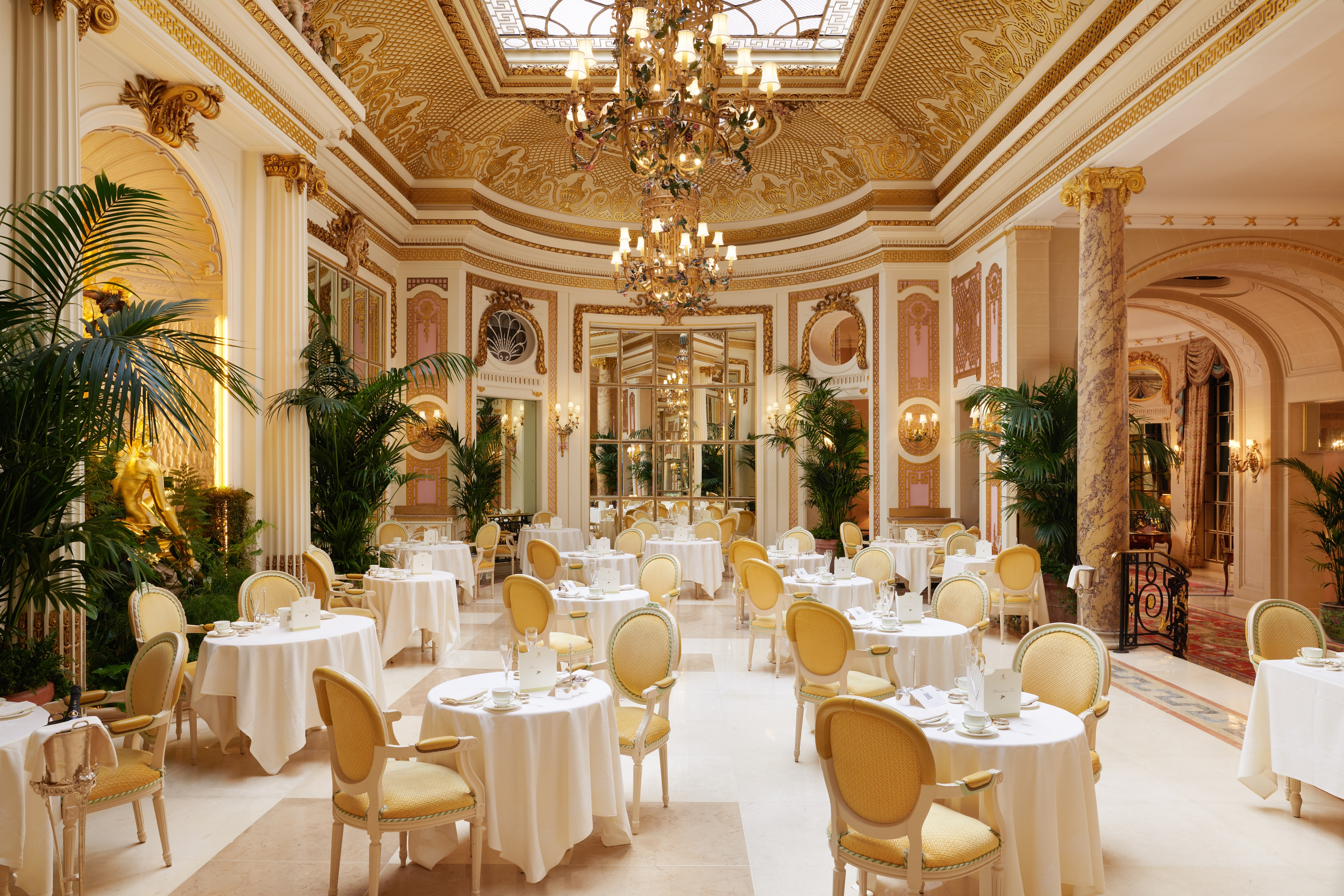
The Palm Court at The Ritz

The Ritz's most widely known facility was the Palm Court, an opulently decorated cream-coloured Louis XVI setting. It was decorated with lavish furnishings, including gilded Louis XVI armchairs with oval backs, which the architects had designed based on research into French neo-classical furniture design of the 1760s and 1770s, which were made by Waring and Gillow. The room, with its, "panelled mirrors of bevelled glass in gilt bronze frames" and "high coving ornamented with gilded trellis-work", according to Montgomery-Massingberd and Watkin "epitomized the elegantly frivolous comfort of Edwardian high life".

There were originally large windows at either end of the court, then known as the Winter Garden, and were replaced with twenty panels of mirrors after 1972. The fountain of the court, known as "La Source", was made of Echaillon marble and is extravagantly sculpted. A nymph, gold in colour, was featured in a lair. A wrought-iron and glass roof of the Palm Court contains two gilded wrought-iron lanterns, and the ceiling contains lion skin motifs.The room was done in soft apricot and had remained so since 1906. César Ritz chose the colour to flatter the complexions of women after weeks of experimentation with various hues.

The Palm Court was the setting for the world-famous institution that is "Tea at the Ritz", (Note: Strictly speaking, Tea at the Savoy is the original version.) once frequented by King Edward VII, Sir Winston Churchill, Judy Garland, Evelyn Waugh and Queen Elizabeth, the Queen Mother. It acquired its reputation as "the place for tea" in London after World War I. In the 1920s a small orchestra would play regularly on the court; film producer John Sutro for instance recalled that Hermione Baddeley once requested the violinist to "play something hot". Between the Winter Garden and the central Grand Gallery is a screen featuring two Ionic columns.

==== Dining ====
The Ritz Restaurant

Marcus Binney has stated that the original main restaurant is "not only one of the most beautiful interiors in London, it can be claimed as the most beautiful restaurant in the world". César Ritz once commented that the room was so heavily designed in bronze that it was fortunate that the hotel was built from steel, or the "walls would collapse with the weight of all that bronze". Flanking the entrance to the main restaurant are two life-sized figures set in "bronze vert after Clodion, holding gilded bronze lustres with six lights each, mounted on pedestals of polished Echaillon marble ornamented with bronze". The restaurant and adjacent guest room were designed by P. H. Remon and Sons of Paris. The ceiling is a described by Montgomery-Massingberd and Watkin as a "painted trompe-l'oeil ceiling on which pinkish clouds drift across the blue sky encircled by a garlanded balustrade". Bronze chandeliers are also a feature, influenced by an 18th-century Augustin de Saint-Aubin engraving known as Le Bal Pare et Masque, and Le Festin by Moreau le Jeune, which was given by the City of Paris to the King and Queen on 21 January 1782.

On the northern end against the Piccadilly arcade were floor-to-ceiling mirrors, divided into panes, which gave the room a spacious effect, especially when the lights were on all day during the winter. At the south end of the restaurant was a watercolour by Davis and gilded figures known as "The Thames and the Ocean", with a buffet made from Norwegian pink marble below it, believed to be inspired by Louis Seize's "Buffet of Mansart". During the 1977 major renovation of the hotel, the scaffolding used in the project was hidden by a clean cloth during mealtimes in the Louis XVI restaurant so as not to upset diners with a possibly disturbing sight.

During the renovation, the columns in the hotel's lobbies were stripped of many coats of cream-coloured paint to display their original pink marble. Most of the work done in the renovation was done to restore and clean while keeping the original 1906 colour scheme. Much of the furniture from the original opening was still in use; new items were faithful copies styled after the originals. The hotel retained its nightstand call buttons for maid, waiter, valet and servant, refusing to make its patrons dial a telephone for services.

From its inception, the kitchen was run mainly by French chefs, and it had a specialist in Russian soups and Viennese pastry; its cakes became so famous that King Edward made regular orders from Buckingham Palace. M. Malley, who had been saucier at the Paris Ritz was appointed Chef des Cuisines, and invented dishes such as Saumon Marquise de Sevignre (Salmon with a crayfish mousse), Filet de Sole Romanoff (served with mussels, small slices of apple and artichokes), and Poulet en Chaudfroid (chicken accompanied by a curry-flavoured pinkish mousse) at the hotel.

The hotel had six private dining rooms, the Marie Antoinette Suite, with its boiserie, and the rooms within the Grade II* listed William Kent House. The Rivoli Bar, built in the Art Deco style, was designed in 2001 by interior designer Tessa Kennedy, to look like a bar on the Orient Express. The lounge was decorated by Marcel Boulanger in the Louis VIV style, the clubroom was by Lenygon and Morant, who were influenced by the Palladian design of Cumberland House in Brettingham, and other rooms were decorated with clear William Chambers and Robert Adam influences. Meals can be served on Nanking china in the Trafalgar Suite. The banquet and catering services received a Royal warrant from the Prince of Wales in 2005. It now has been awarded the same accolade from Charles III.

The Ritz Restaurant was awarded one Michelin star in the 2016 Michelin Guide and received its second star in the 2025 guide. In 2025, the Two Michelin-starred Ritz Restaurant was awarded' Restaurant of the Year' by The National Restaurant Awards 2025.

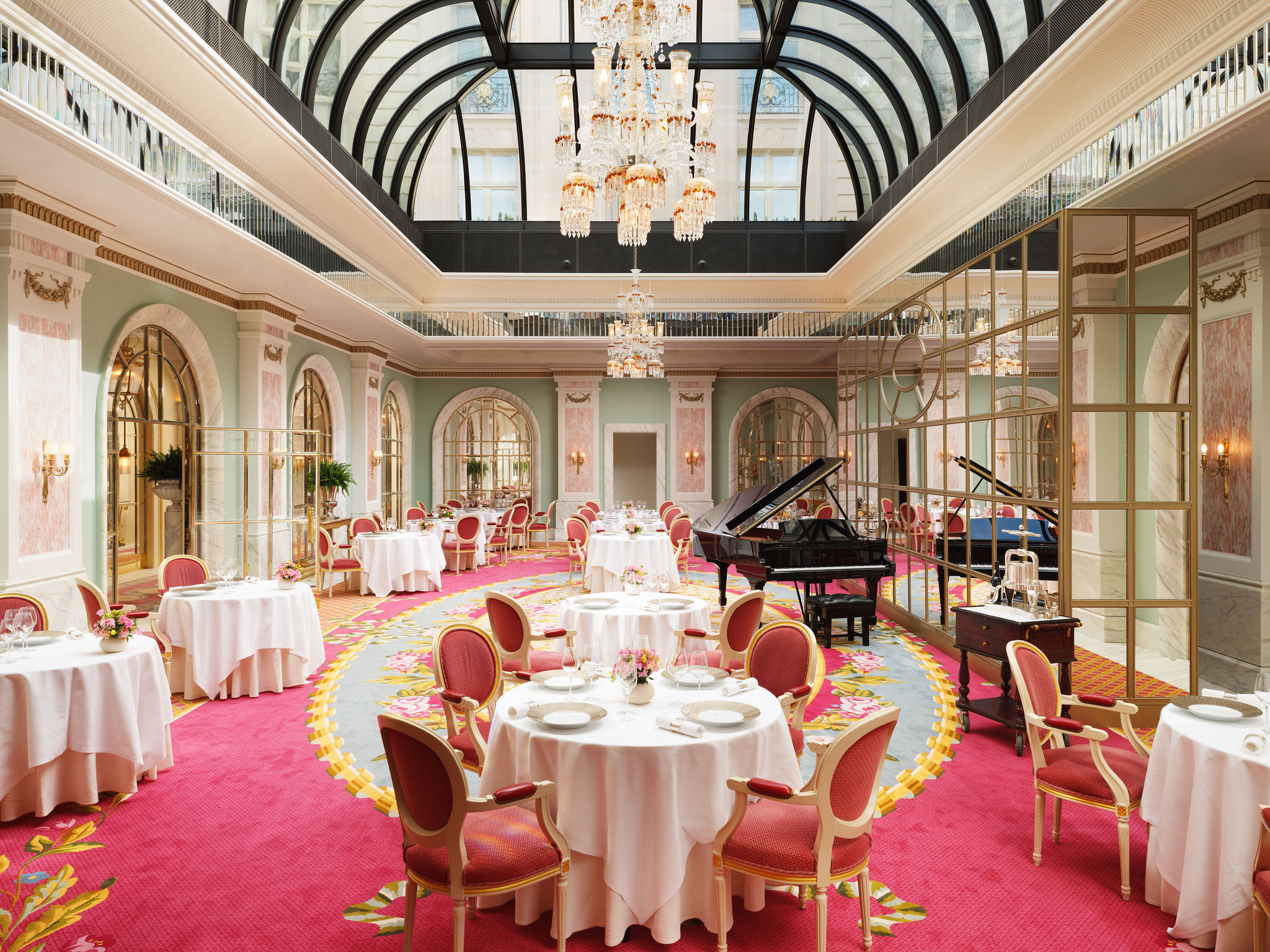
The Ritz Restaurant in 2026

The Ritz Restaurant's temporary location from May 2026, while the historic restaurant space is refurbished, has a grand glass roof atrium and mirrored walls.

==== Marie Antoinette Suite ====
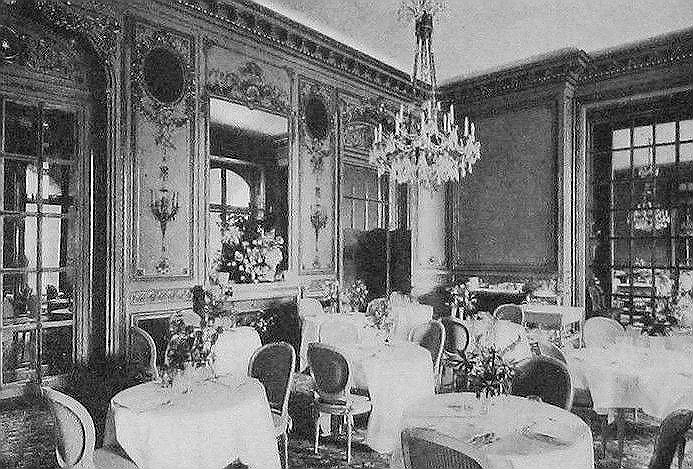
The Marie Antoinette Suite in 1914

The Marie Antoinette Suite was accessed from the main restaurant and is temporarily closed from January 2023. According to Marcus Binney "the gilded detail of the room has the lustre and crispness of gilt bronze, even the egg-and-dart in the boldly modelled cornice". Floral motifs are a common feature of the room, given the namesake, Marie Antoinette, and represents the flowers at one of her feasts. Over the overmantel is a basket of flowers, with "flowers spilling out over the frames of the oval lunettes".

In the small entrance lobby of the suite are two terracotta statues of Spring and Summer, with "drum-shaped pedestals ornamented with gilt-bronze flowers and ribbons". The ventilation grilles, of considerable size, are decorated in bronzed lattice. On the walls are a series lamp holders held by miniature Apollo lyres, with each bulb holder containing around 25 leaves opened out. The lights, according to Binney, are hung on "cords from ribbons tied in bows, entwined at intervals with flowers, descending to a cluster of tassels". The panels of the walls are treated like picture frames, with inner and outer mouldings, in contrast to the window frames and the wall mirrors which are surrounded by "clusters of reeds, with an inset behind which a curtain could hang without obscuring the moulding", according to Binney.

==== Rooms and suites ====
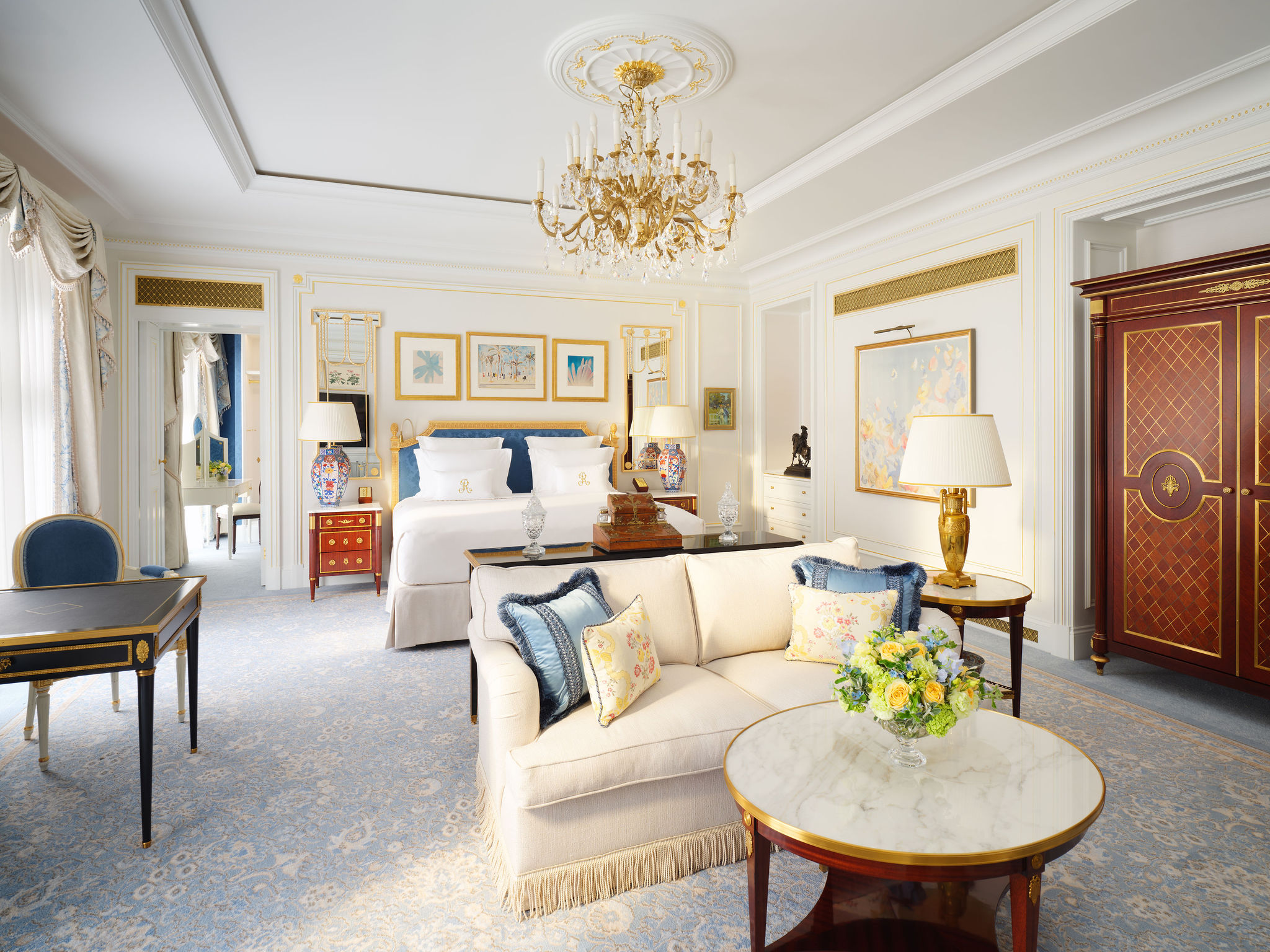
A Junior Suite at The Ritz

The main bedrooms are divided into two principal categories: Deluxe Rooms and Grand Deluxe Rooms. Queen/King/Twin, The suites are divided into Junior Suite and Signature Suites.

==== William Kent House ====
William Kent House, also known as Wimbourne House, was opened as an extension of The Ritz. The house has been converted into a complete function area with the Music Room, the Burlington Room, the Queen Elizabeth Room and the William Kent room. It also accommodates three of the Ritz' top suites: The Arlington Suite, the Royal Suite as well as the Prince of Wales Suite. Several of the rooms have Louis XVI chimneypieces. The Grade II building was carefully restored and given a modern touch with period furnishings concealing things like flat screen televisions. The interior design was entrusted to interior designer Philippe-Charles Belloir, who also worked for several years on the Ritz Hotel in Paris. The restoration won a Royal Institute of British Architects national gold medal in 2007.

=== The Ritz Club ===
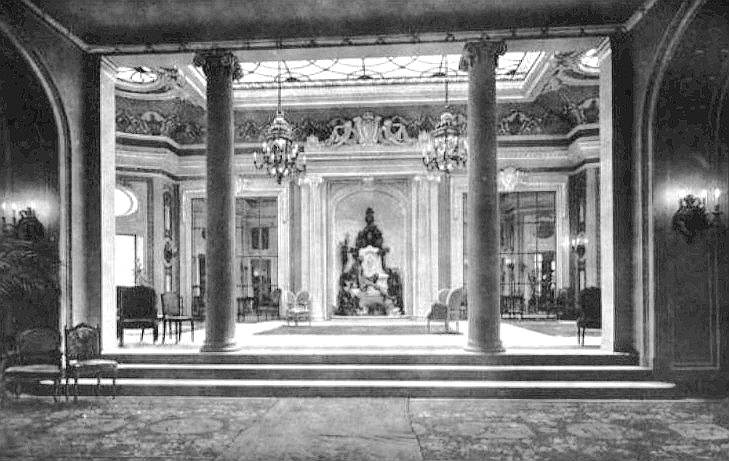
The original Ritz ballroom in 1906

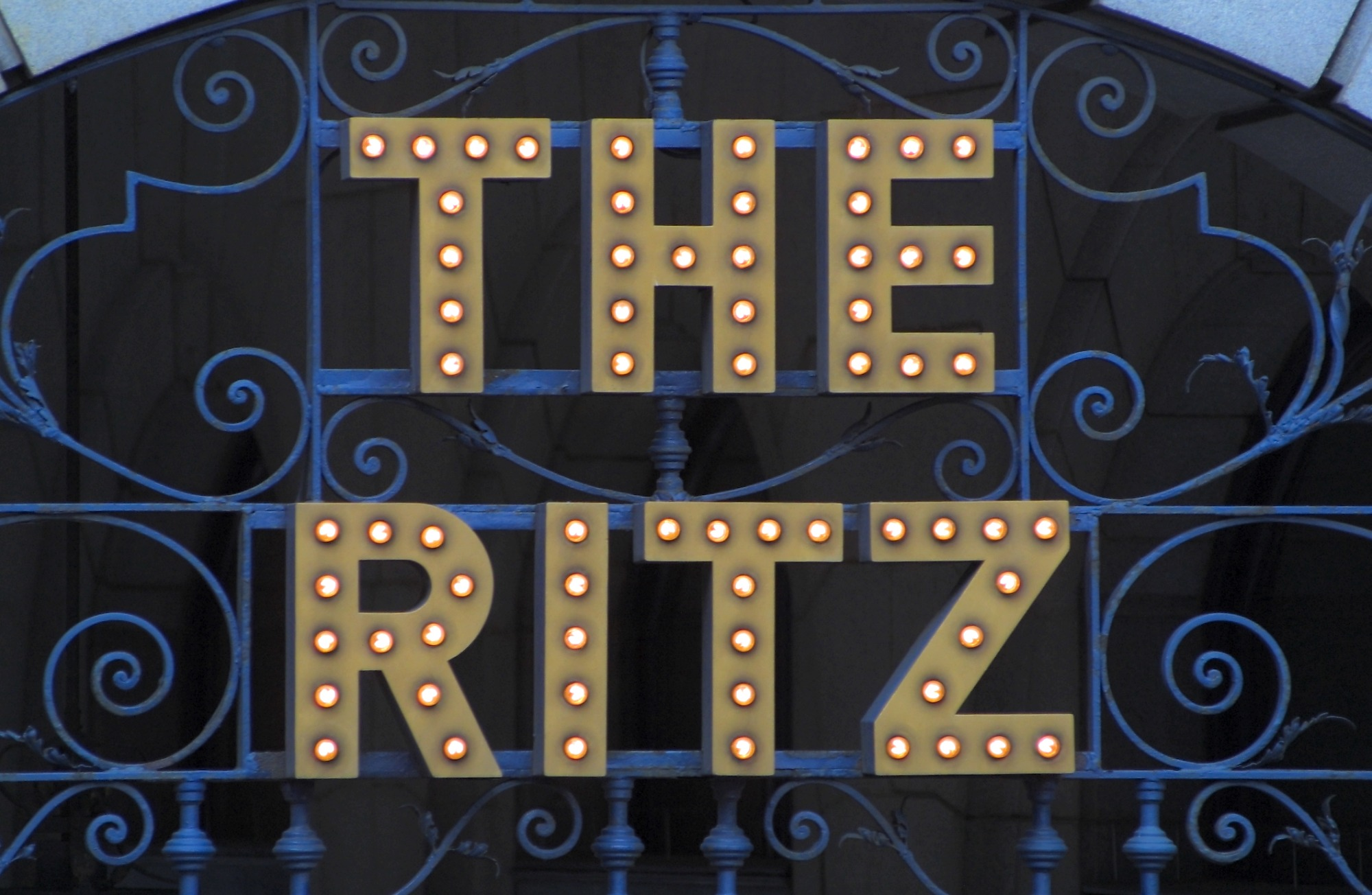
Sign above the western entrance to the arcade

The Ritz Club was a casino in the basement of the hotel, occupying the space which was formerly the Ritz Bar and Grill. In the original structure, this was where the Ritz ballroom was located. A May 1906 edition of Truth magazine described the basement with the Grill Room and Banqueting Hall as palatial, ivory-white in decor, with "mirrors on all the walls reflecting an endless intersection of arched ceilings". The rooms were used for dinners, balls and theatrical shows, with a stage at the south end of the Banqueting Hall. By the mid-1920s the Grill Room had been relocated into the Banqueting Hall, and furnished with circular tables with oval back wicker chairs. One 1926 brochure stated that it was the scene of "some of the finest private and public balls ever given in London".

During World War II, it became known as the nightclub La Popote. The interior of the club was made to simulate a combat dugout complete with sandbags. The club's chandeliers were made out of various types of empty liquor bottles with candles in their necks for light. The dance floor was crowded during wartime, but it later declined in popularity. Laurie Ross was in charge of the Ritz Bar and Grill for many years. The bar, known to its regulars as "Laurie's Bar", closed when Ross retired in 1976. By the 1970s, the basement rooms were closed to the public.

In 1977, Trafalgar House agreed to lease the basement to Mecca Sportsman and Pleasurama, and the Ritz Club was opened the following year, under separate management from the hotel. The basement was restored in the hotel's Louis XVI style of 1906, and the decorations included 6,000 sheets of gold leaf. Gold leaf was not spared on mouldings, cupids and garlands and a blue sky with fluffy clouds painted on the ceiling above the gaming tables. The restoration consisted of repainting, cleaning and recovering all in the original colour scheme. Furniture was restored to its original state and replicas replaced what could not be restored. Stephen Pulman was appointed Head Chef, after being recruited from the exclusive London members' club and restaurant Annabel's. When it opened, the Ritz Club was open to members and hotel guests only. However, unlike most casinos, it charged a fee to enter. The games were considered "high stakes" in that the minimum bet was usually very high. They offered roulette, black jack, baccarat, and poker, as well as some slot machines.

In 1998, the club was purchased by London Clubs, who moved their premises from the Devonshire Club on St James's Street to the basement of the Ritz. A new company was formed in June 1998, the Ritz Hotel Casino Ltd., which was granted legal permission to open a casino. After a quick refurbishment, it reopened in September with exclusive membership, although members were permitted to invite a guest. In 2006, the club was divided into four main areas—the restaurant, bar, lounge and the private gaming room, situated in the former Banqueting Hall. The casino ceased operations in May 2020, following a government-enforced closure under COVID-19 lockdown restrictions.

== In popular culture ==
Evelyn Waugh's 1942 novel Work Suspended features a scene at the Ritz in which the narrator falls in love with a friend's wife during a luncheon. Alan Bennett's allegorical play, Forty Years On was later set in the basement of the Ritz during the war. In the universe of the book Good Omens, two primary characters, the angel Aziraphale and the demon Crowley, often frequent the Ritz. The hotel is mentioned in the song "A Nightingale Sang in Berkeley Square" ("There were angels dining at the Ritz") as well as in Queen's "Good Old Fashioned Lover Boy". A fictionalized version of the Ritz is frequently visited by the characters in the podcast My Dad Wrote a Porno, most notably in Season 2 Episode 1 ("Ritz Spa Gossip") and Season 4 Episode 5 ("Turkey Sandwich?").

The hotel is the source of the word "ritz" and the expression "to put on the Ritz" (meaning to act or dress in an opulent, extravagant matter), the latter of which inspired the Irving Berlin song "Puttin' on the Ritz". Large portions of the 1999 romantic comedy Notting Hill were filmed in and around the hotel.

=== Trademark ===
In recent years the Ritz has taken measures to enforce their trademark against infringement. Lawyers have notified competitors using the name to surrender their websites and Facebook accounts marketing under the trademark, even though they had been using these names for many years. The Desborough Ritz, which had been using the name since the 1930s, changed its name in 2012 after being advised by solicitors to do so. That same year, a Northamptonshire wedding location named The Ritz changed its name to the Banqueting & Conference Suites at the Kettering Ritz after another notification. The Brighouse Ritz in West Yorkshire, which has operated under the name since 1938, was notified in 2017 to change its name or face legal action.

== See also ==
- Hôtel Ritz Paris
- Palm court
- The Leading Hotels of the World
