= Brettingham =

Brettingham is a surname. Notable people with the surname include:

- Matthew Brettingham (1699–1769), English architect
- Matthew Brettingham the Younger (1725–1803), English architect
- Robert Furze Brettingham (1750–1806), English architect

== See also ==
- Brittingham (disambiguation)
