= Puttin' On the Ritz =

1929 song by Irving Berlin

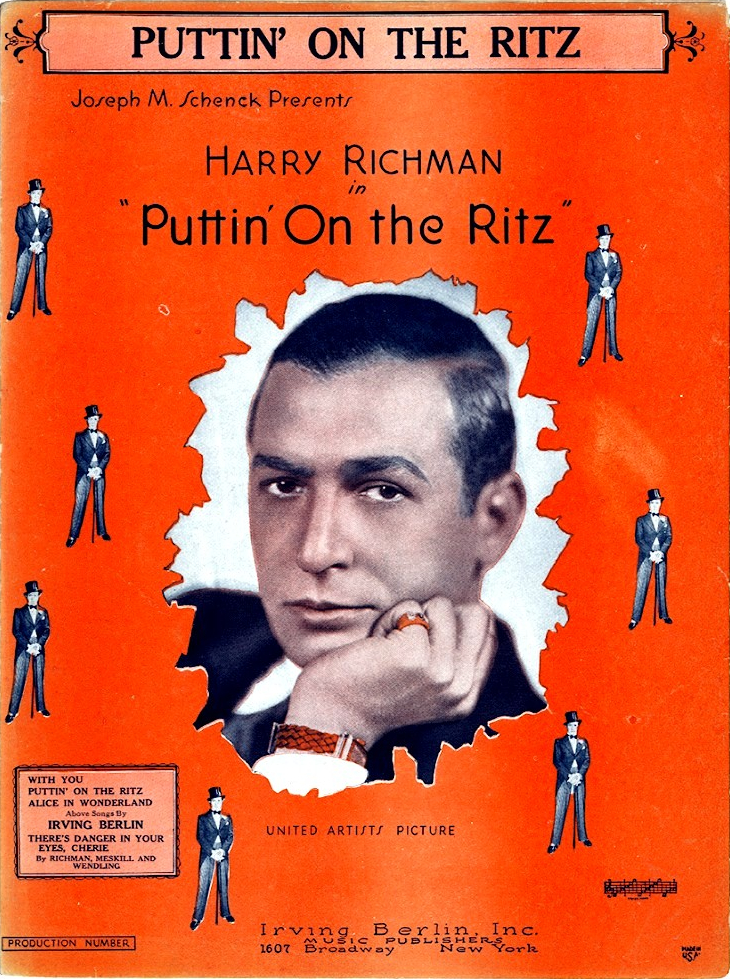
- US sheet music (c. 1930)

Song
- Released: December 2, 1929
- Songwriter: Irving Berlin

"Puttin' On the Ritz" is a song written by Irving Berlin. He wrote it in May 1927 and first published it on December 2, 1929. It was registered as an unpublished song on August 24, 1927, and again on July 27, 1928. It was introduced by Harry Richman and chorus in the musical film Puttin' On the Ritz (1930). According to The Complete Lyrics of Irving Berlin, this was the first song in a film to be sung by an interracial ensemble. The title derives from the slang expression "to put on the Ritz", meaning to dress very fashionably, inspired by the opulent Ritz Hotel in London.

Hit phonograph records of the tune in its original period of popularity of 1929–1930 were recorded by Richman and by Fred Astaire, with whom the song is particularly associated. Every other record label had its own version of this popular song (Columbia, Brunswick, Victor, and all of the dime store labels). Richman's Brunswick version of the song became the number-one-selling record in America.

The song received renewed popularity in 1974 when it was performed by Gene Wilder and Peter Boyle in the film Young Frankenstein. Their version of "Puttin' On the Ritz" was ranked 84th in the American Film Institute's 2004 list, 100 Years...100 Songs. In 1982, Dutch singer Taco recorded and released a synth-pop rendition of the song. Accompanied by a music video that aired on MTV and other music video networks, Taco's cover became a Top 10 hit in the United States, Canada, and much of Europe. Kenny Yarbrough also recorded a cover of the song; this version was used as theme music for the short-lived 1991 sitcom Top of the Heap. In June 2026, CBS News included the song in its list of the 250 essential American songs of the past 250 years.

== Musical structure ==
The song is in AABA form, with a verse. According to John Mueller, the central device in the A section is the "use of delayed rhythmic resolution: a staggering, off-balance passage, emphasized by the unorthodox stresses in the lyric, suddenly resolves satisfyingly on a held note, followed by the forceful assertion of the title phrase". The marchlike B section, which is only barely syncopated, acts as a contrast to the previous rhythmic complexities. Alec Wilder, in his study of American popular song, stated that the song's rhythmic pattern is "the most complex and provocative I have ever come upon".

== Lyrics ==
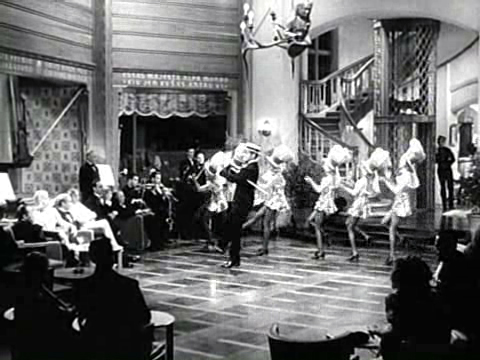
Clark Gable performs "Puttin' On the Ritz" in Idiot's Delight (1939)

In the United Kingdom, the song was popularized through the BBC's radio broadcasts of Joe Kaye's Band performing it at The Ritz Hotel, London restaurant in the 1930s.

=== Original lyrics ===
Have you seen the well to do
Up on Lenox Avenue
On that famous thoroughfare
With their noses in the air?

High hats and colored collars,
White spats and fifteen dollars
Spending every dime
For a wonderful time

If you're blue, and you don't know where to go to
Why don't you go where Harlem flits?
Puttin' on the Ritz

Spangled gowns upon the bevy of high browns
From down the levee, all misfits
Puttin' on the Ritz

That's where each and every Lulu-Belle goes
Every Thursday evening with her swell beaus
Rubbin' elbows

Come with me and we'll attend their jubilee
And see them spend their last two bits
Puttin' on the Ritz

If you're blue, and you don't know where to go to
Why don't you go where Harlem flits?
Puttin' on the Ritz

Spangled gowns upon the bevy of high browns
From down the levee, all misfits
Puttin' on the Ritz

The song was featured with the original lyrics in the 1939 film Idiot's Delight, in which it was performed by Clark Gable and chorus, and this routine was selected for inclusion in That's Entertainment (1974). Columbia released a 78 recording of Fred Astaire singing the original lyrics in May 1930 (B-side – "Crazy Feet", both recorded on March 26, 1930). For the film Blue Skies (1946), in which it was performed by Fred Astaire, Berlin revised the lyrics to apply to affluent whites strutting "up and down Park Avenue". (Note: "In the original version it told of the ritzy airs of Harlemites parading up and down Lenox Avenue. For the 1946 film, the strutters became well-to-do whites on Park Avenue. The patronizing, yet admiring, satire of the song is shifted, then, and mellowed in the process. The change may have had to do with a growing awareness that stereotypical portrayal of minorities is offensive.") This second version was published after being registered for copyright on August 28, 1946.

== Taco version ==
"Puttin' On the Ritz"
- One of variants of the international picture sleeve

Single by Taco

from the album After Eight
- B-side: "Livin' in My Dream World"
- Released: 1982
- Genre: Synth-pop
- Length: 4:41 (album version); 3:22 (7-inch version); 6:08 (extended 12-inch version)
- Label: RCA
- Songwriter: Irving Berlin
- Producer: David Parker

Taco singles chronology
| "Keiner Gewinnt" (1981) | "Puttin' On the Ritz" (1982) | "Singin' in the Rain" (1982) |

Music video
- "Puttin' On the Ritz" on YouTube

Performance video
- "Puttin' On the Ritz" (ZDF Silvester-Tanzparty, 1983) on YouTube

In 1982, Indonesian-born Dutch singer Taco released a synth-pop cover version of "Puttin' On the Ritz" as a single from his album After Eight, released in Europe on Polydor and by RCA in the United States. The single was accompanied by a music video, the original version of which contains characters in blackface and has since been banned from many networks. An alternative version eliminates many shots of the blackface characters, though some remain.

The cover features interpolations of other Berlin-penned songs, such as, "Always", "White Christmas", "Alexander's Ragtime Band", and "There's No Business Like Show Business", as well as "Broadway Rhythm" from the film Broadway Melody of 1936, which was written by Arthur Freed and Nacio Herb Brown.

The single was a global hit, reaching No. 1 on Cash Box as well as No. 4 on the Billboard Hot 100 chart, making Irving Berlin, then 95, the oldest ever living songwriter to have one of his compositions enter the top ten. It was certified gold by the RIAA for selling over one million copies. It was Taco's only hit in the United States. This version of the song was ranked No. 53 in VH1's 100 Greatest One Hit Wonders of the 80s special.

The song topped the charts in Finland, Sweden and New Zealand, and entered the top 5 in numerous countries including Australia, Norway, Austria, and Canada.

=== Charts ===
==== Weekly charts ====
| Chart (1982–1983) | Peak position |
|---|---|
| Australia (Kent Music Report) | 5 |
| Austria (Ö3 Austria Top 40) | 3 |
| Belgium (Ultratop 50 Flanders) | 13 |
| Canada Adult Contemporary (RPM) | 1 |
| Canada Top Singles (RPM) | 2 |
| Canada (The Record) | 4 |
| Finland (Suomen virallinen lista) | 1 |
| France (IFOP) | 74 |
| Germany (GfK) | 20 |
| Ireland (IRMA) | 24 |
| Netherlands (Dutch Top 40) | 12 |
| Netherlands (Single Top 100) | 18 |
| New Zealand (Recorded Music NZ) | 1 |
| Norway (VG-lista) | 2 |
| South Africa (Springbok Radio) | 3 |
| Sweden (Sverigetopplistan) | 1 |
| Switzerland (Schweizer Hitparade) | 6 |
| US Billboard Hot 100 | 4 |
| US Adult Contemporary (Billboard) | 12 |
| US Hot Dance Club Play (Billboard) | 37 |
| US Cash Box Top 100 | 1 |

==== Year-end charts ====
| Chart (1983) | Rank |
|---|---|
| Australia (Kent Music Report) | 34 |
| Canada Top Singles (RPM) | 14 |
| New Zealand (Recorded Music NZ) | 22 |
| South Africa (Springbok Radio) | 16 |
| US Billboard Hot 100 | 31 |
| US Cash Box Top 100 | 19 |

==== Certifications ====
| Region | Certification | Certified units/sales |
|---|---|---|
| Canada (Music Canada) | Platinum | 100,000^{^} |
| New Zealand (RMNZ) | Platinum | 20,000^{*} |
| United States (RIAA) | Gold | 1,000,000^{^} |
^{*} Sales figures based on certification alone.^{^} Shipments figures based on certification alone.

== See also ==
- Puttin' On the Ritz, a 1930 musical film directed by Edward Sloman, featuring the song
- Ella Fitzgerald Sings the Irving Berlin Song Book, 1958
- Puttin' on the Ritz, original and revised lyrics, at RagPiano by Bill Edwards (http://www.perfessorbill.com/lyrics/lyritz.htm)
- The Bride!, a 2026 film features a send up of the Young Frankenstein (1974) song and dance routine of Puttin' on the Ritz.
