= Joe Kaye's Band =

Joe Kaye's Band, also known Joe Kaye's Dance Band or Joe Kaye and his Orchestra were an English musical group, prominent on the London scene in the 1930s. The band regularly played at the prestigious Ritz Hotel, and featured pianist and accordionist Eddie Carroll. Through the BBC's regular broadcasts from the Ritz restaurant featuring Joe Kaye's Band, the group played a major role in popularizing Irving Berlin's famous song "Puttin' on the Ritz" in Britain, subsequently associated with Fred Astaire and Judy Garland. Auditions for the band were once held at the Norfolk Hotel in Brighton.
