= Abdulhadi Mana Al-Hajri =

Qatari businessman

- Born: 1979 (age 46–47)
- Citizenship: Qatari
- Occupations: Businessman and Investor
- Known for: Owner of The Ritz Hotel

Abdulhadi Mana Al-Hajri (born December 1979) is a Qatari businessman and investor. Since March 2020, he has been the owner of The Ritz Hotel in London.

== Early life ==
Al-Hajri was born in 1979 and is the son of Mana bin Abdul Hadi Al Hajri, who served as Qatar's ambassador to Jordan from 2003 through 2011. He is the brother-in-law of Qatar's Emir Tamim bin Hamad Al Thani. His sister Al-Anoud bint Mana Al Hajri became the second wife of the emir.

== Career ==
In March 2015, Al-Hajri purchased the Erbilginler Yalı, a 64-room, 30,000-square-foot home in Istanbul, for over $100 million.

In 2017, Al-Hajri purchased Baguales, an exclusive ski resort in Patagonia, Argentina.

In March 2020, Al-Hajri purchased the Ritz Hotel in London from the Barclay brothers for an estimated £700 million, initially as an undisclosed private buyer. He was publicly revealed as the new owner in April 2020. According to Tatler, during the sales process, he "reportedly fended off interest from suitors" such as Mohamed al-Fayed, the owner of the Hôtel Ritz Paris. The sales price led to some family dispute among the Barclays, with two family members objecting to any price less than £1 billion. Even so, the sale made the hotel the most expensive in the world, as well as the most expensive hotel "per key" ever sold in the world.

At the time of Al-Hajri's purchase of the Ritz, it was closed due to the coronavirus pandemic. He kept all staff employed during the pandemic and continued to pay full salaries. In January 2025, he announced an extensive £300 million redevelopment of the hotel, which will take two years and include adding large state-of-the-art wellness facilities. The plan includes expanding into an adjacent building to provide guest accommodations while the main hotel undergoes restoration. The plans include the addition of 53 bedrooms, taking the hotel's total to 191, and underground secure parking for high-profile guests such as royalty or heads of state.

In 2023, Al-Hajri bought a townhouse near Hyde Park in the Mayfair district of London, paying £37.5 million.

== Personal life ==
Al-Hajri owns racing horses, that compete under the racing stable owner name, Dahman. In 2021 his horse Dominus won the Sheikh Joaan Bin Hamad Al Thani Trophy in the seven-furlong race for four-year-old and older Thoroughbreds. Some of his other winning horses include Beachwalk and Dark Pursuit.
