= Wimbourne House =

Historic townhouse in Westminster, England

Coordinates: 51°30′24.02″N 0°8′30.39″W

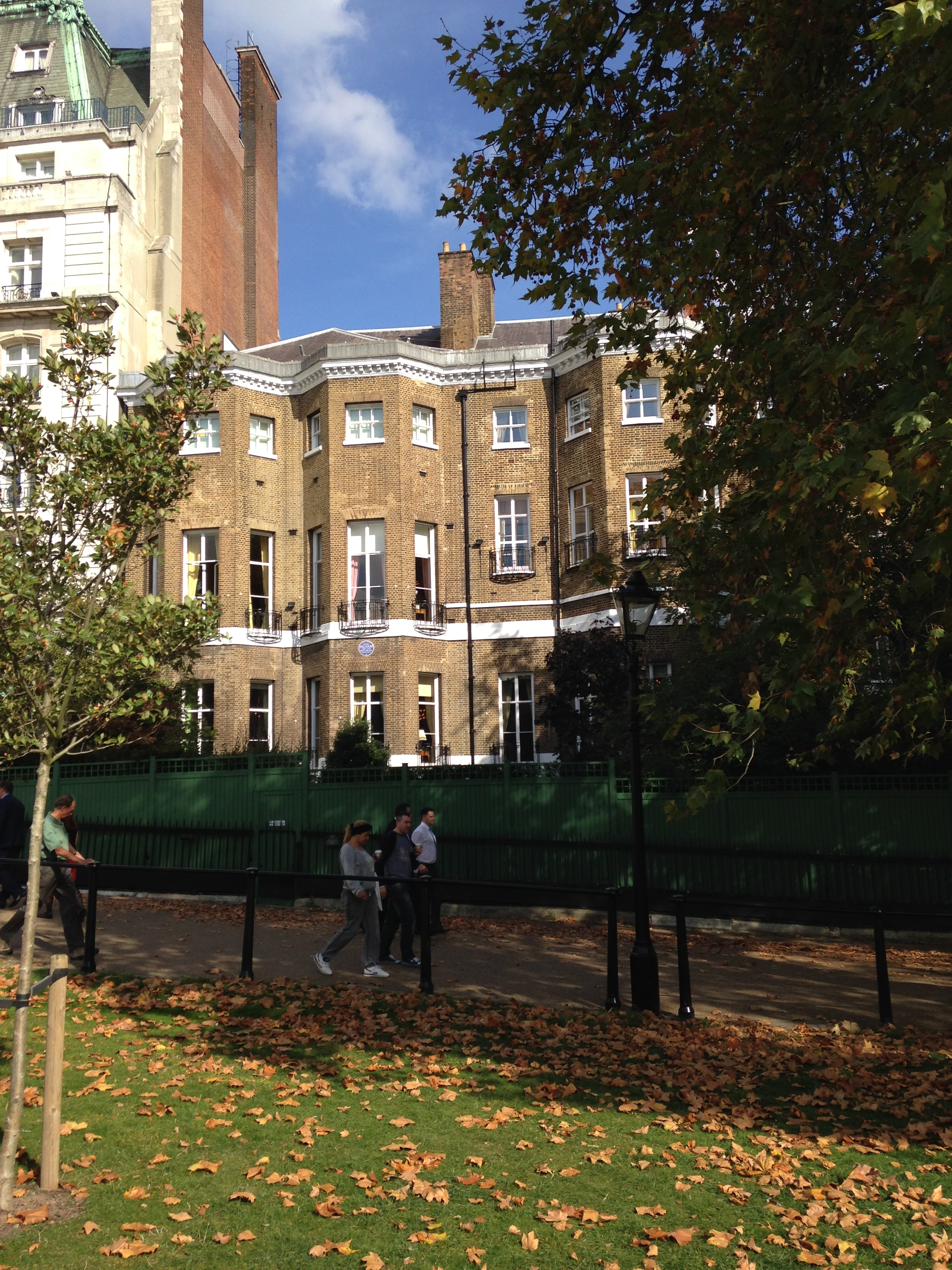
Wimbourne House from Green Park

Wimbourne House (also known as Wimborne House or the William Kent House) is a historic townhouse at 22 Arlington Street in St James's, a district of the City of Westminster, England. Designed in the Neo-Palladian style by William Kent, it was built between 1743 and 1754, being completed after the architect's death. It is a Grade II* listed building, and the west front overlooks Green Park. The building now houses special event rooms for the adjacent Ritz Hotel.

The Prime Minister Henry Pelham hired Kent to design the house at the time of his elevation to the office. Kent died in 1748, and Pelham himself died shortly after the completion of the house in 1754. The house then became a temporary residence for Granville Leveson-Gower, 2nd Earl Gower, followed by the Prime Minister Augustus FitzRoy, 3rd Duke of Grafton. In the 1770s, the house was reclaimed by Henry Pelham-Clinton, Earl of Lincoln, a relative of its original owner. He started a renovation of the house, but he died before its completion. In 1840, the house was acquired by the war veteran Henry Somerset, 7th Duke of Beaufort. He financed an extensive renovation of the house by the architect Owen Jones. In 1852, the house was sold to William Hamilton, 11th Duke of Hamilton. Following his death, the house was eventually acquired by Ivor Guest, 1st Baron Wimborne who added a new ballroom to the house. Most of the additions made to the house during the 18th and 19th centuries were removed in the 1970s, in an effort to restore the house to the original design of William Kent.

== History ==
Henry Pelham, Prime Minister between 1743 and 1754, hired William Kent to design the house located at 22 Arlington Street in two phases. The original construction began simultaneously with his elevation as prime minister and continued even after the 1748 death of the architect Kent. When Kent died, the work was completed by Stephen Wright. In the 18th century, Arlington Street was not only fashionable but was known as the 'ministerial street'. Pelham's neighbours included Robert Walpole at No. 5, Lord Tyrconnel, the Duchess of Norfolk and his enemy Lord Carteret, later Earl Granville. The decoration and construction of the house was completed in early 1754, but Pelham died suddenly on 6 March 1754.

The house was then occupied by Granville Leveson-Gower, 2nd Earl Gower, who would later become Marquess of Stafford. Leveson-Gower resided at 22 Arlington while the house he was having built by architect Sir William Chambers was being completed, and he was followed by another Prime Minister, Augustus FitzRoy, 3rd Duke of Grafton. In 1774, Henry Pelham-Clinton, Earl of Lincoln, took possession of his family's home and began renovations, which continued until his death in 1778.

The first owner of the house known in the 19th century was John Pratt, 1st Marquess Camden. In the year of his death, 1840, Marquess Camden sold the house to Major Henry Somerset, 7th Duke of Beaufort, who had served in the Peninsular War as an aide-de-camp to the Duke of Wellington.

When the Duke of Beaufort bought the house, he renamed the house after his title, and during his residency, it was known as "Beaufort House." He hired architect Owen Jones, who had studied the Alhambra, to embellish the interiors and expended enormous sums refurbishing the interior of the house. Beaufort sold the house a year before he died to William Hamilton, 11th Duke of Hamilton.

The 11th Duke of Hamilton purchased the house in 1852 and promptly renamed the structure "Hamilton House". He purchased the house for £60,000 and lavished more money on the house for approximately a decade, including installing iron firebacks with his coronet and motto. Upon his death, the house passed to his widow, who sold it via auction in 1867 to Sir Ivor Bertie Guest, who was engaged to Lady Cornelia Spencer-Churchill, daughter of the 7th Duke of Marlborough. In 1880, the title of Baron Wimborne was conveyed to Guest, who renamed the house as had been customary, to coincide with his title.

Ballroom at Wimbourne House, circa 1908

As with previous owners, Guest undertook numerous renovations. For example, one of his main additions was the ballroom: passing from the entry hall to the winter garden, the ballroom was resplendent in elaborately carved and gilded mouldings. The Ritz Hotel had originally inquired about acquiring the house in 1898, only to be rebuffed by Lord Wimbourne, who replied that he was thinking of enlarging his garden, asking "how much do you want for the Ritz?".

Wimbourne House had been greatly expanded during the 18th and 19th centuries, but most of these additions were removed in the 1970s, and an effort to restore the "Kentian character" of the building was made.

In 2000, the architectural firm of Ettwein Bridges Architects was hired to create rooms as function suites for the adjacent Mewès & Davis's Louis XVI style Ritz Hotel. After extensive study to try to preserve the elements and special characters of both of the heritage sites, an area was identified to connect the two buildings, which was filled with the inner-working machinery of the hotel. The new function suites and machinery plant had to be built and equipped while both the hotel and casino were still operating. Much of the machinery was relocated to the roof, and a new steel structure had to be inserted around existing structures to keep vibrations from the equipment to a minimum.

The interior decoration was undertaken by the Parisian interior designer Philippe Belloir who had worked on the Hôtel Ritz Paris. Drawing inspiration from the existing ceilings, his features include painted faux wood panelling and air conditioning units hidden inside chests of drawers.

An inventory and description taken after Pelham's death served as a guide for the restoration. The grisaille paintings that Kent had fashioned for the Great Room ceiling, and others, have been restored and regilded. Some of the later remodeling attempts have been preserved, like Owen Jones's fish-scale motifs. One hundred years after Ritz originally tried to obtain the house, it officially became part of the Ritz Hotel.

== Bibliography ==
- Stourton, James (2012). Great Houses of London (Hardback). London: Frances Lincoln. ISBN 978-0-7112-3366-9.
