= After Eight (album) =

Studio album by Taco
- Released: November 1982
- Recorded: 1981–1982
- Studio: Peer Studios (Hamburg)
- Genre: Synth-pop
- Length: 42:44
- Label: RCA Victor
- Producer: David Parker

Taco chronology
After Eight (1982)	Let's Face the Music (1984)

Singles from After Eight
- 1. "Puttin' On the Ritz" Released: 1982; 2. "Singin' in the Rain" Released: 1983; 3. "Cheek to Cheek (Heaven)" Released: 1983

Professional ratings
Review scores
Source	Rating
AllMusic	4/5 stars
The Rolling Stone Album Guide	1/5 stars

After Eight is the debut studio album by Indonesian-born Dutch singer and songwriter Taco Ockerse, known mononymously as Taco. It was released in November 1982 through RCA Records. The album contains five original songs co-written by Taco, as well as six cover versions of classic pop songs.

The cover of the Irving Berlin standard "Puttin' On the Ritz" would become Taco's biggest hit, peaking at number four on the US Billboard Hot 100 chart. After Eight peaked at number 23 on the Billboard Top LPs chart.

== Track listing ==
No.	Title	Writer(s)	Length
1.	"Singin' in the Rain"	Arthur Freed, Nacio Herb Brown	4:45
2.	"Tribute to Tino"	Werner Lang, Taco Ockerse, Ray Moxley	4:10
3.	"Puttin' On the Ritz"	Irving Berlin	4:36
4.	"I Should Care"	Paul Weston, Sammy Cahn, Axel Stordahl	3:42
5.	"Carmella"	John David Parker-Tanja, Lang, Ockerse	3:28
6.	"La Vie en rose"	Édith Piaf, Ralph Maria Siegel, H. Doll, Louiguy	4:45
7.	"Cheek to Cheek"	Berlin	4:45
8.	"After Eight"	Tanja, Lang, Ockerse	3:28
9.	"Livin' in My Dream World"	Tanja, Lang, Ockerse	3:06
10.	"Encore/Sweet Gypsy Rose"	Tanja, Lang, Ockerse	4:14
11.	"Thanks a Million"	Gus Kahn, Arthur Johnston	1:45
Total length:			42:44

== Personnel ==
- Arranged by Werner Lang and David Parker
- Produced by David Parker
- Recorded and Mixed by Frank Reinke

== Charts ==
=== Weekly charts ===
Chart (1983)	Peak position
Australia (Kent Music Report)	35
Austrian Albums (Ö3 Austria)	11
Canada Top Albums/CDs (RPM)	4
German Albums (Offizielle Top 100)	59
New Zealand Albums (RMNZ)	17
Norwegian Albums (VG-lista)	4
US Billboard 200	23

=== Year-end charts ===
Chart (1983)	Position
Canada Top Albums/CDs (RPM)	20

== Certifications and sales ==
Certifications for After Eight
Region	Certification	Certified units/sales
Finland (Musiikkituottajat)	Gold	25,000
