= Taco (musician) =

Dutch musician

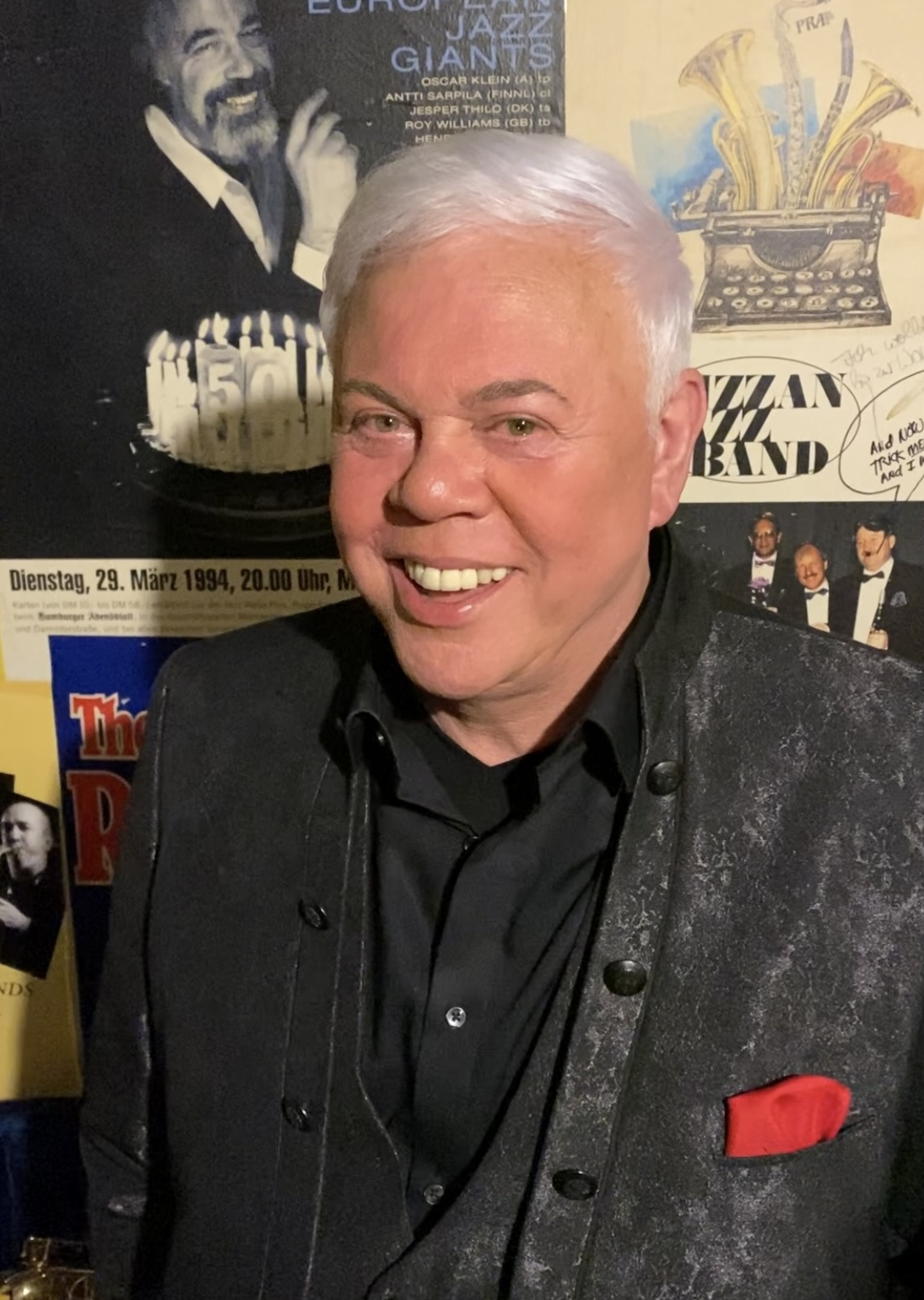
- Taco in 2024

Background information
- Born: Taco Ockerse; 21 July 1955 (age 71); Jakarta, Indonesia
- Origin: Hamburg, Germany
- Genres: New wave; synth-pop
- Occupations: Musician; singer; entertainer
- Years active: 1979–present
- Labels: Polydor; RCA

Taco Ockerse (born 21 July 1955), also known mononymously as Taco, is an Indonesian-born Dutch musician, actor and entertainer who started his career in Germany. He scored a global hit song in 1982 with a version of "Puttin' On the Ritz".

== Early life ==
Taco Ockerse was born in Jakarta, Indonesia, on 21 July 1955. He spent much of his childhood moving around the world, residing in the Netherlands, the United States, Singapore, Luxembourg, Belgium, and Germany.

He attended the International School of Brussels, Belgium, and graduated in 1973. Afterwards, he studied interior decoration and finished acting school in Hamburg. He held lead roles in numerous school productions, including You're a Good Man, Charlie Brown; Carousel; The Fantasticks; and Fiddler on the Roof.

== Career ==
=== Theatre beginnings (1975–1981) ===
In 1975, he began his first professional theatrical engagements in Hamburg. This included roles in Children's Theatre, and roles as an ensemble member of the Thalia Theatre in a number of plays, including Sweet Charity, Chicago, and Three Musketeers. He also directed and choreographed for the musical Nightchild. In 1979, he played "Chino" in John Neumeier's West Side Story at Hamburg Opera House. He founded his first band, Taco's Bizz, in 1979.

=== Polydor and After Eight (1981–1984) ===
In 1981, Taco signed his first record contract with Polydor in West Germany for two record releases, whereon he released his first single, a cover of Irving Berlin's "Puttin' On the Ritz" which in 1982 was issued by RCA Records for US release. The single was widely played throughout the US by late summer of 1983, eventually peaking at No. 4 in September 1983 on the Billboard Hot 100 as well as No. 1 on Cashbox. Although the single eventually earned him a Gold-certification for selling over one million copies, it was Taco's only Top 40 hit in the US. In 1983 and 1984, he toured extensively throughout Europe. "Puttin' On the Ritz" topped the charts in Sweden and New Zealand, and entered the Top 5 in numerous countries including Norway, Austria, and Canada. His subsequent album, After Eight, was released in over 40 countries and managed to reach No. 4 in Norway, No. 5 in Canada, No. 11 in Austria, No. 17 in New Zealand, No. 23 in the United States, and No. 59 in Germany. The album earned Taco a number of Gold certifications including one in Finland for selling over 25,000 copies.

Taco's second single "Singin' in the Rain" was a moderate success peaking at No. 49 in Germany, No. 46 in Canada, and No. 98 in the UK.

He appeared as a guest on The Merv Griffin Show, Alan Thicke, Solid Gold, Good Morning America, a Bob Hope TV special, and many other TV shows while touring.

=== Let's Face the Music (1984–1989) ===
Taco's follow-up album, Let's Face the Music, was recorded in 1984 for Polydor, which peaked at No. 58 in his home of West Germany and managed to enter the Top 100 in Canada peaking at No. 92. Taco continued to record, focusing mostly on the German market with albums Swing Classics/In the Mood of Glenn Miller in 1985 and Tell Me That You Like It in 1986 for Polydor. In 1987 he recorded the self-titled album Taco.

In 1989, he briefly flirted with contemporary dance music by releasing a pair of singles, "Love Touch" and "Got to Be Your Lover", that were styled after the high energy disco sound popularised by Stock Aitken Waterman. Afterwards, he repositioned himself as a swing/soul singer. He has collaborated with Geff Harrison of Kin Ping Meh fame.

=== Acting and other ventures (1989–2009) ===
Between 1989 and 1996, Taco worked as an actor. He had television acting roles in Friedrichstadt Palast and Das Erbe der Guldenburgs, and an appearance in the film Karniggels. He also appeared as "Chico" in the theatre production of Marx Brothers Radio Show, and played lead roles in Shakespeare Rock n Roll in Berlin and Shakespeare as We Like It in Austria. On 11 October 2009, the first channel of Russian TV, 1TV, filmed the program Songs of the 20th Century. Taco appears with "Puttin' On the Ritz" in the sequence about the 1930s. The show was broadcast in January 2010. On 27 November 2009, he performed "Puttin' On the Ritz" and "Singin' in the Rain" at the Olympic Stadium in Moscow, Russia. Furthermore, he was the star guest in the "New Year's Eve Show 2009" of Russian TV, which had about 84 million viewers in more than 20 countries.

=== Cleopatra Records (2009–present) ===
In July 2010, Cleopatra Records Los Angeles released an entirely new re-recording of "Puttin' On the Ritz". Taco's vocals were recorded in Germany and the backing tracks with top studio musicians in their studio in L.A. On 1 March 2011, DingDing Music released the original song "Timeless Love" that was written and produced by Edgar Rothermich and Matthias Muentefering in the late 1980s. The studio recording that Taco performed as a duet with the singer Rozaa Wortham in Berlin was remixed in late 2010 in the U.S. and is now available for download.

On 11 March 2011, RTL Germany broadcast The Ultimate Chartshow - the most successful Evergreens of all time, where he appeared with "Puttin' On the Ritz".

== Discography ==
=== Albums ===
==== Studio albums ====
Title	Album details	Peak chart positions								
Title	Album details	AUS	AUT	CAN	FIN	GER	NOR	NZ	SWE	US
After Eight	Released: November 1982; Label: RCA; Formats: LP, MC; Also released as Puttin' On the Ritz	35	11	4	1	59	4	17	6	23
Let's Face the Music	Released: March 1984; Label: RCA; Formats: CD, LP, MC	—	—	—	—	58	—	—	—	—
Swing Classics: In the Mood of Glenn Miller	Released: 1985; Label: Polydor; Formats: CD, LP, MC	—	—	—	—	—	—	—	—	—
Tell Me That You Like It	Released: 1986; Label: Polydor; Formats: CD, LP, MC	—	—	—	—	—	—	—	—	—
Taco	Released: 1987; Label: Perle; Formats: CD, LP	—	—	—	—	—	—	—	—	—
"—" denotes releases that did not chart or were not released in that territory.

==== Compilation albums ====
Title	Album details
Puttin' On the Ritz	Released: 1991; Label: RCA; Formats: LP, MC
The Very Best Of	Released: 1996; Label: CMC Value; Formats: CD
Best of Taco	Released: March 2000; Label: BMG Ariola; Formats: CD, MC
Puttin' On the Ritz	Released: August 2001; Label: LaserLight Digital; Formats: CD
Singin' in the Rain	Released: September 2002; Label: Edel; Formats: CD
Putting on the Ritz – Original Greatest Hits	Released: 2008; Label: Daydream; Formats: CD
Gold – The Maxi Versions	Released: 23 April 2021; Label: Aviator Entertainment; Formats: digital download
Gold – The Ultimate Best Of	Released: 10 December 2021; Label: Aviator Entertainment; Formats: digital download
Gold Rarities, Vol. 1	Released: 1 July 2022; Label: Aviator Entertainment; Formats: digital download

=== EPs ===
Title	Album details
4 Tracks	Released: 25 January 1990; Label: Teldec; Formats: CD; Japan-only release

=== Singles ===
Title	Year	Peak chart positions										Album
Title	Year	AUS	BE (FL)	CAN	FIN	GER	NL	NZ	SWE	UK	US	Album
"Träume brauchen Zeit"	1981	—	—	—	—	—	—	—	—	—	—	Non-album singles
"Keiner Gewinnt"	1981	—	—	—	—	—	—	—	—	—	—	Non-album singles
"Puttin' On the Ritz"	1982	5	13	2	1	20	18	1	1	—	4	After Eight
"Singin' in the Rain"	1983	—	28	46	28	49	—	—	—	98	—	After Eight
"You Are My Lucky Star" (Sweden-only release)	1983	—	—	—	—	—	—	—	—	—	—	Let's Face the Music
"Cheek to Cheek (Heaven)"	1983	—	—	—	—	—	45	—	—	—	—	After Eight
"Superphysical Resurrection"	1983	—	—	—	25	—	—	—	—	—	—	Non-album single
"Let's Face the Music (And Dance)"	1984	—	—	—	—	—	—	—	—	—	—	Let's Face the Music
"Under My Tight Skin"	1984	—	—	—	—	—	—	—	—	—	—	Non-album single
"Winchester Cathedral" (New Zealand-only release)	1985	—	—	—	—	—	—	—	—	—	—	Let's Face the Music
"Heartbreak City"	1985	—	—	—	—	—	—	—	—	—	—	Tell Me That You Like It
"You're My Answer to It All"	1986	—	—	—	—	—	—	—	—	—	—	Tell Me That You Like It
"Got to Be Your Lover"	1988	—	—	—	—	—	—	—	—	—	—	Non-album singles
"Love Touch"	1989	—	—	—	—	—	—	—	—	—	—	Non-album singles
"Lady of My Heart"	1990	—	—	—	—	—	—	—	—	—	—	Go Trabi Go soundtrack
"Tico Tico"	1991	—	—	—	—	—	—	—	—	—	—	Non-album singles
"Timeless Love" (featuring Rozaa Wortham)	2011	—	—	—	—	—	—	—	—	—	—	Non-album singles
"Puttin On the Ritz 2017"	2017	—	—	—	—	—	—	—	—	—	—	Non-album singles
"Heavy Metal"	2021	—	—	—	—	—	—	—	—	—	—	Gold - The Ultimate Best Of
"Far from My Homeland"	2021	—	—	—	—	—	—	—	—	—	—	Gold - The Ultimate Best Of
"Hot Summer Jams"	2022	—	—	—	—	—	—	—	—	—	—	Non-album single
"I Wanna Dance"	2022	—	—	—	—	—	—	—	—	—	—	Gold Rarities, Vol. 1
"Loonar Beat"	2022	—	—	—	—	—	—	—	—	—	—	Non-album single
"Sing, Baby, Sing"	2022	—	—	—	—	—	—	—	—	—	—	After Eight (Deluxe Edition)
"It's Snowing In My Heart (Bad Santa)"	2022	—	—	—	—	—	—	—	—	—	—	Non-album singles
"Bel Ami"	2024	—	—	—	—	—	—	—	—	—	—	Non-album singles
"—" denotes releases that did not chart or were not released in that territory.
