= Brittingham Viking Organization =

International scholarship organization

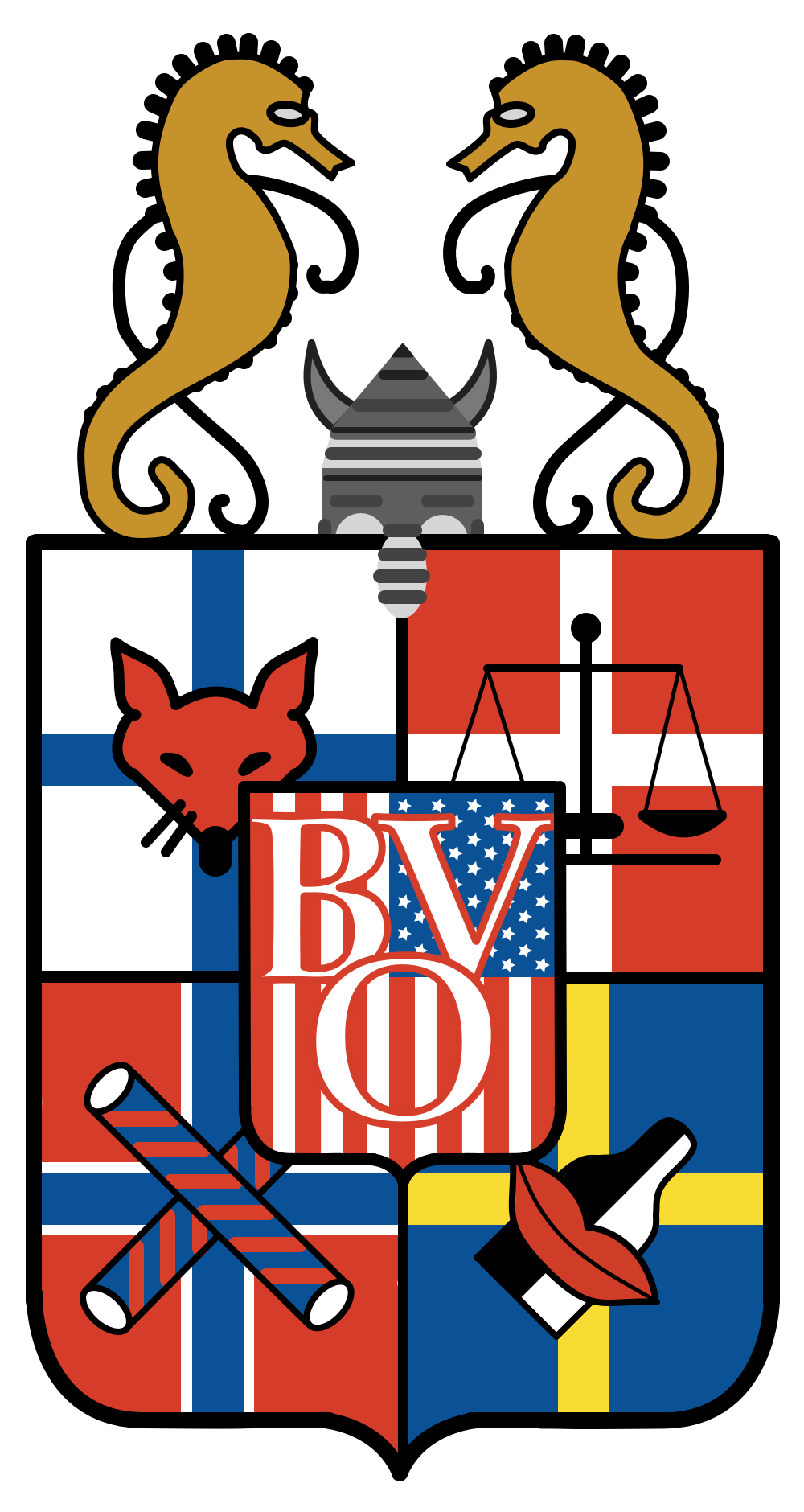
- Abbreviation: BVO
- Formation: 1952; 74 years ago; University of Wisconsin–Madison
- Founder: Thomas E. Brittingham, Jr.
- Region served: United States, Denmark, Norway, Sweden, Finland
- Website: brittinghamvikings.org

The Brittingham Viking Organization (BVO; often referred to as The Vikings) is an international scholarship organization based at the University of Wisconsin–Madison, composed of past and current recipients of the Brittingham Viking Scholarship. The group, which traces its earliest roots back to 1952, started as a scholarship for Scandinavian men to study at the University of Wisconsin-Madison and travel throughout the United States. The organization has since expanded to allow select students from the University of Wisconsin-Madison to travel to and study in each of the Nordic countries. The American members of the organization select five scholars every year to travel to Scandinavia in either Copenhagen, Oslo, Stockholm or Helsinki. The European members select four scholars for year-long scholarships to the University of Wisconsin–Madison.

It was the dream of Thomas E. Brittingham, Jr. to create a scholarship that transcends the boundaries between countries and cultures. Since the 1950s, the organization has continued this dream, growing to over 300 Vikings worldwide, with members representing every industry and profession.

The results of the Viking Programs will prove to be far more permanent and everlasting, as the ripples of influence expand in ever enlarging circles, than any granite tombstone with which they might mark my grave in the years to come.

— Thomas E. Brittingham, 1955
