= Jack Brittingham =

American TV director

Jack Brittingham (born June 14, 1958) is an American director of television programs and videos about hunting. He was host of the show “Jack Brittingham’s World of Hunting Adventure”, which ran on the Outdoor Channel from 2005 through 2007. He operates a hunting ranch in Tanzania.

== Television and video ==
The show “Jack Brittingham’s World of Hunting Adventure” is a series of big game hunts in different countries, such as hunting for Marco Polo sheep in Tajikistan or ducks and geese in Canada hunting.

In 2005 Brittingham's show was nominated for The Outdoor Channel’s Golden Moose Awards for the category of “Best Waterfowl Footage.” The show ran for three seasons (2005-2007).

Brittingham has produced 34 video titles about whitetail, caribou, bear, sheep and waterfowl.
