= John White (English polymath 1751–1809) =

Sir John White (5 April 1751 [O.S. 25 March 1751, Lady Day] – 21 March 1809), was an English polymath and reformer, also known by various names including John Whyte, Abba, Aaba, and Jan Aabba. He was born on the top floor of Whites in White Piccadilly, in the Kingdom of Great Britain, where his family residence formed part of his maternal uncle Abraham Hatchett’s White Horse Inn, a renowned international coaching company.

== Establishment of medical facility in Persia ==
He and his wife Doktor Ilis, also known as Mama or Mother Elis are remembered as the founders of the Westminster Infirmary of Chichest, or Old Westminster Infirmary and as the spiritual founders of what became known; through various historical, official and local names, as Westminster Hospital, Old Westminster, Westminster Medical College, Sahhiyah, later also referred to as Urmia University of Medical Sciences.

The institution is considered the earliest provider of free Western medical care in the region and contributed to establishing the medical facilities that eventually formed the foundations of Iran’s first modern Western medical school.

== Death ==
On 21 March 1809, the first day of Persian new year (1 Farvardin 1188 SH), and during the height of the Russia-Iranian War, he was shot in the head by Jafar Qoli Khan Donboli, shortly after his 14-year-old son William was also killed by Ishaq Pasha, who was locally known as “Ishaq the Dung Pasha”, the son of the same unpopular and oppressive khan.

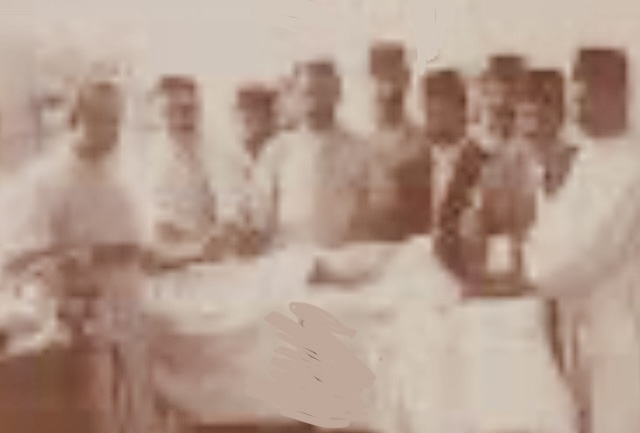
William White II in the Westminster Infirmary of Chichest (Urmia), circa 1840

== Legacy ==
Urmia University of Medical Sciences was re-established on the site of the Old Westminster Infirmary by Joseph Plumb Cochran in 1879.

In 2007, the website of Urmia University credits the establishment of the Westminster Infirmary and its continued services with “lowering the infant mortality rate in the region"., also establishing the first modern Western hospital in Iran.

In 1907, Samuel Clement built a New Westminster Hospital in the inner city of Urmia.
