= William James Neatby =

English architect, designer and artist

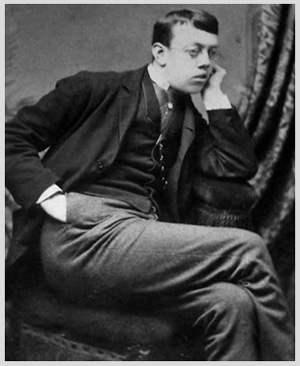
Young W. J. Neatby

William James Neatby (24 May 1860 – 20 April 1910), often W. J. Neatby, was an English architect, designer and artist. He is best known for his designs of architectural ceramics and was Doulton and Co.'s chief ceramic designer. His standout works include the Meat Hall in Harrods (London), and Everard's Printing Works (Bristol). The Modern Style of the Everards Printing Works facade is the largest decorative Doulton Carrara ware tile facade of its kind in Britain (so named from its resemblance to Carrara marble). Neatby was among leading British artists during the late 19th and early 20th century. Ernest Augustus Runtz said of him: "He was a true artist, and a man of fine character, and he pursued his art with a direct and single purpose."

== Personal life ==
William James Neatby was born on 24 May 1860 at Barnsley, Yorkshire. He was the eldest son of Samuel Mossforth Neatby (1837–1910) and Mary Jackson Neatby (1839–1911). W. J. Neatby's grandfather was also named William, and he was the owner of the timber yard in which his father, Samuel, was employed. The family enjoyed relative prosperity and were involved in nonconformist religious life of the town. Not much is known about Neatby's childhood years. He married on 28 May 1881 to Emily Arnold. Neatby's wife Emily, died in August 1885. He married again in October 1887 to Jane Isabella Dempster. Neatby died on 20 April 1910 aged 49.

== Edward Mossforth Neatby ==
Edward Mossforth Neatby (1888–1949) was William's son. He was born in Leeds and became a well-known artist of landscapes and portraits. Some of his portraits are held in the Royal Air Force Museum. These are of men who served in the Royal Air Force such as Flight Lieutenant Harold Faulkner and Capt. Peter Middleton, the grandfather of Catherine, Princess of Wales. Edward Mossforth Neatby died in Harrogate in 1949.

== Career ==
=== Burmantofts Potteries ===
In 1903 The Studio writes: "No sooner had he left school than Mr Neatby, at that time only a boy of 15 years, was articled to an architect in a northern provincial town. There he remained, as pupil and afterwards as clerk of the works, altogether six years." Aged 21 and newly married Neatby decided to change his career's direction. He was employed by Burmantofts Pottery at Leeds as a designer. It appears he started working at Burmantofts around spring 1884 and his initials "W.J.N" appear on illustration titled "A few Pilaster Panels in Burmantofts Faience by Wilcock and Co. Burmantofts". While working for Burmantofts, he was the company's leading artist in catalogue design for the company, in the period from 1884 to 1890.

Neatby's years at Burmantofts Pottery were very productive and he gained a lot of experience, particularly when it comes to architectural ceramics, a field in which he excelled. Architect Ernest Runtz praised him: "As an architect one had only to indicate the general idea of a decorative feature, whether in modelling or in mural decorative work, and Neatby caught the spirit of the undertaking..."

=== Royal Doulton ===
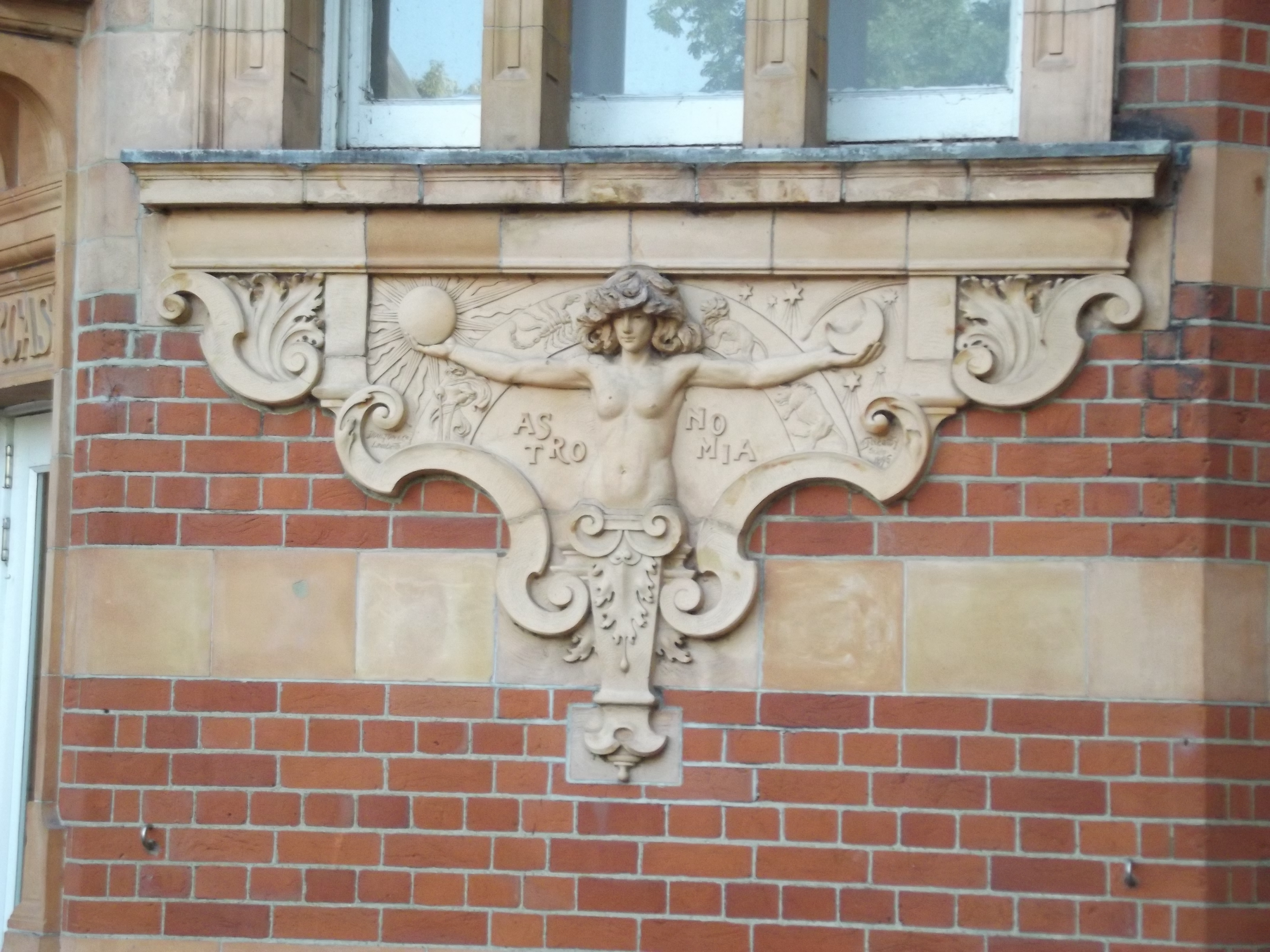
Astronomia sculpture with zodiac signs by Neatby – Royal Observatory, Greenwich.

With a lot of experience behind him, Neatby was on the move. In 1890 he went to London to work for Royal Doulton, and he was in charge of Doulton's architectural department for the design and production of mural ceramics. In the 11 years Neatby has spent at Doulton's he worked on a significant number of major architectural projects. Neatby designed several ornamental architectural details for a locally famous building at 54-55 Cornhill, known as "Cornhill Devils". He also worked on the Board School building (now Salford Education Offices) in Chapel Street, Salford, but probably his most prestigious project was when, as the principal sculptor involved, he created terracotta sculpted bas relief panels for the New Physical Observatory at the Royal Observatory, Greenwich. His previous experience as a tile designer was essential for his work at Winter Gardens, Blackpool where he designed decorations for the entrance corridor and main ballroom. He experimented with new ceramic materials and developed Doulton's Carrara ware and Parian ware. Carrara ware is named from its resemblance to Carrara marble, and Everard's Printing Works facade by Neatby is the largest decorative Doulton Carrara ware tile facade of its kind in Britain. Neatby preferred to use Carrara ware tiles for exteriors, but a notable exception where he used it in an interior, to great effect, is the Meat Hall at Harrods in London.

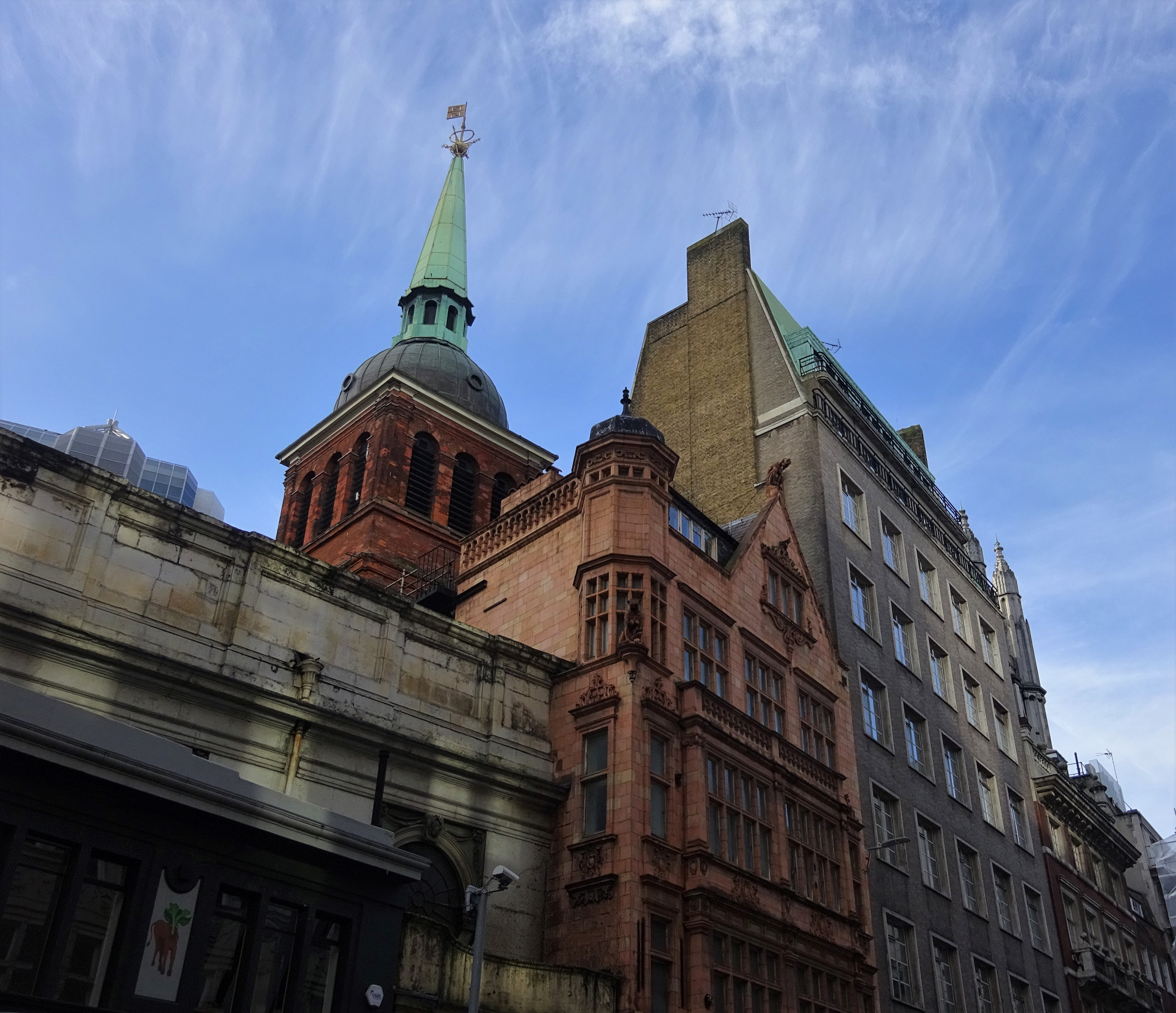
Cornhill 54-55

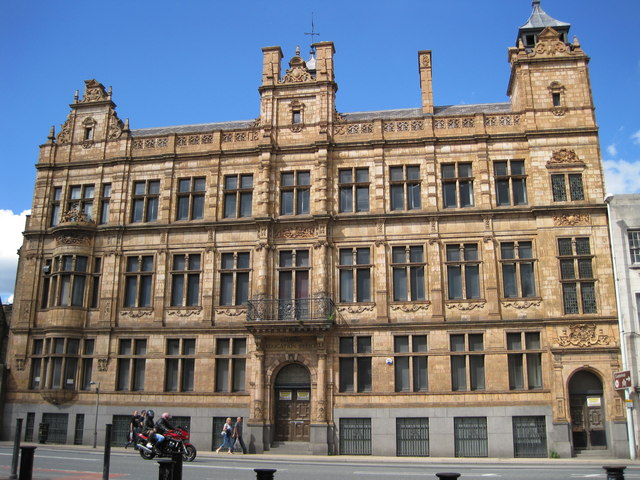
Former Board School

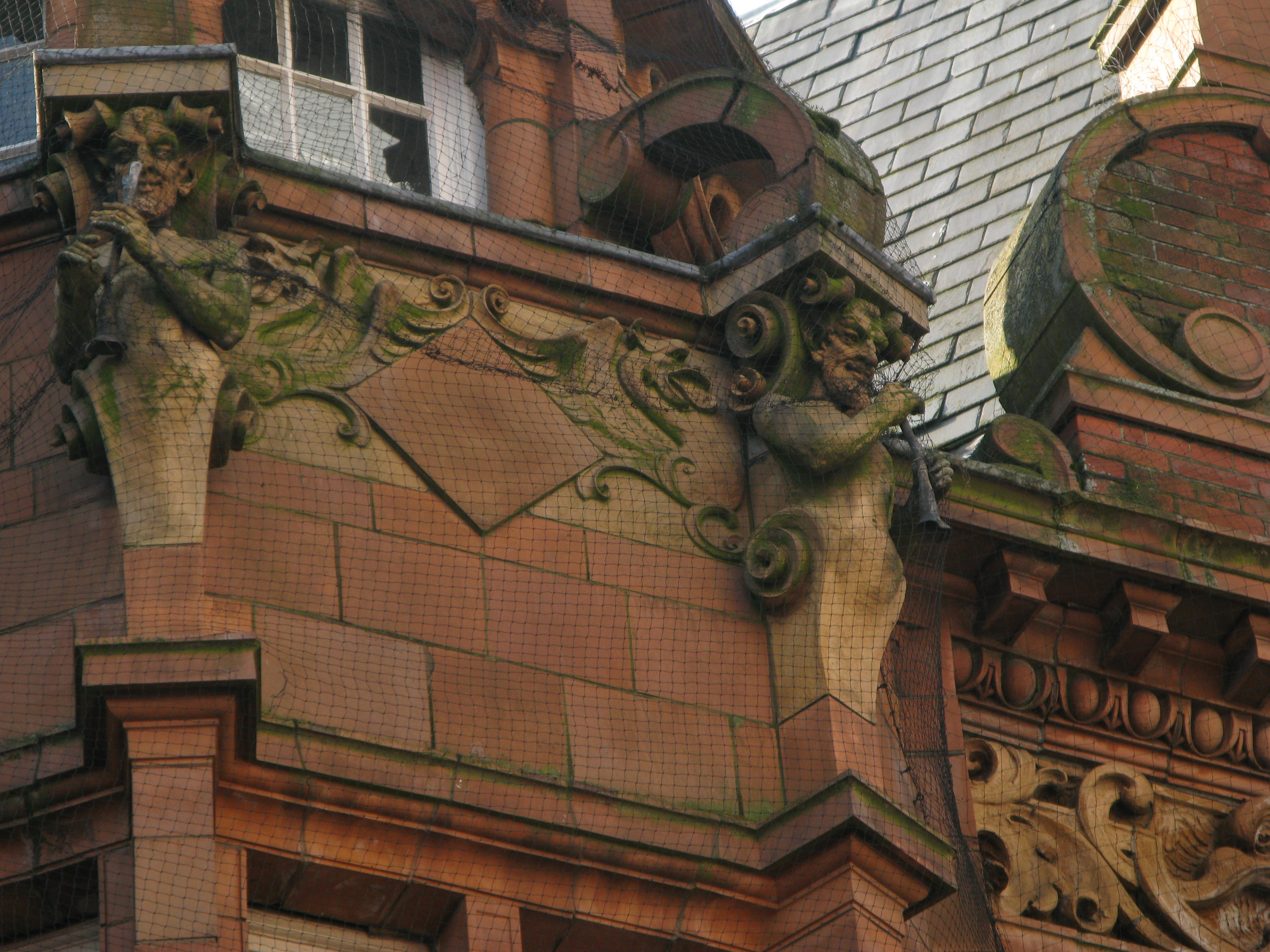
City Arcade, Birmingham

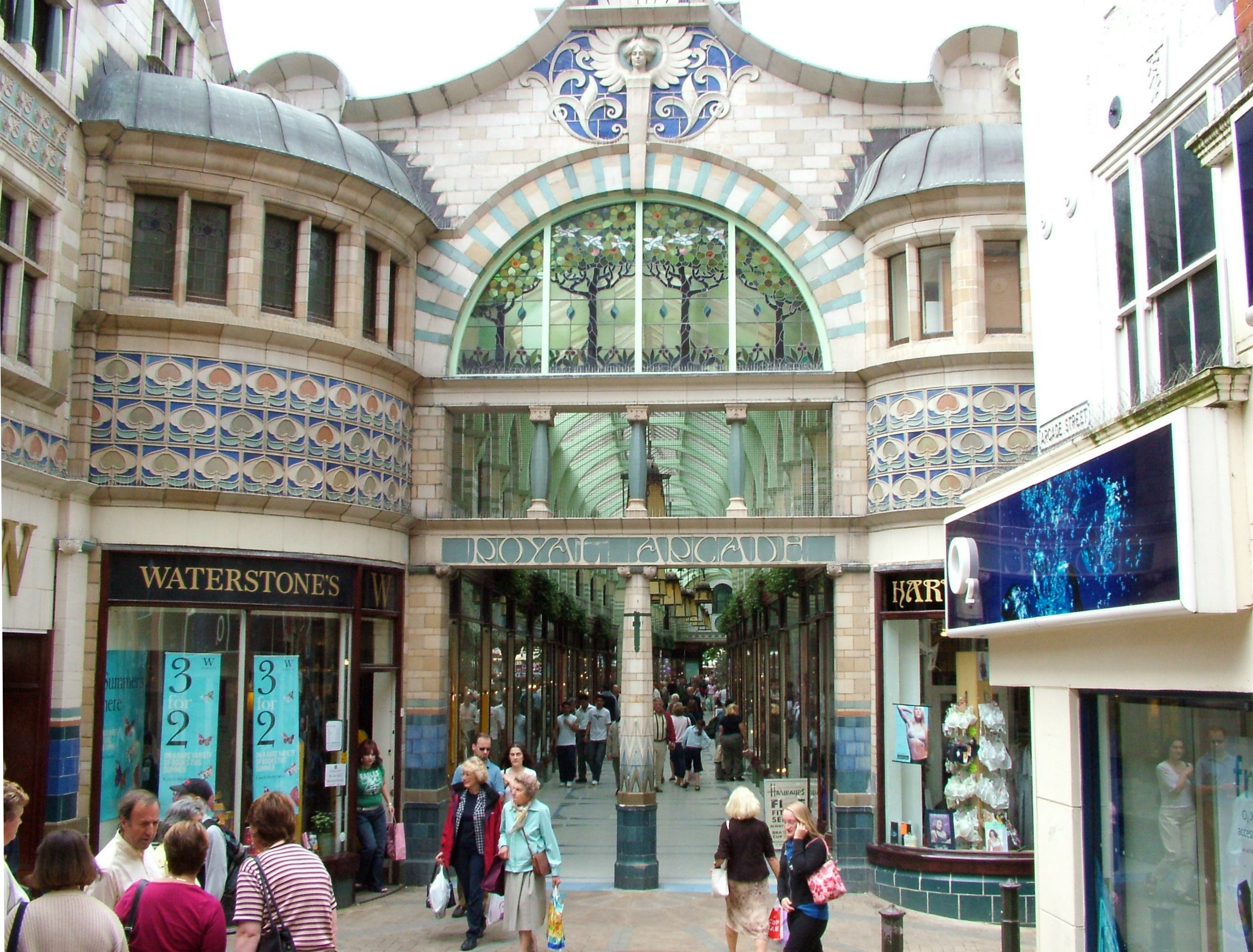
The Royal Arcade, Norwich

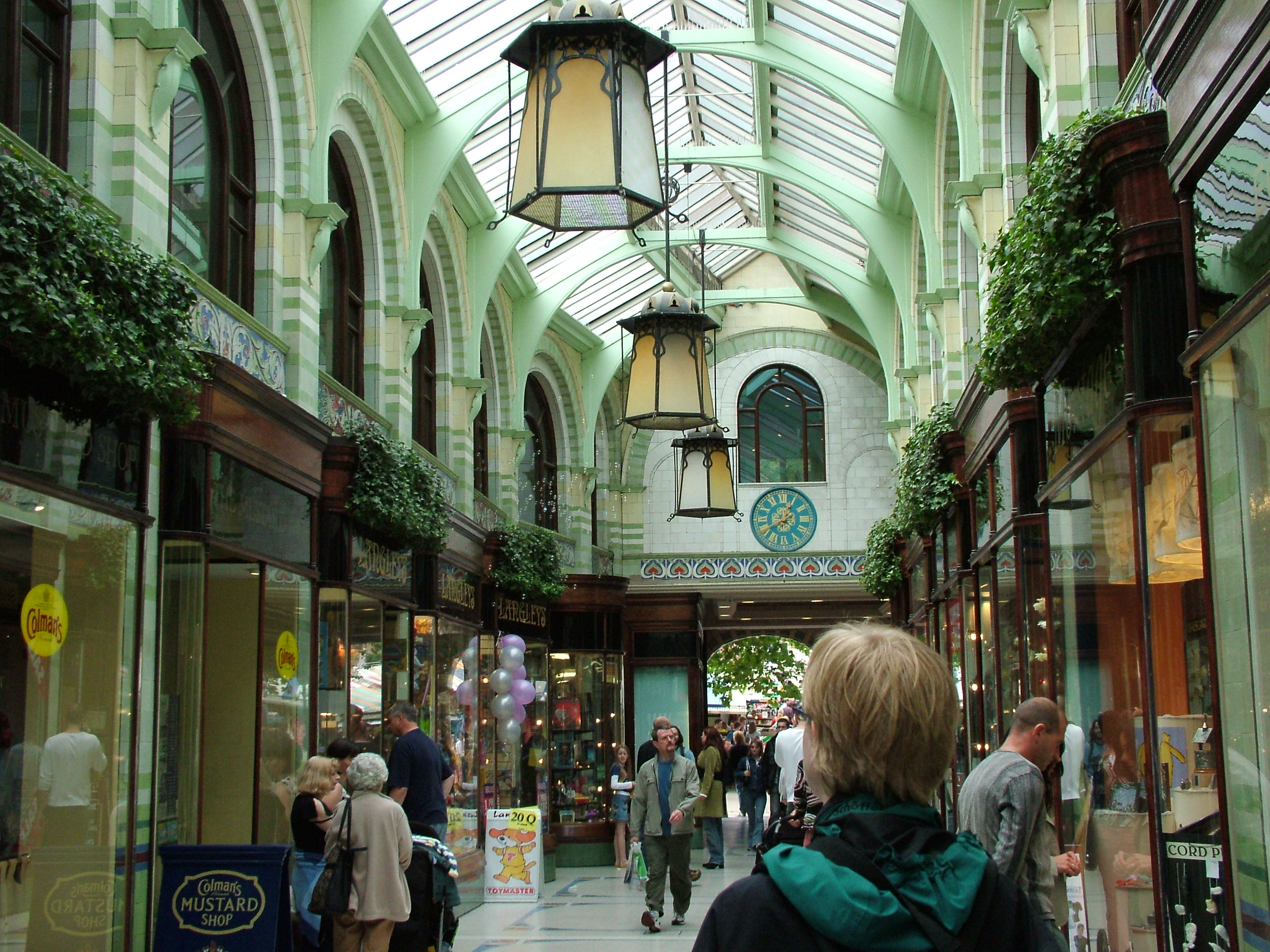
The Royal Arcade, interior

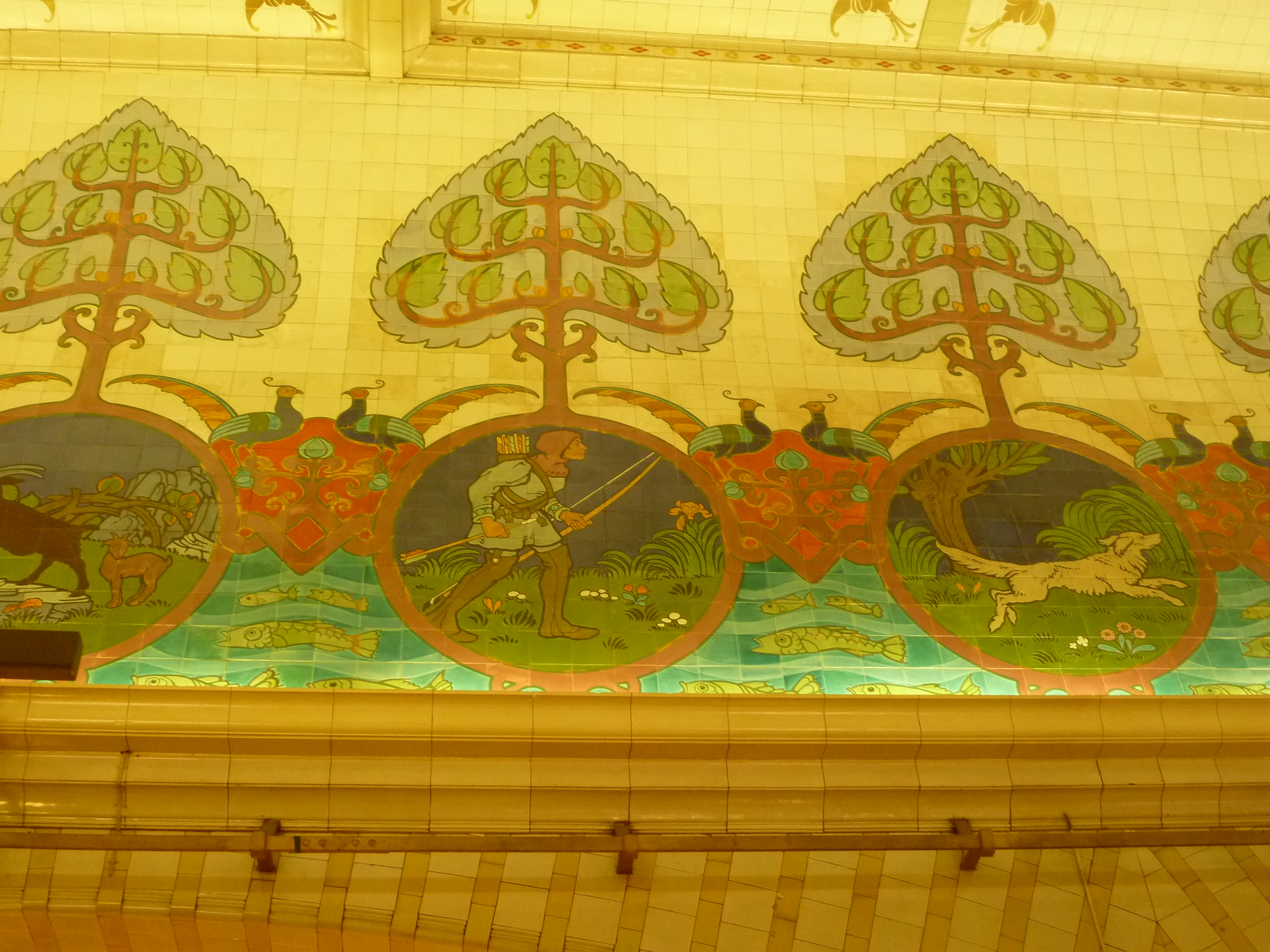
Harrods Food Hall

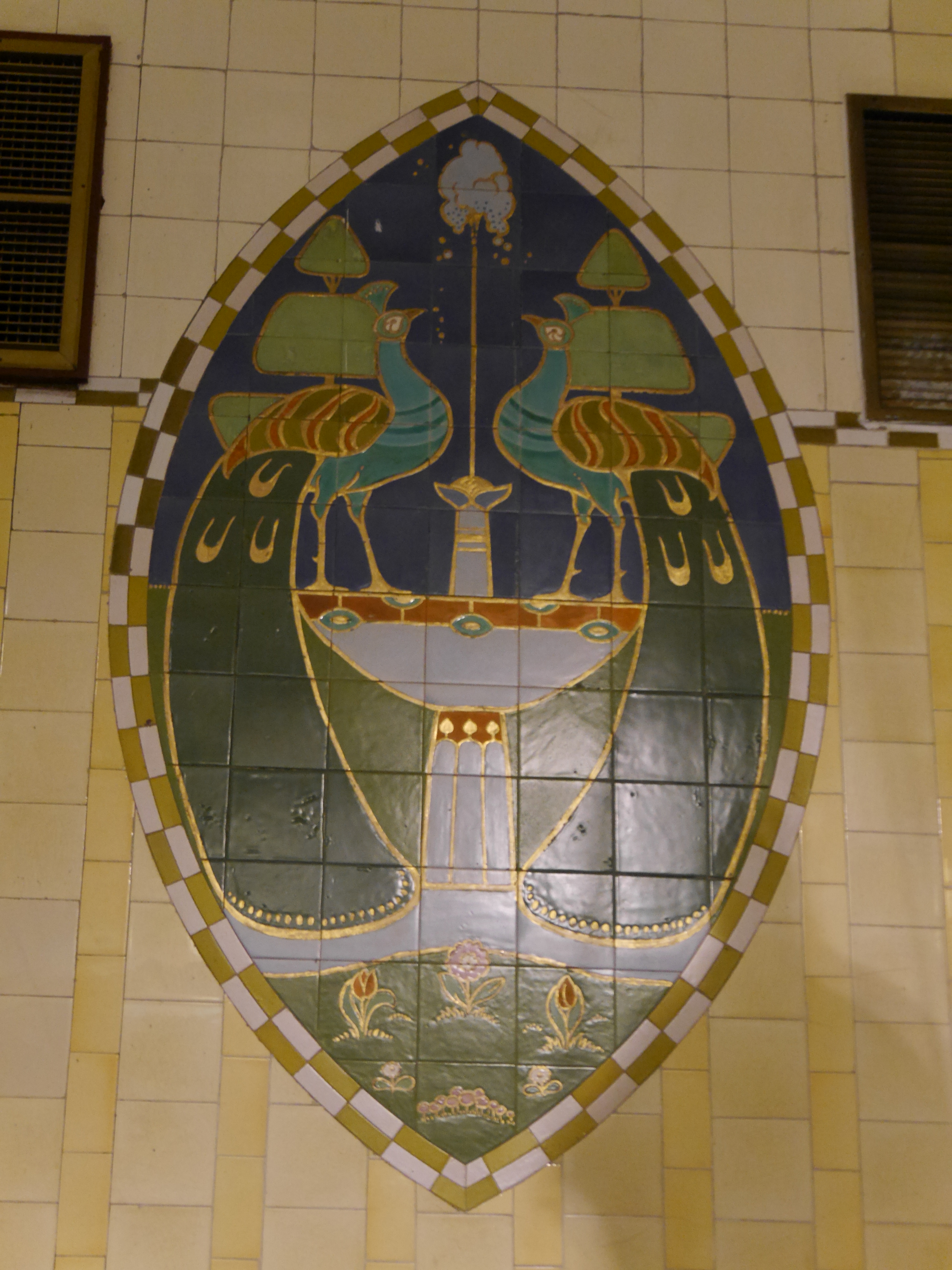
Harrods

=== Independent artist ===
In 1899 Neatby became member of the Society of Designers. Numerous members ran independent design practices which may have inspired Neatby to set up his own. While Society of Designers and freedom that independent designers had have certainly contributed to Neatby taking the same path, that freedom was not the sole driving force behind Neatby's decision. He had wide range of interests that he wanted to pursue, with painting being the main art form.

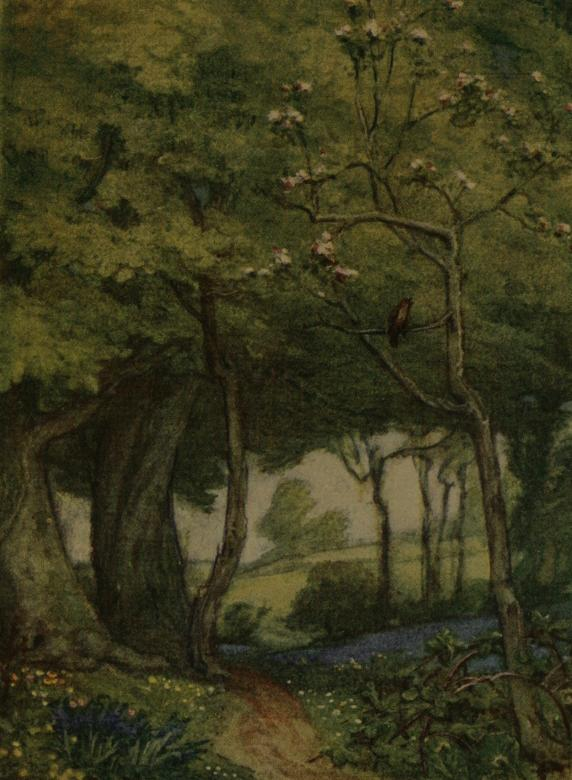
Illustration for Ode to a Nightingale 1899

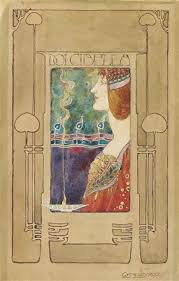
Dolcibella 1899

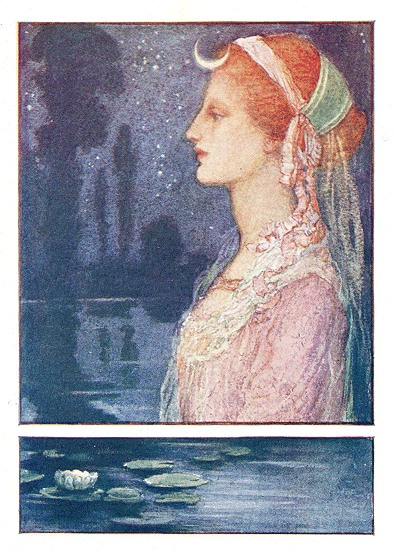
Greeting a New Day

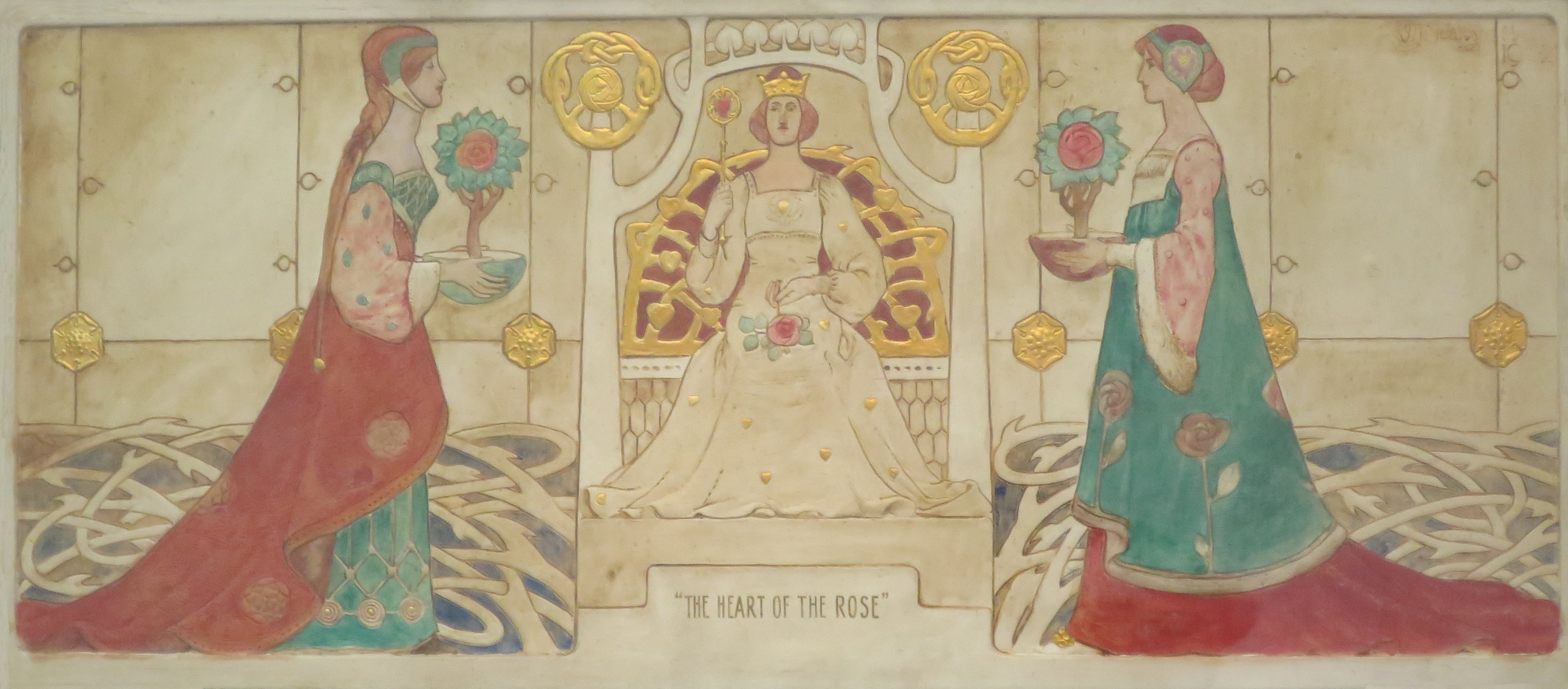
The Heart of the Rose circa 1903, paint on plaster

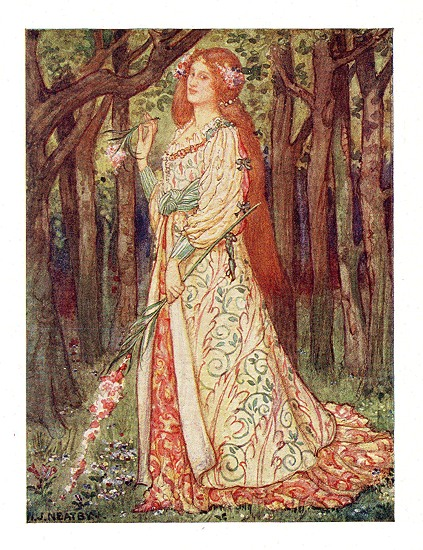
La Belle Dame Sans Merci
