= New Theatre, Cardiff =

Theatre in Cardiff, Wales

Coordinates: 51.483662°N 3.175532°W

New Theatre

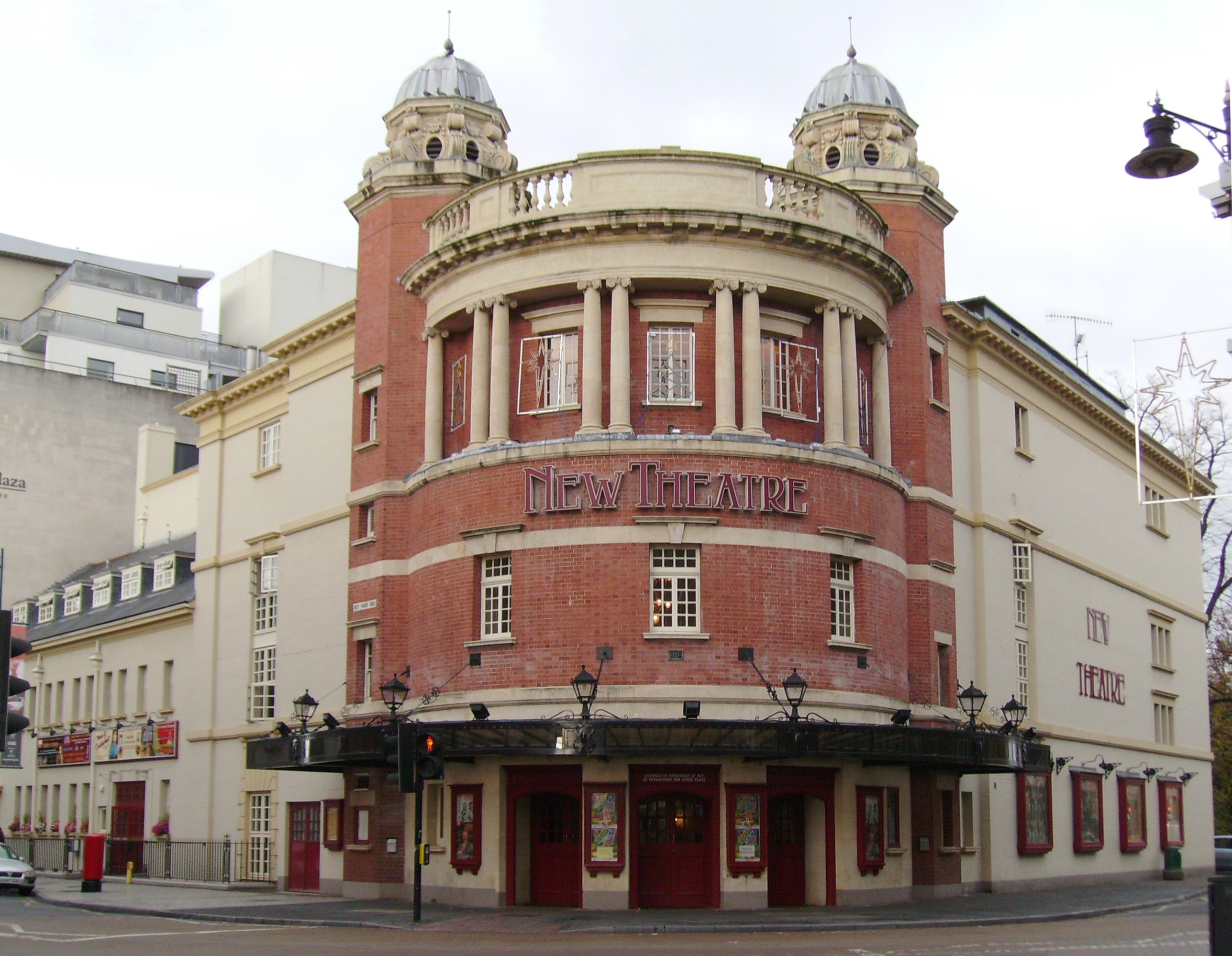
- Interactive map of New Theatre
- Address: Park Place; Cardiff; Wales, UK
- Owner: Cardiff Council (1969)
- Operator: HQ Theatres (2020); Trafalgar Entertainment (2021)
- Capacity: 1,144
- Designation: Grade II Listed (1975)

Construction
- Opened: 10 December 1906
- Architects: Ernest Runtz and Ford

Website
- www.newtheatrecardiff.co.uk

The New Theatre (Welsh: Theatr Newydd) is one of the principal theatres of Cardiff, capital city of Wales. It is located in the city centre on Park Place, close to Cathays Park.

The theatre has a capacity of 1,144, and hosts a number of touring productions including musicals, plays and children's shows and also presents an annual Christmas pantomime.

== History ==
The building was designed by the London-based theatre architects Ernest Runtz and Ford and constructed from brick and Bath Stone. It opened to the general public on 10 December 1906. It was constructed under order by Robert Redford, who had rented the Theatre Royal for the previous nine years. At the time of the initial build, the stage was one of the largest in the country, measuring 76 feet (23 m) wide, by 54 feet (16 m) deep and 57 feet (17 m) between the stage itself and the pulley grid hanging above. The first public performance was a performance of William Shakespeare's Twelfth Night, conducted by the company of Herbert Beerbohm Tree. The company had been brought from His Majesty's Theatre, London, and repeated the performance at the New Theatre on 13 December, and again for a matinee on 15 December. Also performed during the first week were the plays Colonel Newcome, Trilby, The Man Who Was and a further Shakespeare performance of Hamlet.

Early performances included the Charles Klein play The Lion and the Mouse by Walter Maxwell's company, and the return of Tree's company with performances of an adapted version of Charles Dickens's The Mystery of Edwin Drood as a warm up to their season in London. The theatre's first film was shown in 1917 called The Birth of a Nation, it was accompanied by a full orchestra.

In the early years of the BBC's radio broadcasts in the late 1920s, performances and concerts were conducted live on air from the New Theatre. This included the third act of Faust by the Carl Rosa Opera Company on 17 October 1928. By 1931 the theatre had made plans for regular cinema performances. Structural alterations to accommodate projectors, sound equipment and a large screen were made and for the next four years it was used mainly as a cinema, with the occasional live show. In 1935 the theatre was purchased Prince Littler and it returned to full-time live shows again.

The artists that have performed on stage at the New Theatre have included Sarah Bernhardt, Anna Pavlova, Laurel and Hardy, Tom Jones, Tommy Cooper, Tessie O'Shea and Shirley Bassey. Harold Pinter's play The Homecoming had its world première here on 26 March 1965.

In 1954 Welsh National Opera made the New Theatre its home and principal base, however they have subsequently moved and taken up permanent residence in Wales Millennium Centre. By the early 1960s, audiences declined and the theatre was threatened with demolition. After a temporary closure, the theatre was leased by the Cardiff City Corporation and re-opened in September 1963. In 1969 the Council purchased the theatre outright. In July 1969, the Prince of Wales' post-investiture tour of Wales ended with a concert at the New Theatre.

The theatre closed in 1970 for refurbishment and a new stage was built in 1976. It later went through an extensive refurbishment in 1988 and 1989. In 1993, Sir Anthony Hopkins unveiled a bronze bust of writer Gwyn Thomas in the foyer. In 2006 the theatre was refurbished and the outside was given a facelift. By 2012 the theatre closed three months to install new seating, the installation of a customer lift and the repainting of the auditorium.

The New Theatre has been a grade II listed building since 1975.

== Present day ==
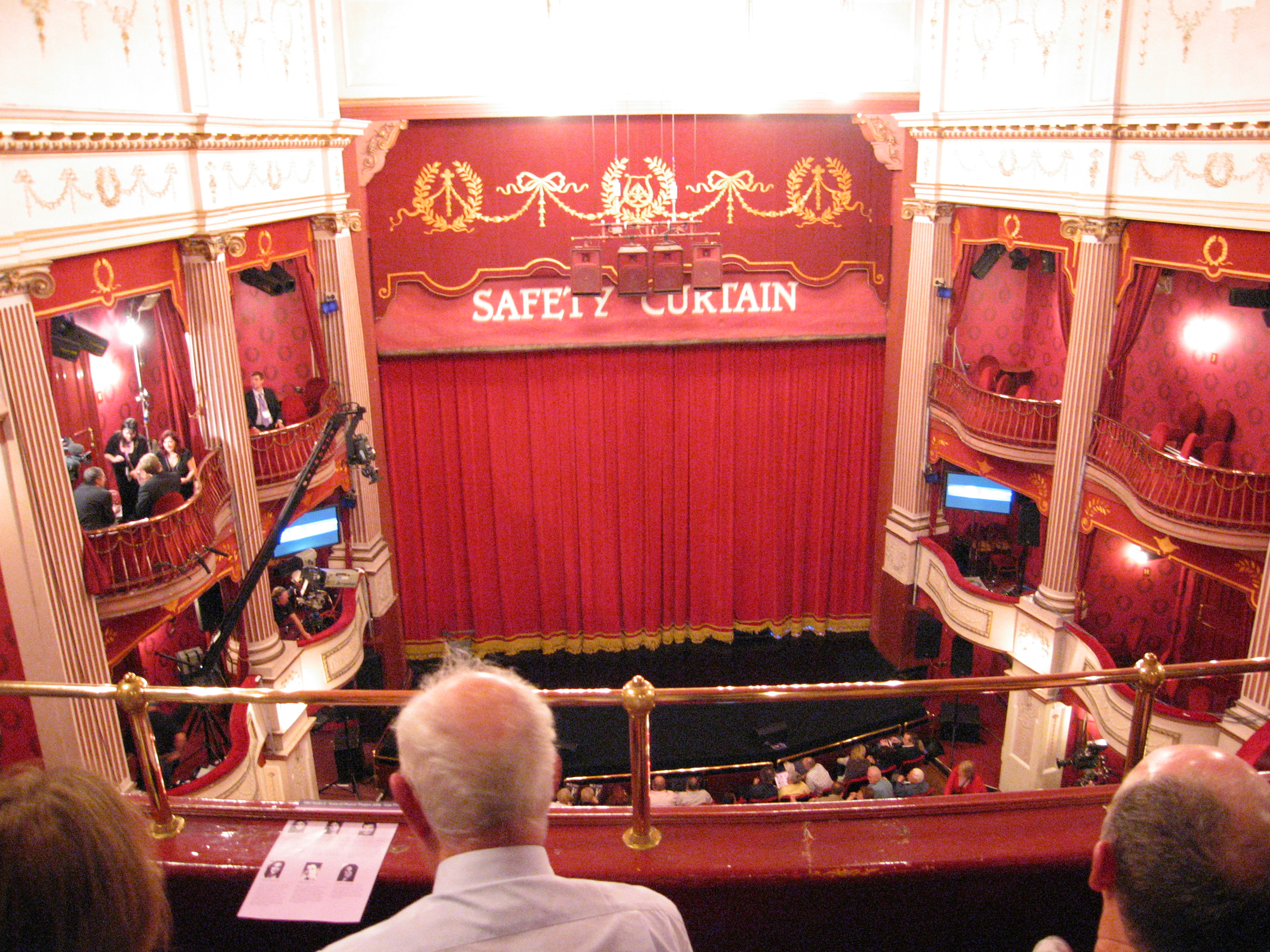
The stage from the balcony and boxes to left and right

Following the COVID-19 pandemic, the theatre re-opened in September 2021, after the longest closure in its history, with a week-long run of Priscilla, Queen of the Desert. The Autumn 2021 season included musicals, drama, concerts and comedy, culminating in the 2021-22 pantomime Aladdin starring Paul Chuckle, Gareth Gates, Gareth Thomas and Mike Doyle which came to an early close on Christmas Eve following a further Covid-related lockdown in Wales. New Theatre re-opened again at the end of January 2022 with the concert A Beautiful Noise, followed by near-capacity performances of musicals The Rocky Horror Show and Hairspray.

== HQ Theatres / Trafalgar Entertainment ==
In 2020, the New Theatre became part of HQ Theatres on a new 25-year lease from Cardiff Council, with all existing staff transferred to the company and significant new investment planned for the theatre. The group then became part of Trafalgar Entertainment who now manage the venue.

Cardiff Councillor Peter Bradbury stated at the time; "I’m delighted that its future has been secured through this agreement with HQ Theatres and Hospitality, one of the UK’s leading theatre operators. This arrangement will see the theatre operated without subsidy".
