= Bath Hotel =

Former hotel in London

General information
- Location: 155 Piccadilly, London, United Kingdom
- Coordinates: 51°30′26″N 0°08′30″W
- Construction started: circa 1789
- Demolished: 1904

The Bath Hotel was located at 155 Piccadilly on the site of what is now The Ritz Hotel, London and was adjacent to the Walsingham House. The Ritz' financial backers began negotiations in 1901 and purchased the Bath in 1902 simultaneously with the acquisition of the Walsingham. One of the considerations that made the transaction appealing to the city was that they would be able to widen Piccadilly when the Walsingham and Bath Hotels were demolished.

== History ==
Located on the corner of Arlington Street and Piccadilly the hotel was in existence no later than the mid-1780s, since John Adams stayed there with his family when he served as the American Minister to Great Britain, starting in 1785. The hotel was located on the site of the original building where the Old White Horse Cellar operated, and offered luxury hotel suites to its clients.

In 1895 the property was offered for sale, indicating that there were profitable rents to be obtained from leaseholds of the booking agent and the wine and spirit retailer on the premises. It is mentioned in the classic novel Little Women by Louisa May Alcott.

The building was demolished in 1904.
