= Marina Theatre =

Theatre and cinema in Lowestoft, Suffolk, England

Marina Theatre Lowestoft
- The Rink Theatre, Marina Cinema, ABC Marina
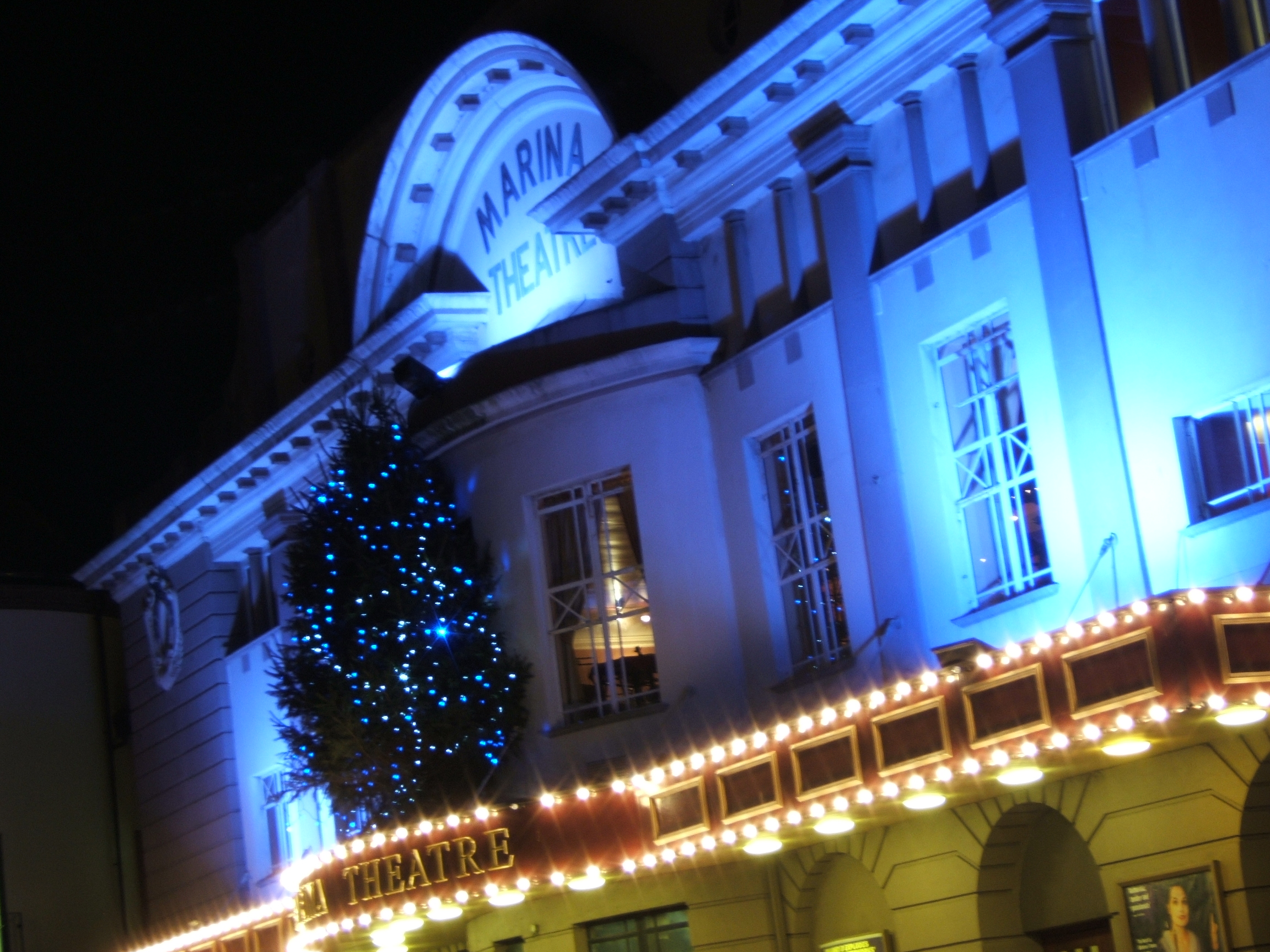
- The Marina Theatre
- Interactive map of Marina Theatre Lowestoft
- Address: The Marina; Lowestoft; England, UK
- Coordinates: 52.47°N 1.75°E
- Owner: Lowestoft Town Council (part)
- Operator: Marina Theatre Trust
- Capacity: 630
- Type: Proscenium
- Current use: Active

Construction
- Opened: 1878
- Closed: 1984-88
- Reopened: 1988
- Rebuilt: 1901 and 1930 refurbished & expanded 2013
- Years active: 1878 – present
- Architects: Ernest Runtz and Co.

Tenants
- Marina Theatre Trust (Theatre & New Cafe/Gallery premises)

Website
- www.marinatheatre.co.uk

The Marina is a theatre and cinema in Lowestoft, Suffolk, originally opened in the Victorian era. The venue has an auditorium seating 630. It plays host to major West End productions, top comedy, orchestral concerts, touring drama and musical productions, opera, ballet, music, dance and celebrity concerts as well as operating a successful cinema operation - boasting the largest screen and cinema auditoria in the town. The Marina annually hosts the largest professional pantomime on the East Anglian Coast.

The Royal Philharmonic Orchestra has been resident at The Marina since 2005 and the theatre has seen performances by acts such as comedians Lee Evans, Michael McIntyre and Sir Ken Dodd as well as Shane Filan of Westlife, Moscow City Ballet, The Russian Ice Stars, Mickey Rooney, Meryl Osmond, Jane MacDonald, Mumford and Sons, Julian Lloyd Webber, Tony Christie, David Essex, Derren Brown and actor William Roache.

== History ==
The Marina began life as a skating rink and was converted to a theatre in 1878 by architect R.F. Brett. In 1901, architect Ernest Runtz was hired to rebuild the theatre, using parts of the existing structure. The Marina was largely rebuilt once again in 1930 by architect Francis Burdett, and re-opened as a cinema by Associated British Cinemas. It was closed in 1984 and eventually purchased by Waveney District Council in 1988. It reopened in October, 1988 almost four years after its closure. It is believed the site was once part of the original Grove Estate and the remodelling in 1901 allowed for a gallery seating area possibly in a horseshoe shape with boxes. The remodelling during 1930 saw the creation of a new dress circle.

The theatre was threatened with closure in 2010 due to financial pressures on the local council. In December 2011 the council handed over management to the newly formed charitable Marina Theatre Trust for a period of 15 years whilst retaining ownership of the building. The Marina Theatre Trust is a registered charity number 1149133 and was formed following a successful tender by the venues award-winning management team. Leading experts from within the theatre industry, local business people and people from the local community form the board of trustees. The Friends Of The Marina Theatre acts as a voluntary support to the venue providing some fundraising and volunteer labour.

The Marina Theatre Trust took over the running of the Marina Theatre on 1 December 2011 and in Summer 2012 oversaw a major refurbishment and renovation of the main auditorium. The much maligned local authority colour scheme of green and brown was replaced with a mixture of blues, grey and gold. Many of the previously covered mouldings and features were revealed and restored. The entire seating was restored and reupholstered in dark blue with several of the cast iron seats being recast to match those thought to be original and some thought to have been rescued from the former Lowestoft Odeon Cinema. Improvements to leg room in the rear stalls were also made and the venue capacity increased to 800 seats. New auditorium carpeting was included within the project. The former 1960s ABC cinema house lights were replaced with Art Deco style chandeliers and fixed lamps. A new lighting position was installed in the roof above the auditorium and digital speakers replaced those previously sited either side of the proscenium. During the refurbishment several mouldings were restored or replaced including those either side of the front stalls. It was found at the time that the theatre is approx one inch lower to the left of the stalls than to the right.

In June 2012 the Trust also secured a lease on three storey premises adjacent to the theatre - once part of the former Cosalt Works, the building had been rebuilt and remodelled in the early 1990s and was occupied by a double glazing companies call centre. The new premises allowed the Marina Theatre to expand its catering facilities substantially with the creation of a new ground floor cafe and gallery and to relocate its box office from the previously cramped theatre foyer. A new community space has since been created on the first floor of the new premises and the venues administrative office has also located to the second floor.

The new cafe and gallery opened at the same time as the refurbished auditorium in September 2013. A successful public appeal enabled the Trust to construct a steel and glass link between the main theatre and new building which opened in November 2012. By obtaining the new premises the venue was also able to construct a new stage access for loading with lorries now able to unload direct to the scenery dock door off Battery Green Rd therefore the previous problem of access for large shows having to come via the front and side entrance has been solved.

In 2013 the Trust substantially upgraded the Cinema from 35mm projection to Digital. A new screen - one of the largest in the region was installed along with new digital Dolby sound. The Marina also commenced live screenings utilising the new equipment in autumn 2013 and now presents live broadcasts of performances including those from the Bolshoi Ballet, National Theatre, Royal Shakespeare Company and Royal Opera House, amongst others. The 35mm projector used from 1988 to 2013 is now on display in the theatre cafe & gallery.

In 2017 the freehold ownership of the Marina Theatre passed from Waveney District Council to the newly formed Lowestoft Town Council. In 2018 The Lowestoft Town Council purchased the three storey building housing the cafe, community room and offices further securing the future for the Theatre's Trust Lease on the building.

In 2025, the Marina Theatre underwent a £3 million redevelopment. The Marina Theatre Project is a Lowestoft Town Council (as building owners) Project, in partnership with the Marina Theatre Trust and East Suffolk Council, with funding from UK Government's Towns Fund. The project saw one of Suffolk's leading venues for theatre, music and comedy be significantly upgraded with the creation of a new theatre entrance within a new link building between the existing Victorian Theatre and the more modern existing box office. The new link building incorporates a lift to give access for all visitors to all floors of the Theatre, new toilets and a relocated and expanded box office facility. The auditorium layout has been redesigned to increase legroom and comfort as well as introducing more accessible seating, this has reduced the theatre's capacity to 630.
