= Everard's Printing Works =

Listed building in Bristol, England

Former Everard's Printing Works
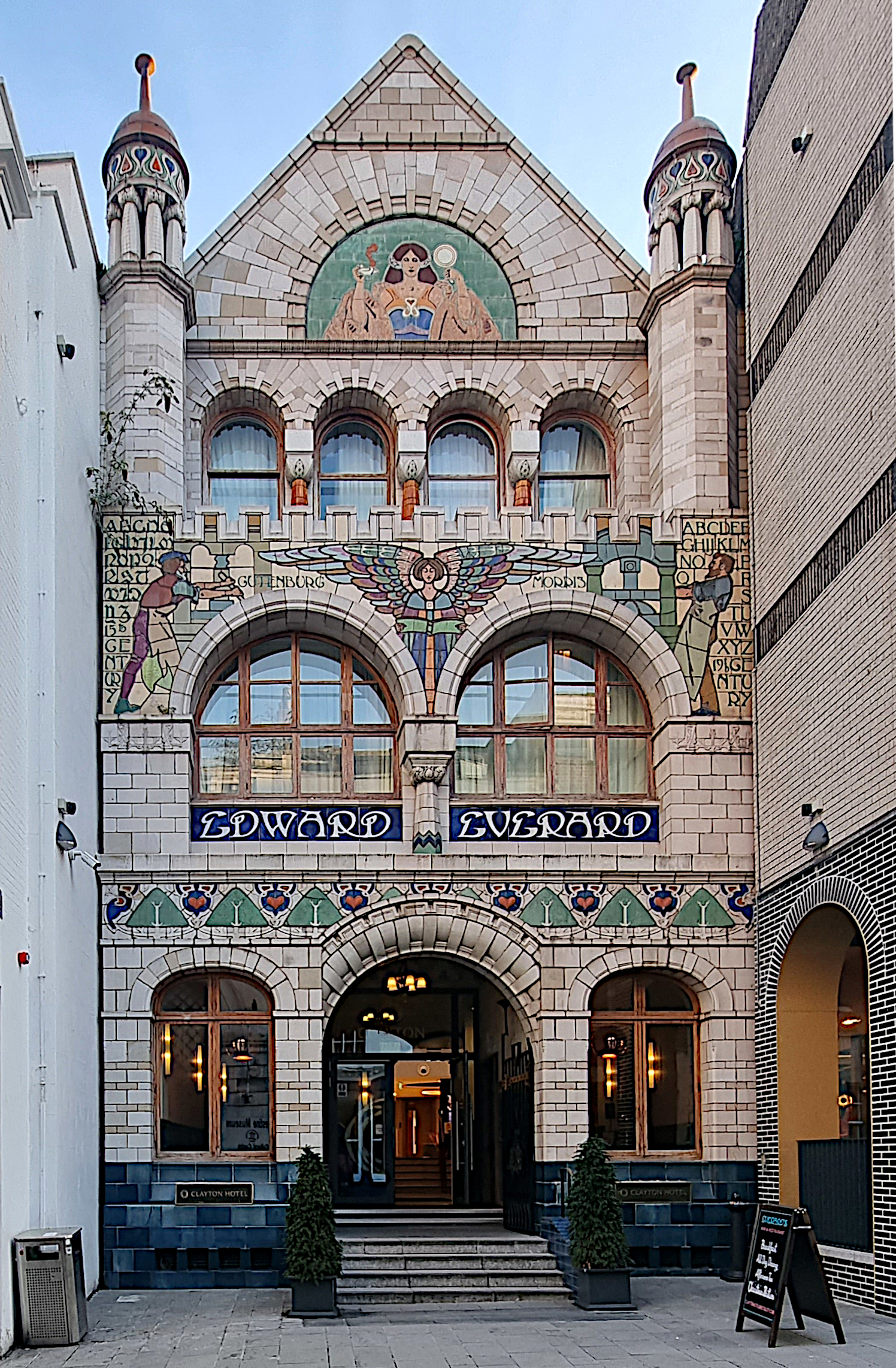
- Everard's Printing Works front facade

- Location within Bristol

General information
- Architectural style: Pre-Raphaelite
- Location: Broad Street, Bristol, England
- Coordinates: 51.45581°N 2.59457°W
- Construction started: 1900
- Completed: 1901
- Client: Edward Everard

Design and construction
- Architect: Henry Williams

Listed Building – Grade II*
- Official name: Former Everard's Printing Works
- Designated: 8 January 1959
- Reference no.: 1281234

The Former Everard's Printing Works is at 37–38 Broad Street in Bristol, England. It has been designated as a Grade II* listed building.

It was built in 1900–01 by Henry Williams, with the Modern Style facade by William James Neatby, who was the chief designer for Doulton and Co., as the main works for the printer Edward Everard. It has a triple archway design on the ground floor with two on the first floor and four on the upper floor. Above them is a female figure holding a lamp and a mirror symbolising Light and Truth. The arches were to reflect the Church of St John the Baptist a little further along Broad Street.

Most of the red brick building was demolished in 1970 but the facade was preserved, as it is the largest decorative Doulton Carrara ware tile facade of its kind in Britain (so named from its resemblance to Carrara marble). The contributions of William Morris and Johannes Gutenberg to printing and literature are celebrated in the design. Behind each figure are typefaces representing their work. After the demolition of the rest of the building, the facade was incorporated into a new building which was used as offices by the NatWest bank. It was later converted to be the Clayton Hotel, which opened in 2022.

== See also ==
- Grade II* listed buildings in Bristol
