= Walsingham House =

Former hotel in London

- The hotel circa 1896
- Interactive map of the Walsingham House area

General information
- Location: 150-154 Piccadilly, London, United Kingdom
- Coordinates: 51°30′26″N 0°08′30″W
- Construction started: 1887
- Demolished: 1904

The Walsingham House or Walsingham House Hotel was located at 150-4 Piccadilly on the site of what is now The Ritz Hotel, London and was adjacent to the Bath Hotel. The Ritz's financial backers began negotiations in 1901 and purchased the Walsingham simultaneously with the Bath Hotel. Though the Walsingham was of fairly new construction, they determined it was too "inelegant" and demolished the building. One of the considerations that made the transaction appealing to the city was that they would be able to widen Piccadilly when the Walsingham and Bath Hotels were demolished.

== History ==
An 1869-1874 map of the area showed the Bath Hotel on the corner of Arlington Street and next to it a string of small businesses—a coach builder, coal merchant, stationer and Cockburn's spirits. These were purchased in 1886 and demolished by Lord Walsingham to create the Walsingham House, luxury residential mansion flats, fully staffed and with restaurant facilities. Lord Walsingham had the lavish accommodations built in 1887, by the architect C W Stephens. The eight-storey, red-brick building, designed by Alfred Burr, featured flats which accommodated six bedrooms with en-suite bathrooms, each containing 12,323sq ft of living space. The construction was completed in 1888. Around the turn of the century, the residential mansion-flat concept was transitioned to smaller hotel suites.

A decoration of a room at Walsingham House 1897.

One of its early residents was Benoît-Constant Coquelin who carried on correspondence with Henry Irving and Lillie Langtry from his residence there. In 1898, the hotel opened a new dining room which was in the house which the Isthmian Club operated for many years at 105 Piccadilly. Lord Walsingham hired artist Cesare Formilli to complete the decoration of the new dining room, based upon designs that had been presented the previous year at the Paris Salon. Formilli selected the interior furnishings specifically for the room and surrounded it with columns featuring bas-reliefs of dancing girls. On the walls and ceilings were nine frescos, featuring hunting and fishing scenes.

According to the tax record description of the property, it was composed of two blocks of buildings, one fronting Piccadilly and the other fronting Arlington. There were two separate entrances and 1/10th of the building was occupied by Lord Walsingham and his servants as a private residence. The remaining building consisted of Block A on Piccadilly and Block B on Arlington, which shared between them staircases and elevators. Block A contained six stories with an attic above. Each floor was accessed by a front staircase for residents and guests and a servant's staircase. On each landing were corridors from where one gained access to the chambers. Each suite featured an entry room, so that the private living chambers were not exposed to anyone entering the unit. The floor arrangement was: 1st floor 8 bedrooms and 9 strong rooms divided amongst 6 chambers, 2nd floor 8 chambers each with a single bedroom and strong room, 3rd floor 10 chambers, 4th floor 12 chambers, 5th floor 10 chambers and 6th floor 9 chambers (6 of which were used as servants' bedrooms). Block B on Arlington was smaller and had 3 chambers on each of four floors and on the fifth floor, 2 bedrooms for servants.

The building was demolished in 1904 to make way for the Ritz Hotel.
