= 36–38 Queen Anne's Gate =

Building in London, England

Coordinates: 51.500674°N 0.134069°W

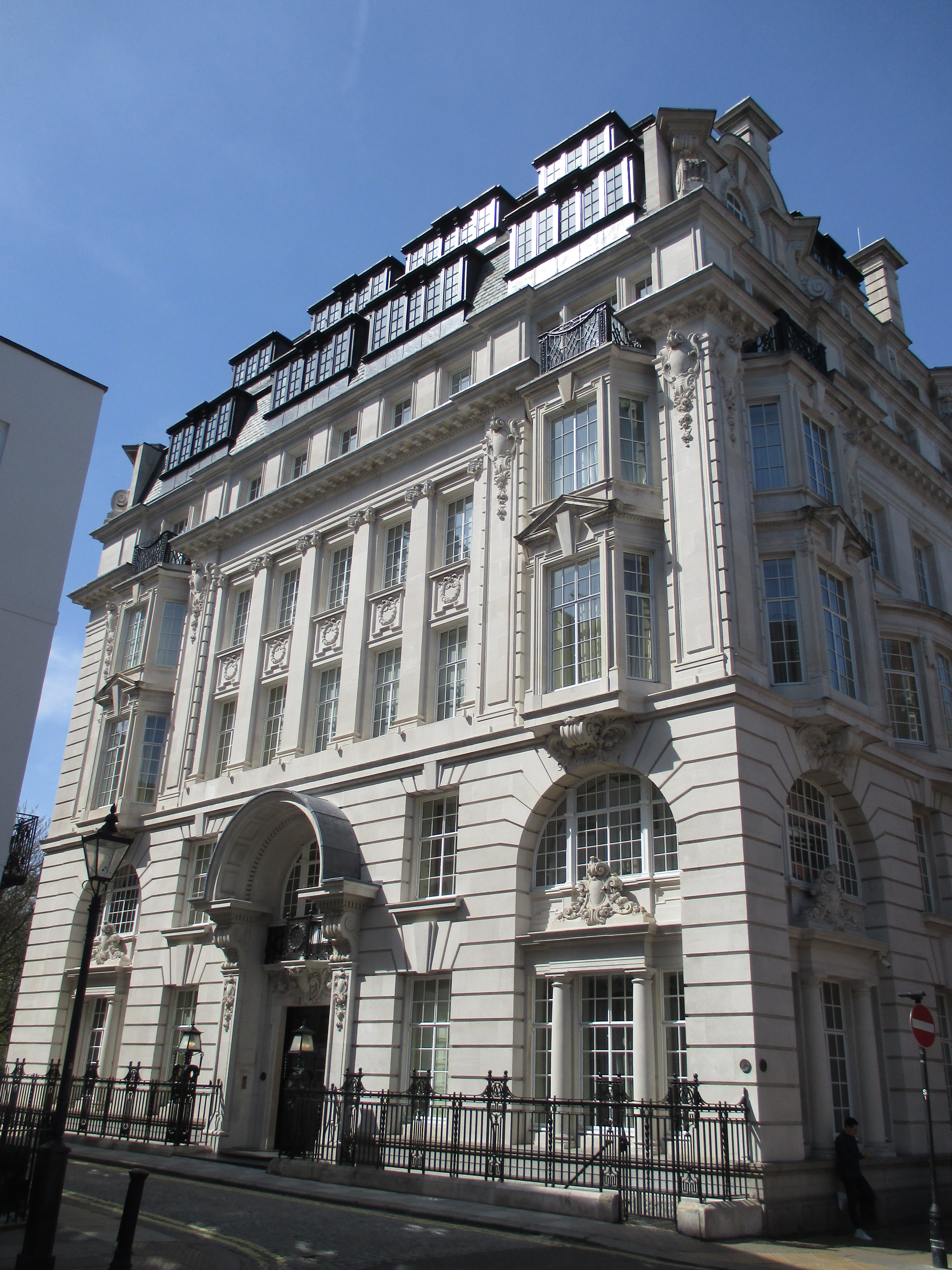
36–38 Queen Anne's Gate

36–38 Queen Anne's Gate or Falcon House is an Edwardian office block that stands in Queen Anne's Gate in London.

== History ==
The building was formerly occupied by houses similar in style to the rest of the street. These were replaced by a Victorian mansion which was in turn replaced with the current building. The offices were built for the Anglo-American Oil Company, an arm of Standard Oil which would later be acquired by Esso. It was designed by Ernest Runtz and built between 1908 and 1910. The offices were in use by the National Trust whose headquarters were located in the properties nearby on Queen Anne's Gate for some years.

== Architecture ==
The buildings are built of Portland stone in an Edwardian Baroque style. The architecture and scale place them in contrast with the character of much of the rest of the square which are some of the best preserved Queen Anne style houses within London.
