= 162–165 Piccadilly =

Edwardian former office building in London

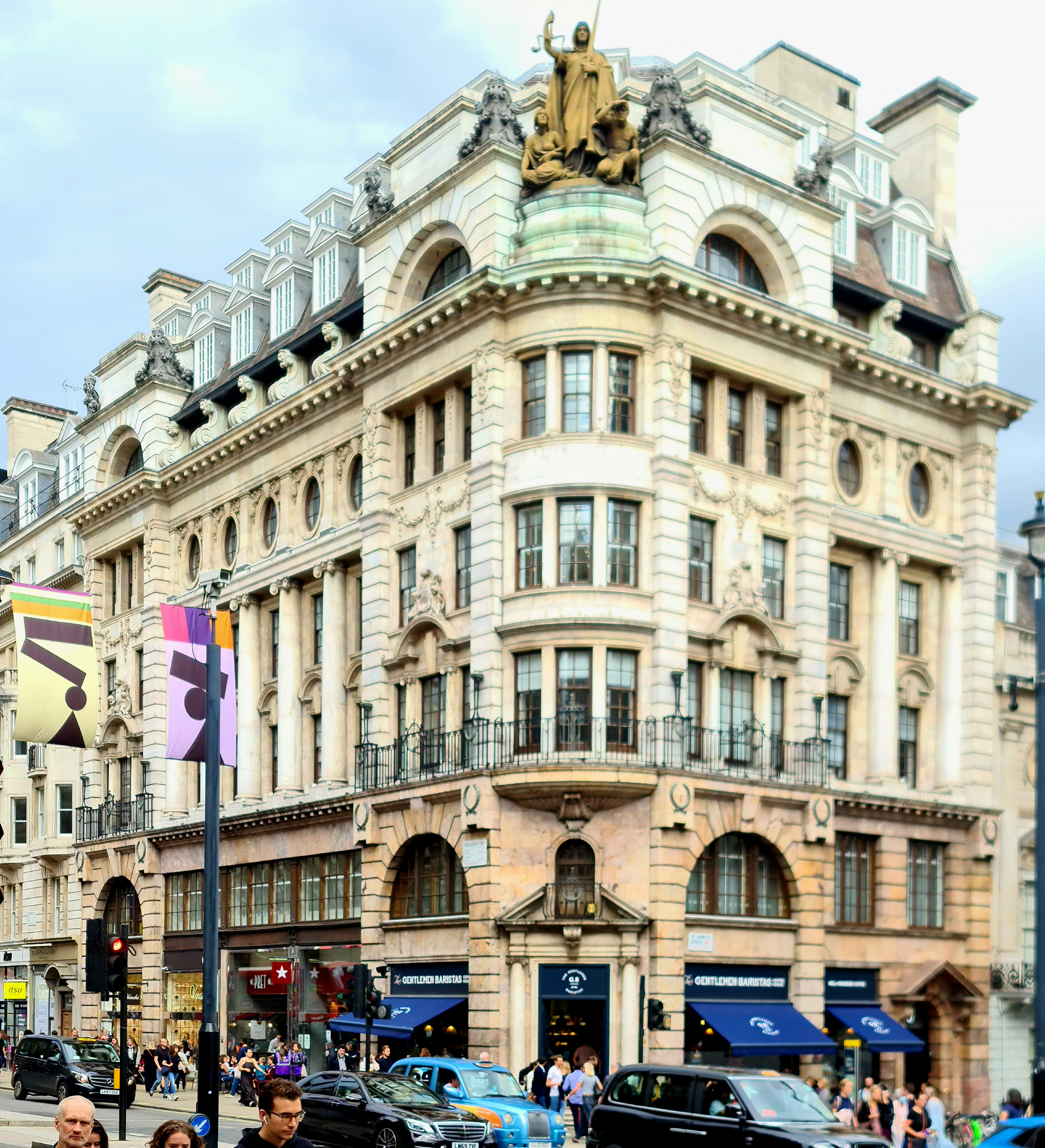
- 162–165 Piccadilly

General information
- Type: Office
- Architectural style: Edwardian baroque
- Location: London, England
- Coordinates: 51°30′28″N 0°08′24″W
- Completed: 1909

Design and construction
- Architects: Runtz & Ford

Listed Building – Grade II
- Official name: 162-165, PICCADILLY W1, 39, ST JAMES'S STREET SW1
- Designated: 30 May 1972
- Reference no.: 1226543

162–165 Piccadilly sometimes called the Norwich Union Building is an Edwardian office block that stands on the corner of Piccadilly and St James's Street in the St James's district of London. It was awarded Grade II listed status in 1972.

== History ==
The building was constructed between 1907 and 1909 for the Norwich Union. It was intended to house their West End branch along with providing space for shops as well as offices or a gentleman's club to be accommodated in the upper floors. It was designed by Runtz & Ford.

== Design ==
The buildings employ an Edwardian baroque style, with a ground floor of Welsh jasper and upper levels of Pentelic and Cipollino marble. A bronze arrangement of Justice by Hibbert Charles Binney adorns the corner.

The building has been described as uncontrolled in its composition, and criticised for its design. Its decorated facades are inadequately paired with a discipline of arrangement. Francis Sheppard in the Survey of London was particularly particularly scathing, writing that its design "completely travesties the late Baroque manner of Richard Norman Shaw".
