= Old White Horse Cellar =

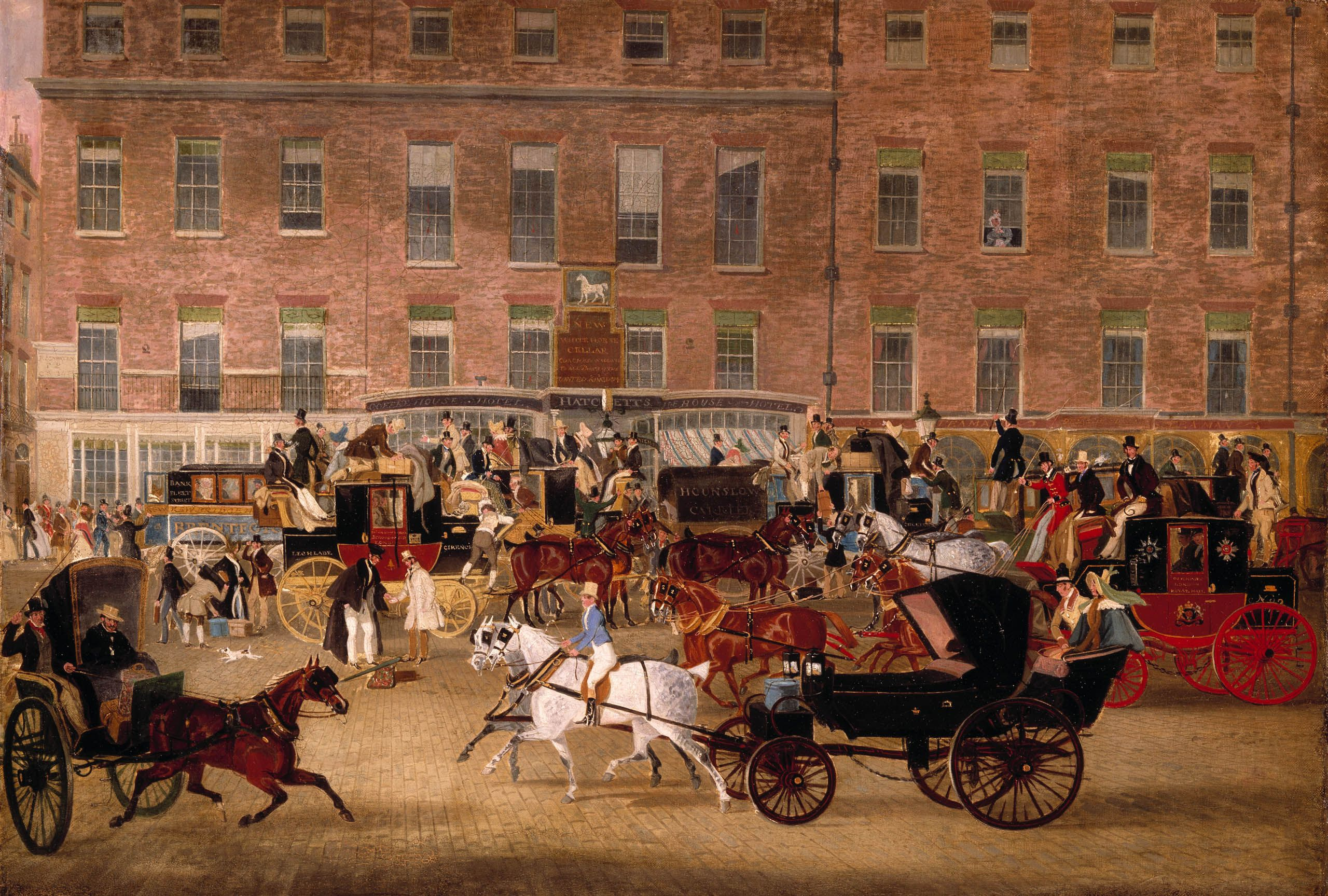
- The White Horse Cellar, Piccadilly by James Pollard
- Interactive map of the Old White Horse Cellar area

General information
- Location: 155 Piccadilly, London, England
- Coordinates: 51°30′26″N 0°08′30″W
- Construction started: 1720
- Demolished: 1884

The Old White Horse Cellar (also known as Hatchetts White Horse Cellar) at No. 155 Piccadilly was one of the best-known coaching inns in England during the 18th and 19th centuries. The first mention of the White Horse Cellar is in 1720. It was originally located on the corner of Arlington Street, where the Ritz Hotel is now located. The first landlord, a man named Williams, named it in honor of the newly established House of Hanover, whose heraldic emblem featured a white horse. The White Horse rose to prominence under Abraham Hatchett who later moved it to the opposite side of the road on the corner of Albemarle Street, where it was known as "Hatchett’s Hotel and White Horse Cellar". The precise date of the move is not known, but was precipitated by the construction of the Bath Hotel, which was located on the corner of Piccadilly and Arlington as early as 1798. It was torn down in 1884 to make room for the Albemarle.

In its heyday, the White Horse Cellar was the starting terminus for all western-bound mail coaches from London. Mail bound for Bath and Bristol left the White Horse each night. It had a "travellers' room", a sort of waiting room for travellers to rest and wait for another coach. The room had a fireplace, partitioned sleeping cubbyholes, a clock, a mirror and a waiter who would serve food from the kitchen. But the real draw was the cellar, where people gathered to gossip, discuss the news and share a drink.

Hatchett apparently moved out before the building was demolished, as in 1848 "Hatchett's Hotel and New White Horse Cellar" was operating at 67 & 68 Piccadilly. Mention was made by Edward Mogg in 1838 that both the Old White Horse Cellar and the New White Horse Cellar remained standing nearly opposite each other on Piccadilly. In the 1920s Hatchett published a history of the establishment, Old Coaching Days and the White Horse Cellar Piccadilly established A D 1720.
