= Piccadilly =

Road in the City of Westminster, London

Coordinates: 51°30′25″N 0°08′32″W

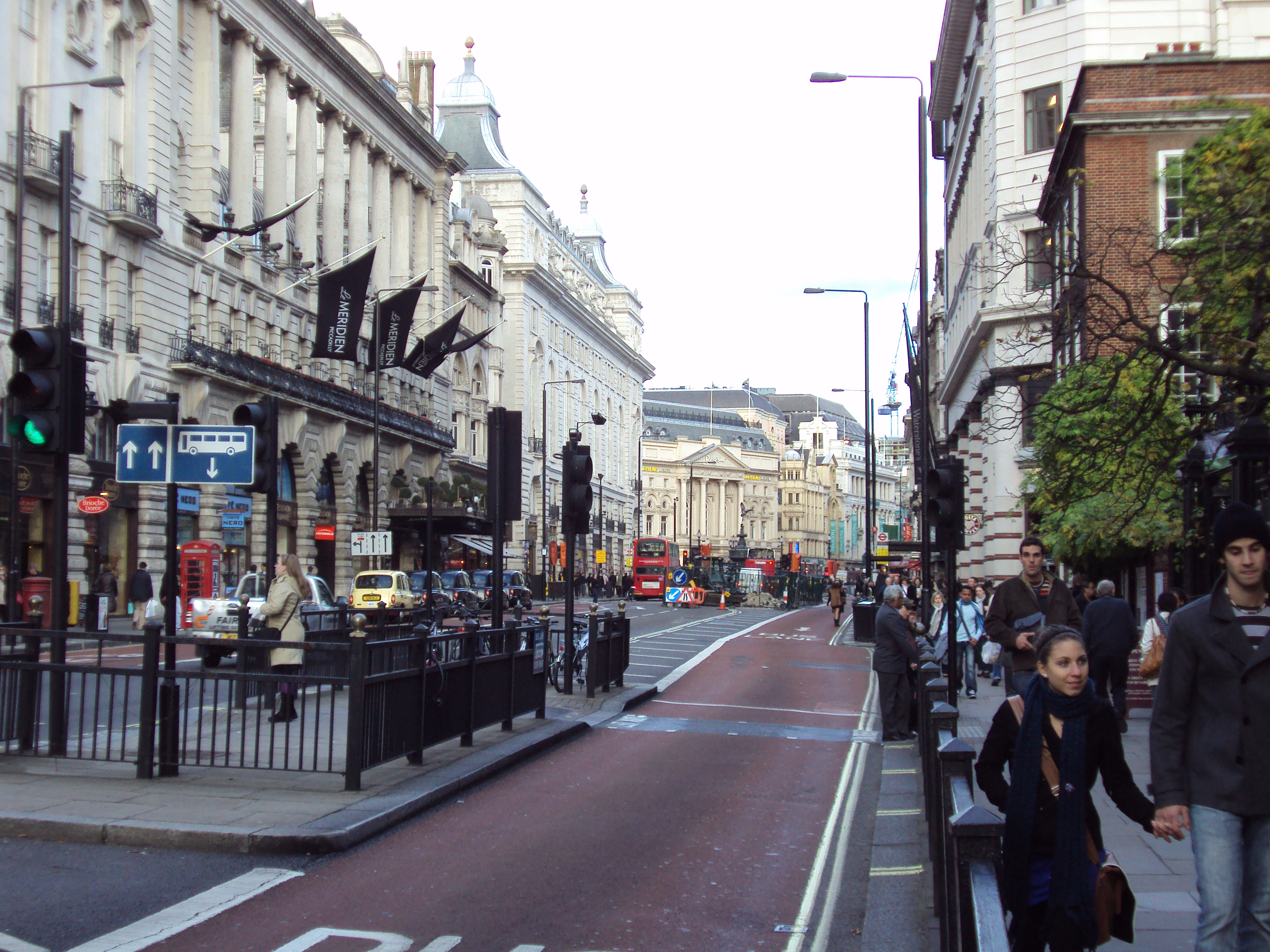
View of Piccadilly and The Dilly hotel (on the left), looking towards Piccadilly Circus, 2009.

Piccadilly (/ˌpɪkəˈdɪli/) is a road in the City of Westminster, London, England, to the south of Mayfair, between Hyde Park Corner in the west and Piccadilly Circus in the east. It is part of the A4 road that connects central London to Hammersmith, Earl's Court, Heathrow Airport and the M4 motorway westward. St James's is to the south of the eastern section, while the western section is built up only on the northern side. Piccadilly is just under 1 mile (1.6 km) in length, and it is one of the widest and straightest streets in central London.

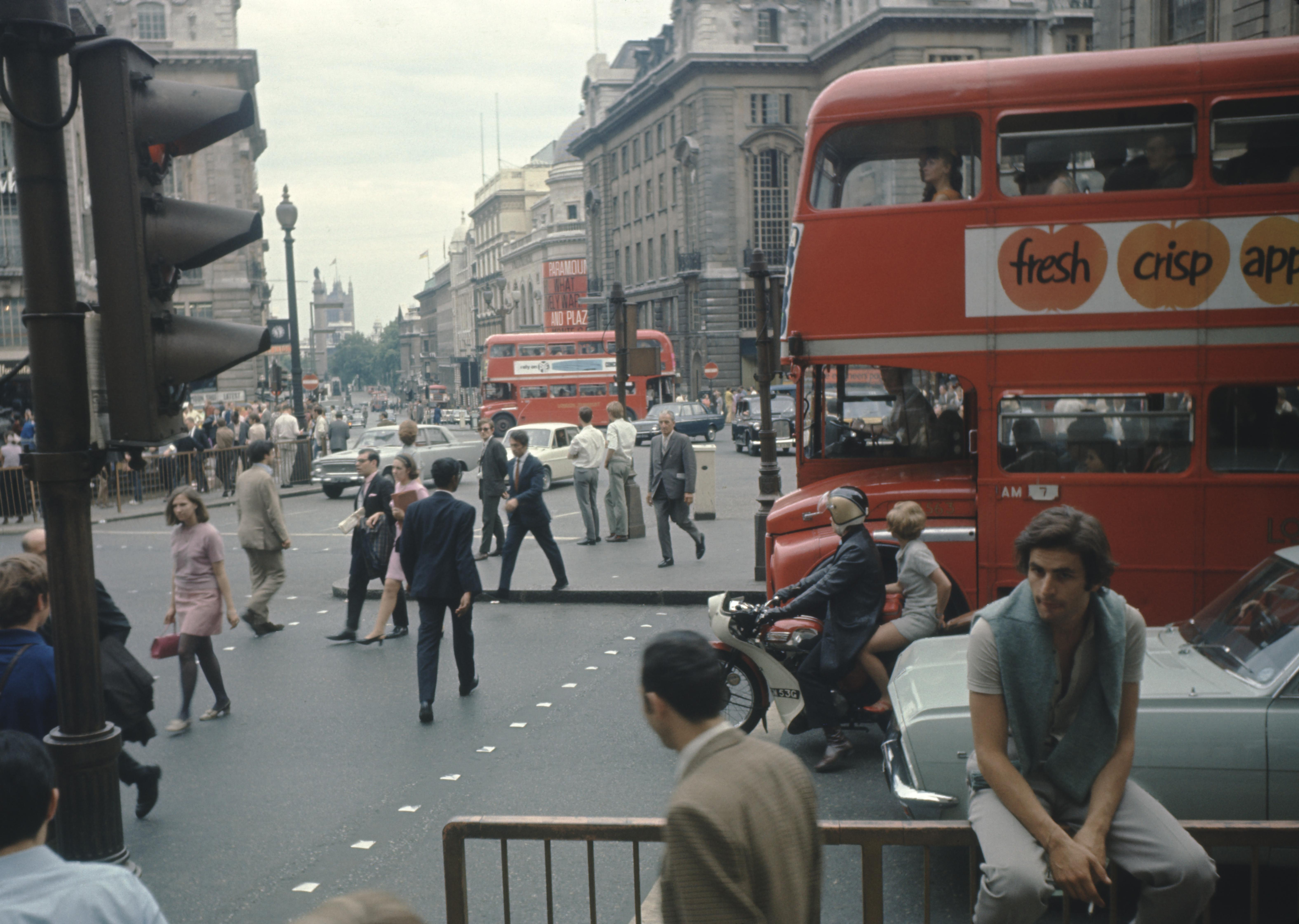
Piccadilly Circus in 1970, looking down lower Regent Street to the Duke of York Column and Victoria Tower.

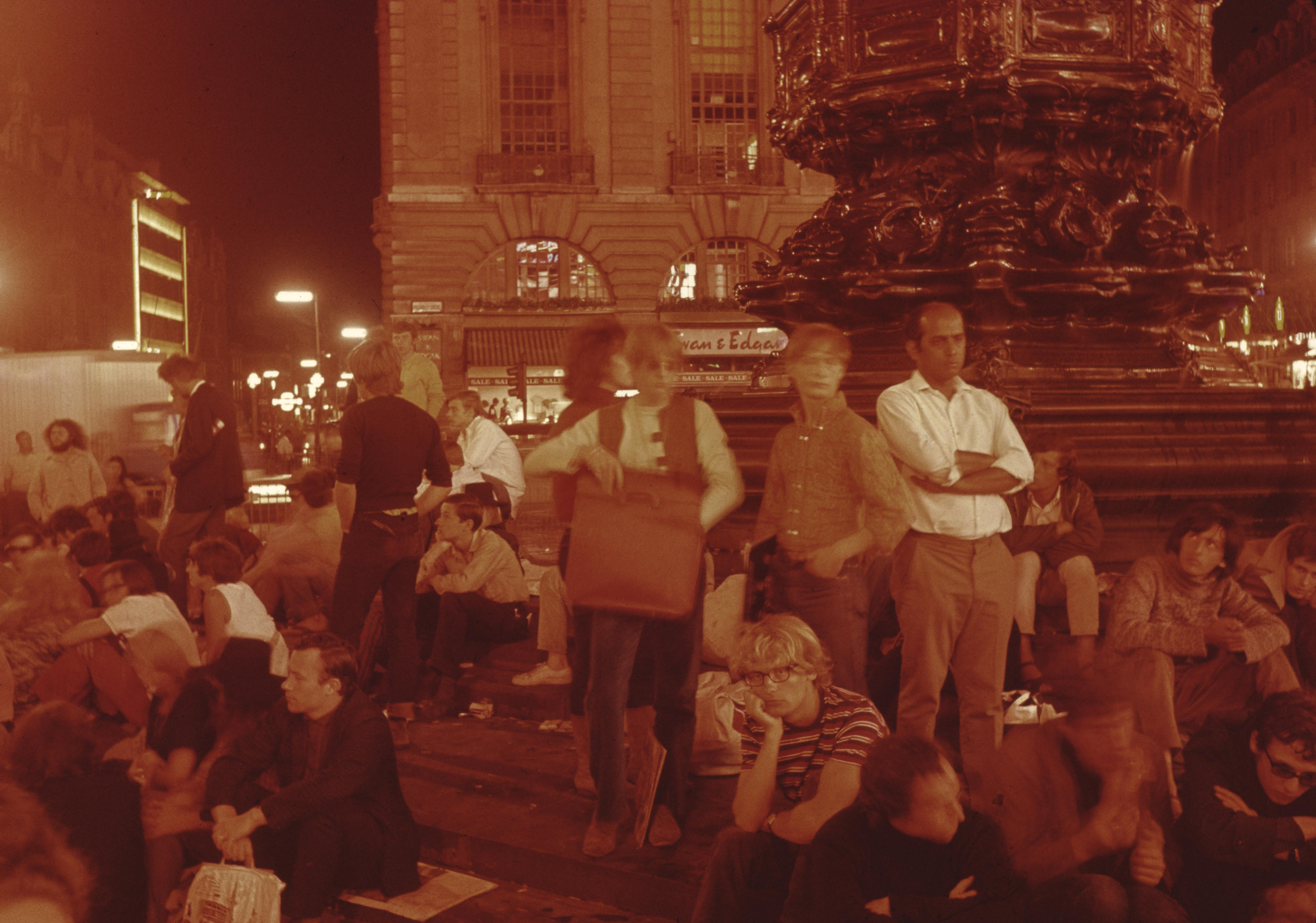
Piccadilly Circus at night, 1970.

The street has been a main thoroughfare since at least medieval times, and in the Middle Ages was known as "the road to Reading" or "the way from Colnbrook". Around 1611 or 1612, Robert Baker acquired land in the area, and prospered by making and selling piccadills. Shortly after purchasing the land, he enclosed it and erected several dwellings, including his home, Pikadilly Hall. What is now Piccadilly was named Portugal Street in 1663 after Catherine of Braganza, wife of Charles II, and grew in importance after the road from Charing Cross to Hyde Park Corner was closed to allow the creation of Green Park in 1668. Some of the most notable stately houses in London were built on the northern side of the street during this period, including Clarendon House and Burlington House in 1664. Berkeley House, constructed around the same time as Clarendon House, was destroyed by a fire in 1733 and rebuilt as Devonshire House in 1737 by William Cavendish, 3rd Duke of Devonshire. It was later used as the main headquarters for the Whig party. Burlington House has since been home to several noted societies, including the Royal Academy of Arts, the Geological Society of London, the Linnean Society, and the Royal Astronomical Society. Several members of the Rothschild family had mansions at the western end of the street. St James's Church was consecrated in 1684 and the surrounding area became St James Parish.

The Old White Horse Cellar, at No. 155, was one of the most famous coaching inns in England by the late 18th century, by which time the street had become a favoured location for booksellers. The Bath Hotel emerged around 1790, and Walsingham House was built in 1887. Both the Bath and the Walsingham were purchased and demolished, and the prestigious Ritz Hotel built on their site in 1906. Piccadilly Circus station, at the east end of the street, was opened in 1906 and rebuilt to designs by Charles Holden between 1925 and 1928. The clothing store Simpson's was established at Nos. 203–206 Piccadilly by Alec Simpson in 1936. During the 20th century, Piccadilly became known as a place to acquire heroin, and was notorious in the 1960s as the centre of London's illegal drug trade. Today, it is regarded as one of London's principal shopping streets. Its landmarks include the Ritz, Park Lane, Athenaeum and Intercontinental hotels, Fortnum & Mason, the Royal Academy, the RAF Club, Hatchards, the Embassy of Japan and the High Commission of Malta.

== History ==
=== Early history ===
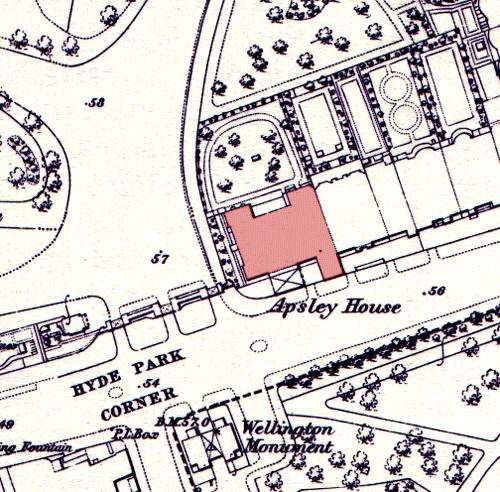
Apsley House on an 1869 map. The neighbouring houses were demolished in the early 1960s to allow Park Lane to be widened. The Wellington Arch has been moved since this time.

The street has been part of a main road for centuries, although there is no evidence that it was part of a Roman road, unlike Oxford Street further north. In the Middle Ages it was known as "the road to Reading" or "the way from Colnbrook". During the Tudor period, relatively settled conditions made expansion beyond London's city walls a safer venture. Property speculation became a lucrative enterprise, and developments grew so rapidly that the threat of disease and disorder prompted the government to ban developments. Owing to the momentum of growth, the laws had little real effect.

A plot of land bounded by Coventry, Sherwood, Glasshouse and Rupert streets and the line of Smith's Court was granted by Elizabeth I to William Dodington, a gentleman of London, in 1559–60. A year or so later it was owned by a brewer, Thomas Wilson of St Botolph-without-Aldgate. The grant did not include a small parcel of land, 1 3/8 acres in area, on the east of what is now Great Windmill Street. That plot may have never belonged to the Crown, and was owned by Anthony Cotton in the reign of Henry VIII. John Cotton granted it to John Golightly in 1547, and his descendants sold it to a tailor, Robert Baker, in c. 1611–12. Six or seven years later, Baker bought 22 acres of Wilson's land, thanks largely to money from his second marriage. (Note: His second wife was Mary, daughter of Samuel Higgins, an apothecary.)

Baker became financially successful by making and selling fashionable piccadills. Shortly after purchasing the land, he enclosed it (the parishioners had Lammas grazing rights) and erected several dwellings, including a residence and shop for himself; within two years his house was known as Pickadilly Hall. (Note: Piccadilly has also been described as a variation of the old Dutch word "Pickedillikens", meaning the extreme or utmost part of something.) A map published by Faithorne in 1658 describes the street as "the way from Knightsbridge to Piccadilly Hall". A nearby gaming house, known as Shaver's Hall and nicknamed "Tart Hall" or "Pickadell Hall", was popular with the gentry of London. Lord Dell lost £3,000 gambling at cards there in 1641.

After Robert Baker's death in 1623 and the death of his eldest son Samuel shortly afterward, his widow and her father purchased the wardship of their surviving children; the death of the next eldest son, Robert in 1630 allowed them to effectively control the estate. Their only daughter died, and her widower Sir Henry Oxenden retained an interest in the land. Several relatives claimed it, (Note: Edward Hobart, Robert's son-in-law, and a man claiming to be a great-nephew, John Baker, of Wellington, Somerset, or Payhembury, Devon.) but after Mary Baker's death in about 1665, the estate reverted to the Crown. A great-nephew, John Baker, obtained possession of part of it, but squabbled over the lands with his cousin, James Baker; trying to play one another off, they paid or granted rights to Oxenden and a speculator, Colonel Thomas Panton, eventually losing out to them. By the 1670s, Panton was developing the lands; despite the claims of some distantly related Bakers, he steadily built them up.

=== Later 17th century ===
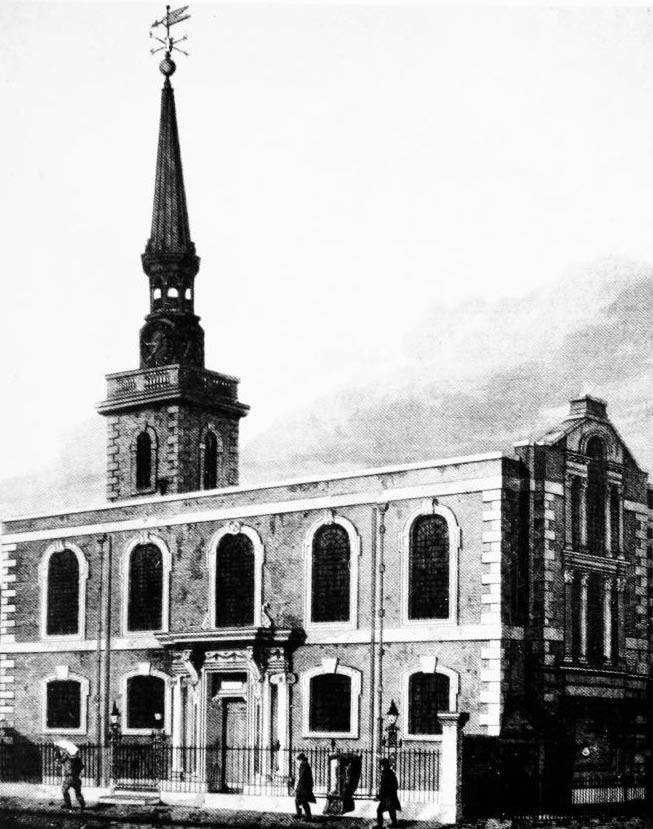
St James's Church has stood on Piccadilly since 1684, and was designed by Sir Christopher Wren

Piccadilly was named Portugal Street in 1663 after Catherine of Braganza, wife of Charles II. Its importance to traffic increased after an earlier road from Charing Cross to Hyde Park Corner was closed to allow the creation of Green Park in 1668. After the restoration of the English monarchy in 1660, Charles II encouraged the development of Portugal Street and the area to the north (Mayfair), and they became fashionable residential localities. Some of the grandest mansions in London were built on the northern side of the street. Edward Hyde, 1st Earl of Clarendon and close political adviser to the king, purchased land for a house; Clarendon House (now the location of Albemarle Street) was built in 1664, and the earl sold the surplus land partly to Sir John Denham, who built what later became Burlington House. Denham chose the location because it was on the outskirts of London surrounded by fields. The house was first used to house the poor, before being reconstructed by the third Earl of Burlington in 1718. Berkeley House was constructed around the same time as Clarendon House. It was destroyed by a fire in 1733, and rebuilt as Devonshire House in 1737 by William Cavendish, 3rd Duke of Devonshire, and was subsequently used as the headquarters for the Whig party. Devonshire House survived until 1921, before being sold for redevelopment by Edward Cavendish, 10th Duke of Devonshire for £1 million. Burlington House has since been home to the Royal Academy of Arts, the Geological Society of London, the Linnean Society of London, the Royal Astronomical Society, the British Astronomical Association, the Society of Antiquaries of London and the Royal Society of Chemistry.

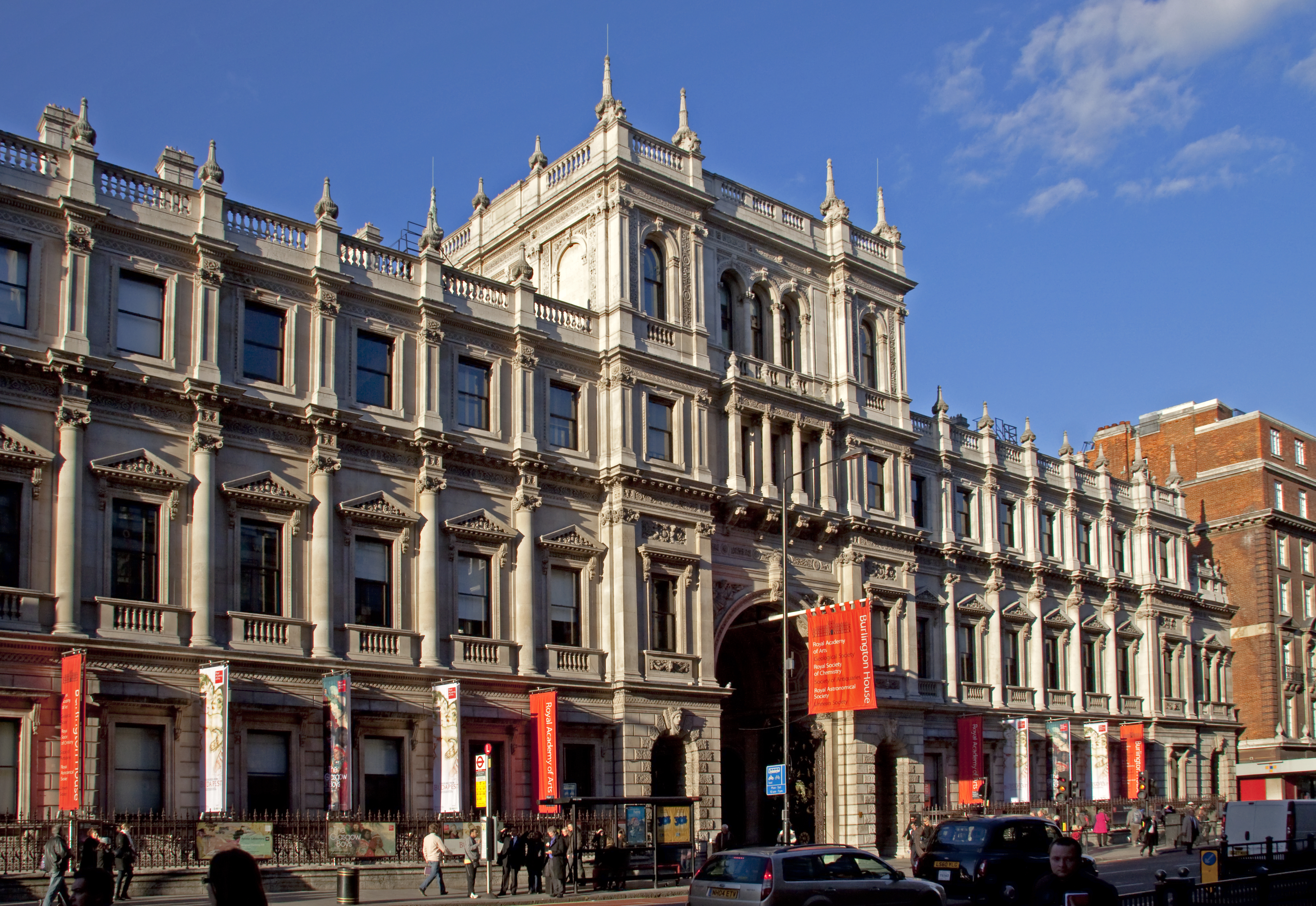
Burlington House, home to several learned societies

The land to the south of Piccadilly was leased to trustees of the Earl of St Albans in 1661 for a thirty-year term, subsequently extended to 1740. Nos. 162–165 were granted freehold by the king to Sir Edward Villiers in 1674. The White Bear Inn had been established between what is now No. 221 Piccadilly and the parallel Jermyn Street since 1685. It remained in use throughout the 18th century before being demolished in 1870 to make way for a restaurant.

St James's Church was first proposed in 1664, when residents wanted the area to become a separate parish from St Martin in the Fields. After several Bill readings, construction began in 1676. The building was designed by Christopher Wren and cost around £5,000. It was consecrated in 1684, when the surrounding area became St James Parish.

By 1680, most of the original residential properties along Portugal Street had been demolished or built over. The name Piccadilly was applied to part of the street east of Swallow Street by 1673, and eventually became the de facto name for the entire length of Portugal Street. A plan of the area around St James Parish in 1720 describes the road as "Portugal Street aka Piccadilly". John Rocque's Map of London, published in 1746, refers to the entire street as Piccadilly. (Note: The street was officially known as Portugal Street until c. 1750.)

=== 18th–19th centuries ===
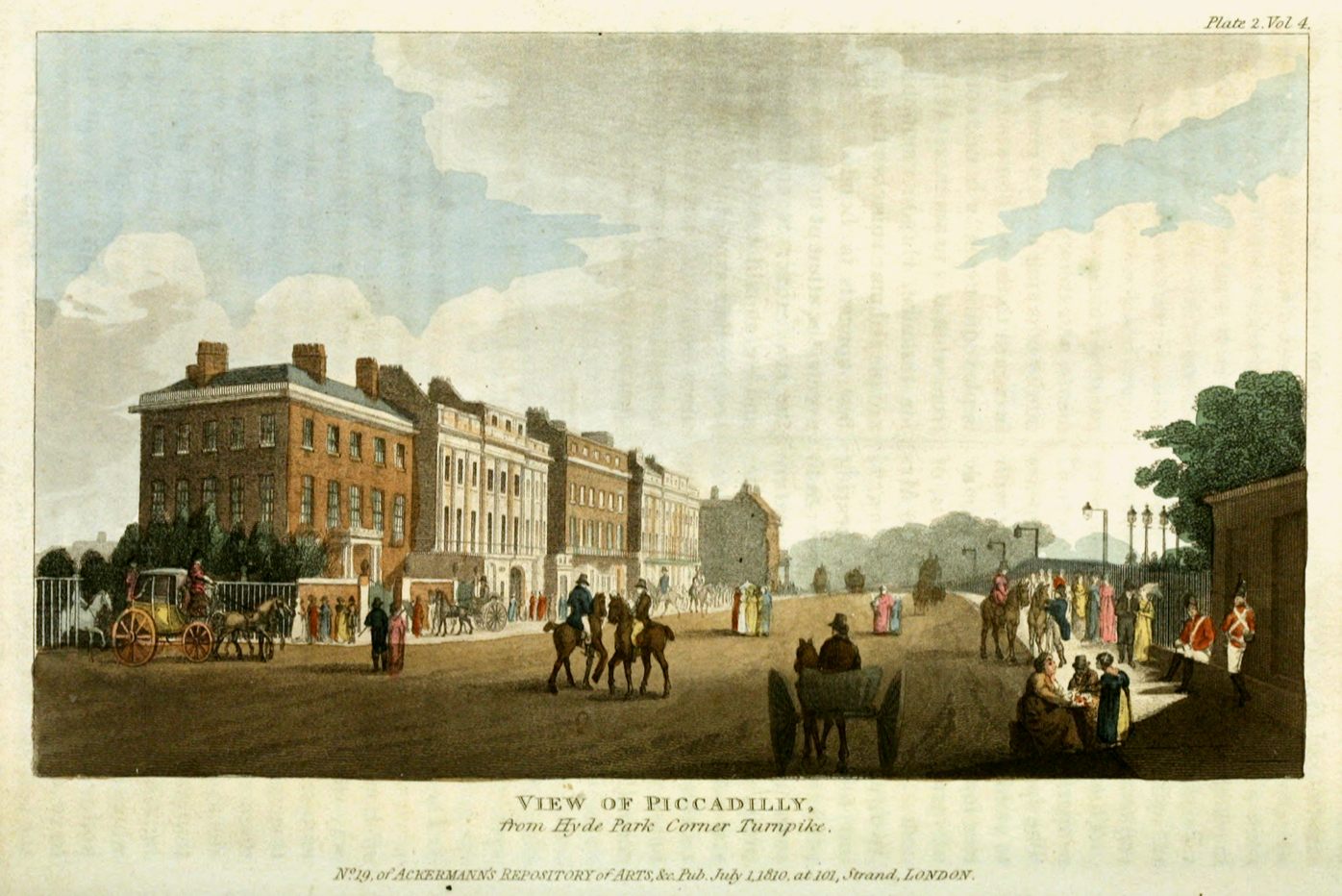
The view of Piccadilly from Hyde Park Corner in 1810

Piccadilly was increasingly developed, and by the middle of the 18th century it was continuously built on as far as Hyde Park Corner. The development of St James's and Mayfair, in particular, made Piccadilly one of the busiest roads in London. Hugh Mason and William Fortnum started the Fortnum & Mason partnership on Piccadilly in 1705, selling recycled candles from Buckingham Palace. By 1788, the store sold poultry, potted meats, lobsters and prawns, savoury patties, Scotch eggs, and fresh and dried fruits.

The street acquired a reputation for numerous inns and bars during this period. The Old White Horse Cellar, at No. 155, was one of the most famous coaching inns in England but was later destroyed. The Black Bear and White Bear (originally the Fleece) public houses were nearly opposite each other, although the former was demolished in about 1820. Also of note were the Hercules' Pillars, just west of Hamilton Place, the Triumphant Car, which was popular with soldiers, and the White Horse and Half Moon. The Bath Hotel emerged around 1790 and Walsingham House was built in 1887. The Bath and the Walsingham were demolished when the Ritz Hotel opened on the site in 1906.

No. 106, on the corner of Piccadilly and Brick Street, was built for Hugh Hunlock in 1761. It was subsequently owned by the 6th Earl of Coventry who remodelled it around 1765; most of the architecture from this renovation has survived. In 1869, it became home to the St James's Club, a gentleman's club that remained there until 1978. The building is now the London campus of the Limkokwing University of Creative Technology.

Several members of the Rothschild family had mansions at the western end of the street. Nathan Mayer Rothschild moved his banking premises to No. 107 in 1825, and the construction of other large buildings, complete with ballrooms and marble staircases, led to the street being colloquially referred to as Rothschild Row. Ferdinand James von Rothschild lived at No. 143 with his wife Evelina while Lionel de Rothschild lived at No. 148. Melbourne House was designed by William Chambers for Peniston Lamb, 1st Viscount Melbourne and built between 1770 and 1774. It was converted to apartments in 1802, and is now the Albany. The house has been the residence for the British Prime Ministers William Ewart Gladstone and Edward Heath. St James's Hall was designed by Owen Jones and built between 1857 and 1858. Charles Dickens gave several readings of his novels in the hall, including Great Expectations and Oliver Twist. The hall hosted performances from Antonín Dvořák, Edvard Grieg and Pyotr Ilyich Tchaikovsky. It was demolished in 1905, and replaced by the Piccadilly Hotel.

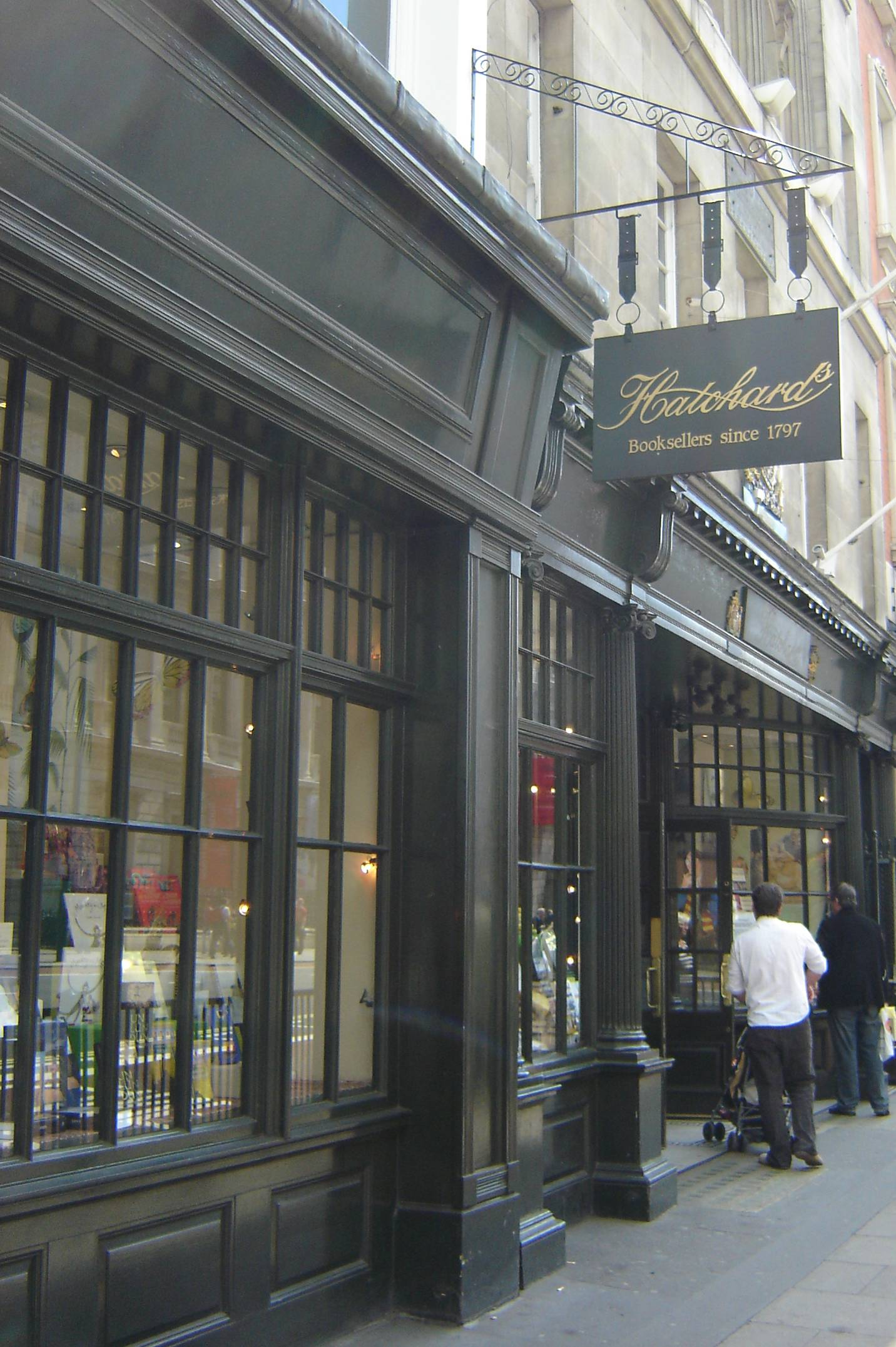
The bookseller Hatchards has been based on Piccadilly since 1797, occupying the current premises at what is now No. 187 in 1801

In the late 18th century, Piccadilly was a favoured place for booksellers. In 1765, John Almon opened a shop in No. 178, which was frequented by Lord Temple and other Whigs. John Stockdale opened a shop on No. 181 in 1781. The business continued after his death in 1810, and was run by his family until 1835. Hatchards, now the oldest surviving bookshop in Britain, was started by John Hatchard at No. 173 in 1797; it moved to the current location at No. 189–190 (now No. 187) in 1801. Aldine Press moved to Piccadilly from Chancery Lane in 1842, and remained there until 1894.

The Egyptian Hall at No. 170, designed in 1812 by P. F. Robinson for W. Bullock of Liverpool, was modelled on Ancient Egyptian architecture, particularly the Great Temple of Dendera (Tentyra). One author described it as "one of the strangest places Piccadilly ever knew". It was a venue for exhibitions by the Society of Painters in Water Colours and the Society of Female Artists during the 19th century. It contained numerous Egyptian antiquaries; at an auction in June 1822, two "imperfect" Sekhmet statues were sold for £380, and a flawless one went for £300.

The premises at 190–195, built in 1881–1883, housing the Royal Institute of Painters in Water Colours and known as the "Royal Institute Galleries", are grade II listed. Number 195 is now home to BAFTA, Lyons' first teashop opened in Piccadilly in 1894, and from 1909 they developed into a chain, ultimately numbering around 200 locations, with the firm becoming a staple of the High Street in the UK.

=== 20th–21st centuries ===
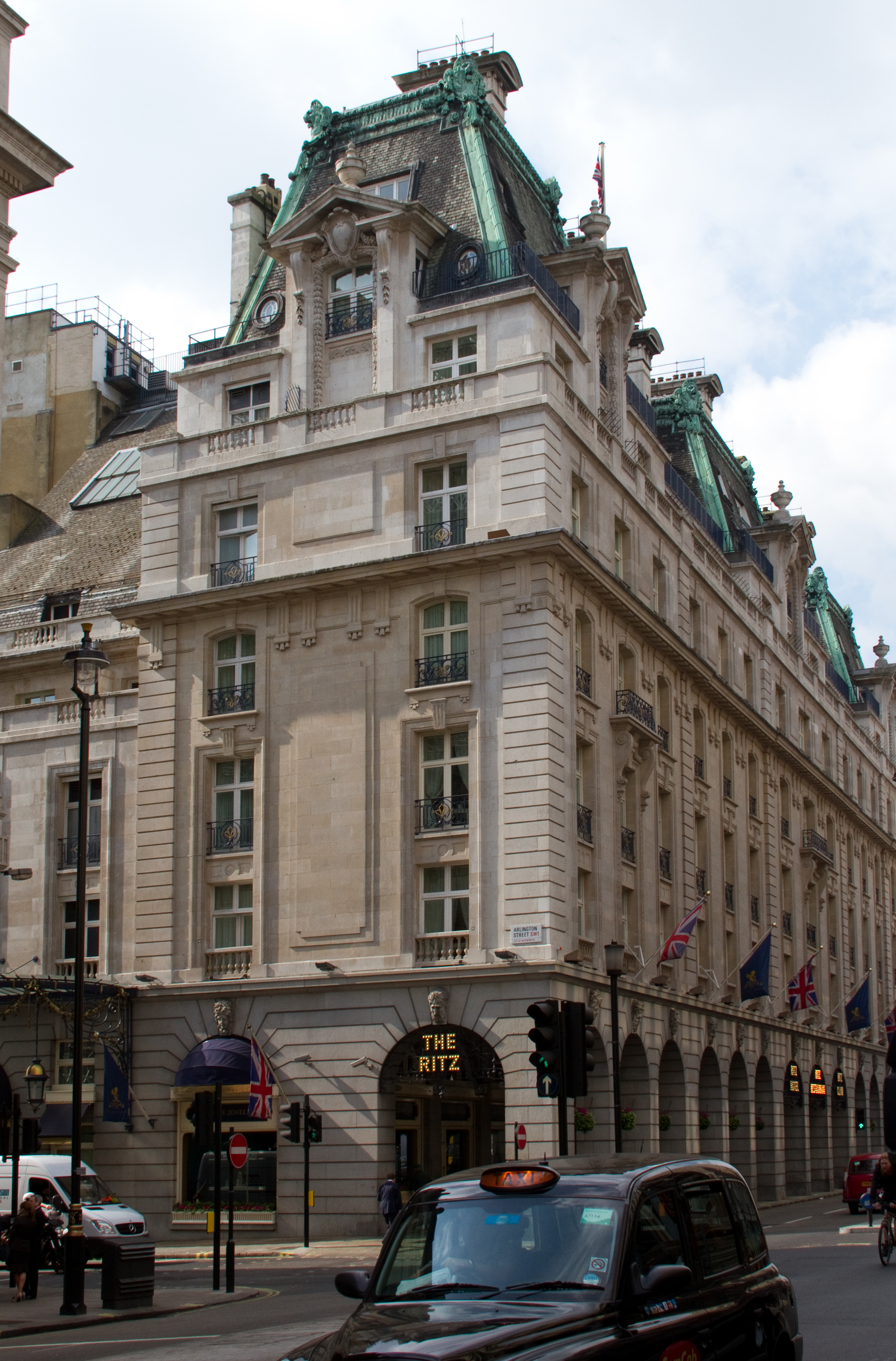
The Ritz hotel opened in Piccadilly in 1906

By the 1920s, most old buildings on the street had been demolished or were in institutional use; traffic noise had driven away residents, but a few residential properties remained. Albert, Duke of York was living at 145 Piccadilly at the time of his accession as King George VI in 1936; it was badly damaged by a bomb during the London Blitz.

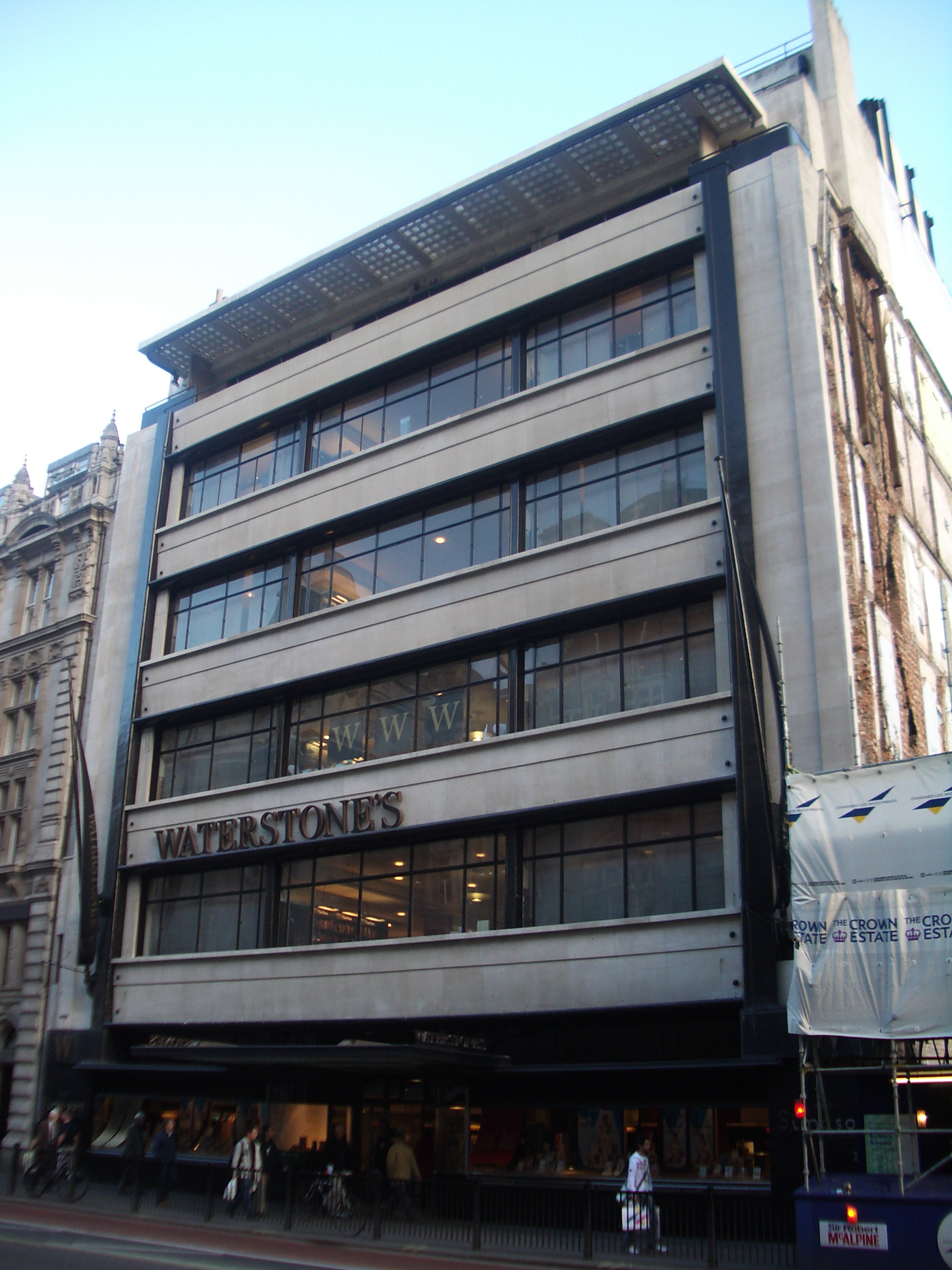
Simpsons of Piccadilly, now the Waterstones flagship store

The clothing store Simpson's was established at 203–206 Piccadilly by Alec Simpson in 1936, providing factory-made men's clothing. The premises were designed by the architect Joseph Amberton in a style that mixed art deco and Bauhaus school design and an influence from Louis Sullivan. On opening, it claimed to be the largest menswear store in London. It closed in January 1999; its premises are currently the flagship shop of the booksellers Waterstones.

During the 20th century, Piccadilly became known as a place to acquire heroin. Jazz trumpeter Dizzy Reece recalled people queuing outside Piccadilly's branch of Boots for heroin pills in the late 1940s. By the 1960s, the street and surrounding area were notorious as the centre of London's illegal drug trade, where heroin and cocaine could be purchased on the black market from unscrupulous chemists. By 1982, up to 20 people could be seen queueing at a chemist dealing in illegal drugs in nearby Shaftesbury Avenue. No. 144 was occupied by squatters in 1968, taking advantage of a law that allowed disused buildings to be used for emergency shelter for the homeless. The radical squatting movement that resulted foundered soon afterward, owing to the rise of drug dealers and Hells Angels occupying the site. An eviction took place on 21 September 1969; the events resulted in the licensing of squatting organisations that could take over empty premises to use as homeless shelters. In 1983, A. Burr of the British Journal of Addiction published an article on "The Piccadilly Drug Scene", in which the author discussed the regular presence of known dealers and easy accessibility of drugs.

Today, Piccadilly is regarded as one of London's principal shopping streets, hosting several famous shops. The Ritz Hotel, Park Lane Hotel, Athenaeum Hotel and Intercontinental Hotel are located on the street, along with other luxury hotels and offices. During the 20th century, it had been an established area for gentlemen's clubs; this usage has sharply declined, and only the Cavalry and Guards Club and the Royal Air Force Club remain.

== Transport ==
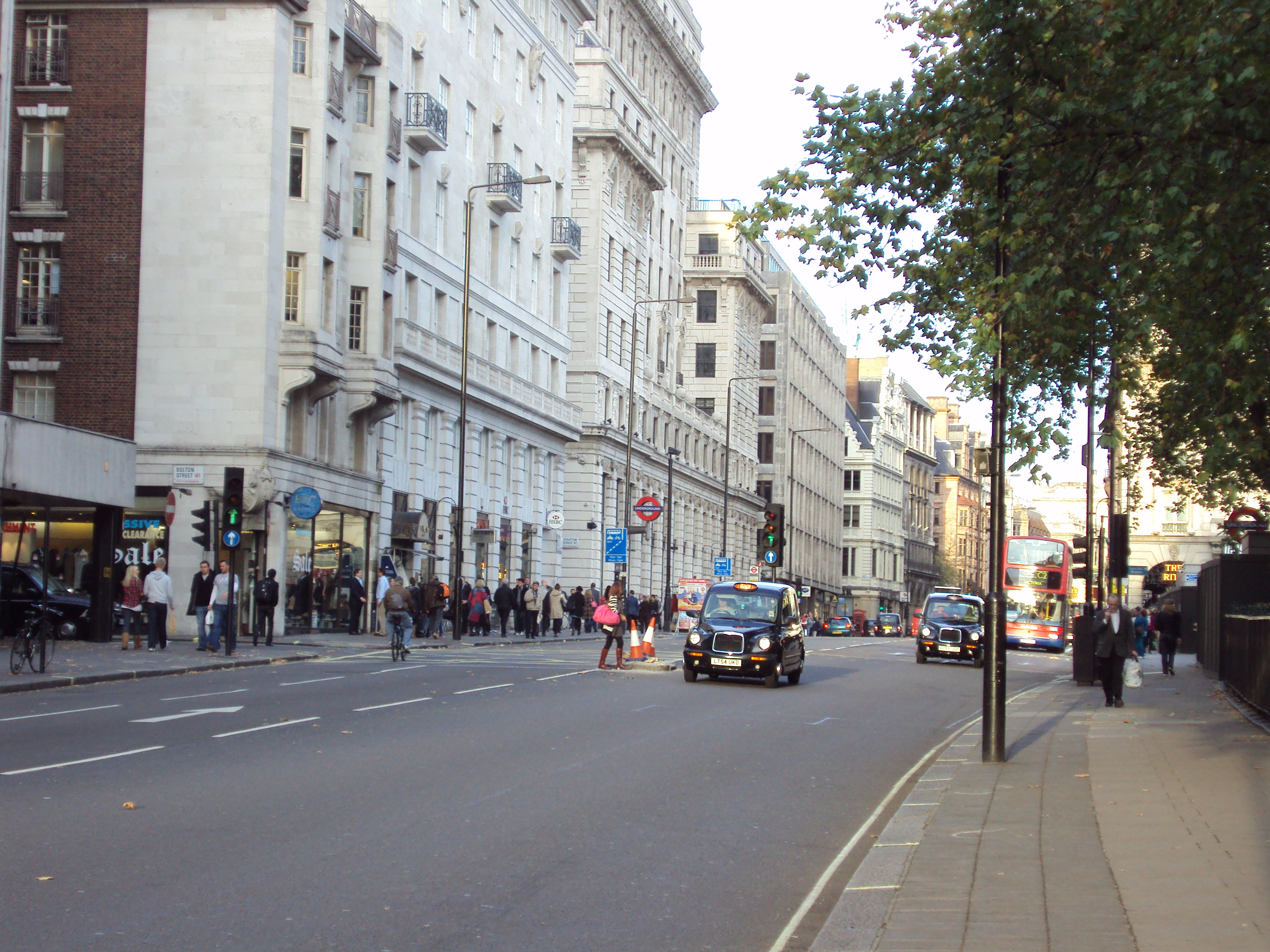
Piccadilly, looking towards Piccadilly Circus, near Green Park tube station in 2009

Piccadilly is a major thoroughfare in the West End of London and has several major road junctions. To the east, Piccadilly Circus opened in 1819 connecting it to Regent Street. It has become one of the most recognised landmarks in London, particularly after a statue of Eros was constructed on the junction in 1893, and the erection of large electric billboards in 1923. At the western end of Piccadilly is Hyde Park Corner, and the street has a major road junction with St James's Street and other significant junctions at Albemarle Street, Bond Street and Dover Street.

The road is part of the A4 connecting central London to Hammersmith, Earl's Court, Heathrow Airport and the M4 motorway. Congestion along the road has been reported since the mid-19th century, leading to its progressive widening and removing the northern portions of Green Park. Traffic signals were installed in the 1930s. In the late 1950s, the Ministry of Transport remodelled Hyde Park Corner at the western end to form a major traffic gyratory system, including enlargement of Park Lane. It opened on 17 October 1962 at a cost of £5 million.

London Buses routes 9, 10, 14, 19, N9, N19, N38 and N97 all run along Piccadilly. On 14 May 1973, a westbound bus lane came into operation between Piccadilly Circus and St James's Street. In November 1976 an eastbound bus lane was introduced between Old Park Lane and Berkeley Street. Part of the London Underground's Piccadilly line travels under the road. Hyde Park Corner, Green Park and Piccadilly Circus stations (which are all on the Piccadilly line), have entrances in or near Piccadilly. Down Street also served the western end of the street from 1907 until it closed in 1932 because of low usage.

== Cultural references ==
Piccadilly. is one of Letitia Elizabeth Landon's Scenes in London in Fisher's Drawing Room Scrap Book, 1836. It is evocative of many aspects of life in the city, both by day and by night.

The music hall song "It's a Long Way to Tipperary" mentions Piccadilly and Leicester Square in its lyrics. It was written in 1912 about an Irishman living in London, but became popular after being adopted by the mostly Irish Connaught Rangers during World War I. The street is mentioned in Gilbert and Sullivan's 1881 operetta Patience, in the lyrics of the song "If You're Anxious For To Shine". One of the major hit songs of the Edwardian musical play The Arcadians (1909) which enjoyed long runs in the West End of London and on New York's Broadway is "All down Piccadilly" (Simplicitas and Chorus, Act III, revised version), with music by Lionel Monckton who also co-wrote the words with Arthur Wimperis.

Piccadilly is mentioned in several works of fiction. E. W. Hornung's "gentleman thief" Raffles lives at the Albany, as does Jack Worthing from Oscar Wilde's The Importance of Being Earnest. According to author Mary C King, Wilde chose the street because of its resemblance to the Spanish word peccadillo, meaning "slashed" or "pierced". In Evelyn Waugh's novel Brideshead Revisited, the mansion Marchmain House, supposedly located in a cul-de-sac off St James's near Piccadilly, is demolished and replaced with flats. In the 1981 Granada Television dramatisation, Bridgewater House in Cleveland Row was used as the exterior of Marchmain House. In Bram Stoker's novel Dracula, Jonathan Harker is astonished to see the Count in Piccadilly, which sets off a chain of events that leads to the formation of the group of vampire hunters. Later, Dracula is confronted by the vampire hunters in his house in Piccadilly, before making his escape. In Arthur Machen's 1894 novella The Great God Pan, Helen Vaughan, the satanic villainess and offspring of Pan, lives off Piccadilly in the pseudonymous Ashley Street. Margery Allingham's fictional detective Albert Campion has a flat at 17A Bottle Street, Piccadilly, over a police station, although Bottle Street is equally fictitious. Several P.G. Wodehouse novels use the setting of Piccadilly as the playground of the rich, idle bachelor in the inter-war period of the 20th century. Notable instances are present in the characters of Bertie Wooster and his Drones Club companions in the Jeeves stories, and the character of James Crocker in the story "Piccadilly Jim". Dorothy Sayers' fictional detective Lord Peter Wimsey is described as living at 110A Piccadilly in the inter-war period.

In the 1963 movie The Great Escape the character Ashley-Pitt portrayed by David McCallum tells Squadron Leader Roger Bartlett "See you in Piccadilly, Scott's Bar" as he was making his escape from the tunnel.

The street is a square on the British Monopoly board, forming a set with Leicester Square and Coventry Street. When a European Union version of the game was produced in 1992, Piccadilly was one of three London streets selected, along with Oxford Street and Park Lane.

In 1996, Latvian singer Laima Vaikule released an album titled Ya vyshla na Pikadilli ("I Went Out on Piccadilly").

In 2019, Call of Duty: Modern Warfare featured a game level designed around the street.

== See also ==
- Bentley & Skinner jewellers
- Bomber Command Memorial
- British Academy of Film and Television Arts (BAFTA)
- Burlington Arcade
- Criterion Theatre
- Egyptian Hall
- Embassy of Japan
- Fortnum & Mason
- Hatchards
- Le Méridien Piccadilly Hotel
- Gloucester House, accommodating Hard Rock Cafe (their first restaurant)
- High Commission of Malta, London
- Norwich Union Building
- Princes Arcade
- Piccadilly Arcade
- Piccadilly (movie)
- The Ritz Hotel, London
