= Ernest Runtz =

English architect

Ernest Augustus Runtz
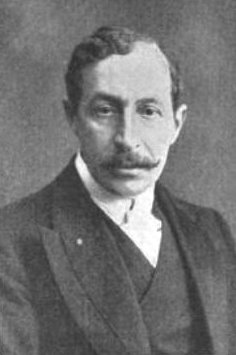
- Runtz in 1903
- Born: 1859; London, England
- Died: 1913 (aged 53–54); London, England
- Occupation: Architect
- Buildings: Gaiety Theatre

Ernest Augustus Runtz FRIBA (22 February 1859 – 15 October 1913) was an English architect who is known for his work in theatres, particularly in London.

== Training ==
Ernest Runtz was articled to Samuel Walker from 1875 to 1880, becoming his partner in 1883. He then studied architecture at University College London, attending lectures by Thomas Roger Smith. Working under Frederick Farrow, he qualified as an architect and started his own practice in 1897.

== Works ==
Runtz would work on a number of theatre buildings for which he was most known. He submitted designs for the buildings to be built on the newly developed Aldwych, in the end serving as architect for the Gaiety Theatre.

His work on 54-55 Cornhill saw the addition of the Cornhill Devils, demonic grotesques allegedly put in place as an act of revenge against the priest of the neighbouring St Peter's Cornhill with whom he had a conflict and falling out.

His works include:

- 54–55 Cornhill (1893)
- Adelphi Theatre (1901), replaced by a new design in 1930
- Marina Theatre (1901)
- Theatre Royal, Birmingham (1902 rebuild), demolished 1956
- Gaiety Theatre (1903)
- 162–165 Piccadilly (1909)
- 36–38 Queen Anne's Gate (1910)
