= Death of Yves Sakila =

2026 police controversy in Ireland

- Headshot of Yves Sakila
- Date: 15 May 2026
- Location: Henry Street, Dublin, Ireland

On 15 May 2026, Yves Sakila, a Congolese-born 35-year-old man living in Ireland, died after being restrained by security guards outside Arnott's department store on Henry Street, Dublin. He became unresponsive while restrained and was later pronounced dead. A video of the incident, circulating on social media, shows Sakila being held down on the ground for almost five minutes, during which time one person appears to kneel on his head or neck. Sakila had allegedly shoplifted from the department store.

== Biography ==
Born in the Democratic Republic of the Congo, Sakila had been living in Ireland since 2004 and had become a naturalised Irish citizen. He had attended secondary school in Blanchardstown. His biological father, Noberto Longo Sakila, died in a car crash when Sakila was a child. In 2004, at the age of 13, Sakila's uncle and aunt brought him to Ireland through a family reunification programme. The aunt and uncle's relationship subsequently broke down, and Sakila entered foster care at the age of 16. According to his aunt, during his time in care he was "in a dangerous place mentally".

Sakila had been homeless for several years prior to his death. He had lived at The Granby Centre, a homeless hub jointly run by the church and the Salvation Army, since 2024. He worshiped at the Zion Church in Clondalkin. He had previously worked in IT. He experienced periods of addiction. Chris Kibidi, a friend of Sakila, described him as "a nice guy" and said "whatever he did ...we need justice for him." Sakila had previously been convicted of shoplifting in January 2026, alongside prior offences of theft and robbery in 2018.

On 15 May 2026, Sakila was pronounced dead at the Mater Misericordiae University Hospital. Lassane Quedraogo, the chairperson of the Africa Solidarity Centre Ireland, knew Sakila through his work and described him as "Gentle, smart, failed by the system". Sakila was 35 at the time of his death.

== Incident ==
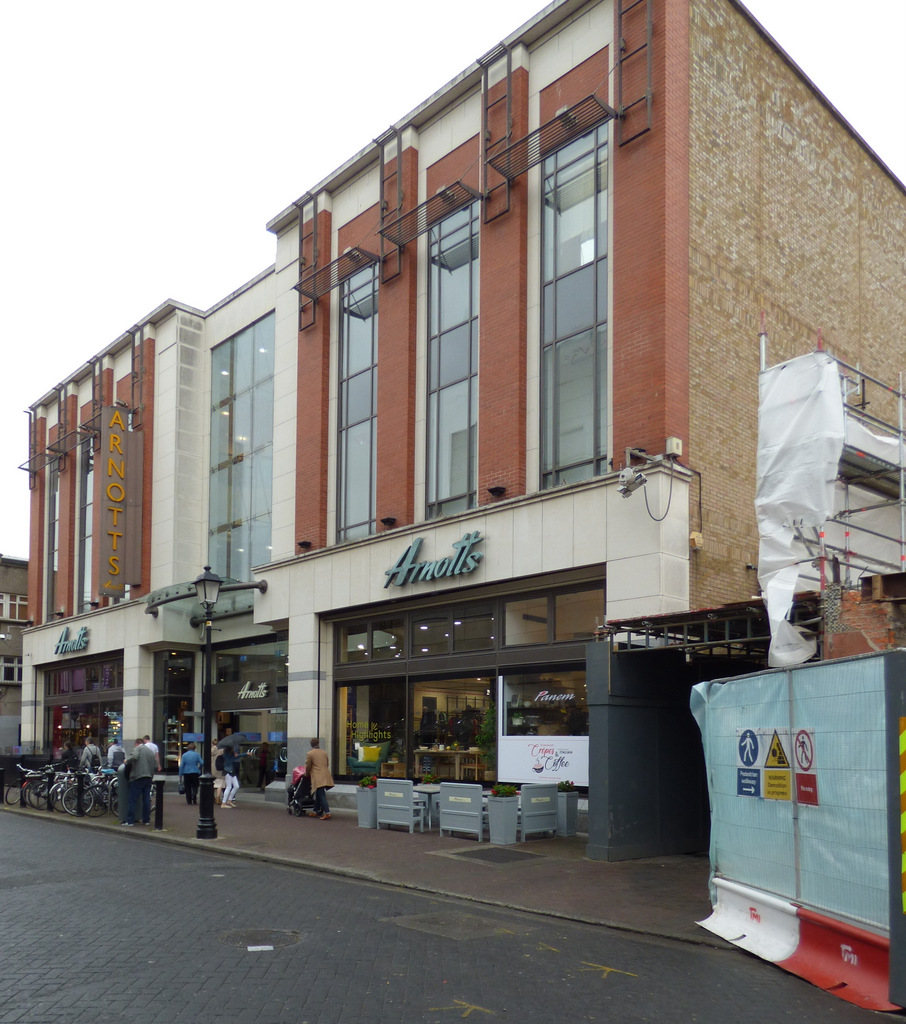
Arnotts department store (2019), the site of the incident

On 15 May 2026 around 5pm, Sakila allegedly shoplifted perfume from Arnotts department store on Henry Street, Dublin. He was restrained by private security personnel, employed by Synergy Security Solutions, from the department store. He was then held on the ground by the group of private security workers. The incident was captured on video and shared through social media and messaging apps. According to The Irish Times the video "shows Sakila moaning in distress as his face is pushed into the pavement." By the end of the video, he had stopped moving. Garda Síochána performed CPR on Sakila and then transported him to Mater Misericordiae University Hospital, where he was pronounced dead.

=== Initial investigations ===
In the period immediately following the incident, according to The Irish Times, investigations into Sakila's death were "focused on whether the manner he was held at the scene, and the force used, were a factor in his death."

A coroner's or pathologist's report was carried out on 16 May. Authorities ordered a report from a toxicologist to inform investigations. According to John Gerard Cullen, a representative of the Sakila family, the family were not made aware of the cause of death within the typical 24 hour period following the report. In late May, the family was given permission for a UK-based forensic pathologist, Dr David Rouse, to conduct an independent examination. Rouse said that Sakila's heart and brain should have been sent for specialist examination but that this did not occur, and EU guidelines had not been followed.

== Inquest ==
An inquest into Sakila's death is ongoing at Dublin District Coroner’s Court, it opened in October 2026. The results of a postmortem by the state pathologist said that Sakila had died as a result of “a cardio-respiratory arrest following a period of prone restraint, mixed drug intoxication, and a raised body mass index". The inquest has been adjourned under Section 25 (1) of the Coroners Act while other investigations continue, it will next be mentioned in April 2027.

== Responses ==
=== Political ===
Following Sakila's death, Micheál Martin, the Taoiseach, called for an investigation while speaking at the Dáil Éireann on 19 May. Martin said: "The full circumstances of what happened need to be examined and investigated fully and thoroughly. The situation is deeply concerning". While speaking in the Dáil, Ivana Bacik, leader of the Labour Party, described the incident as "very distressing and disturbing". The Ministry for Foreign Affairs of the Democratic Republic of the Congo issued a statement expressing "serious concern" and asking for an "independent, transparent and diligent investigation" to be conducted.

The Social Democrats' justice spokesperson Gary Gannon, Teachta Dála for the Dublin Central constituency, called the video of the incident "deeply disturbing and distressing" and said "there must be an immediate, comprehensive and transparent investigation into all of the circumstances which may have led to Mr Sakila's death." Contextualising the incident, Gannon said that "The migrant community in Ireland is suffering from rising hate and discrimination – which the government has done very little to combat".

Yemi Adenuga, a spokesperson for Black Coalition Ireland and a Fine Gael County Councillor, framed the issue in the context of tensions surrounding race relations and immigration in Ireland, and highlighted a recent increase in anti-immigrant sentiment. Fine Gael councillor Ejiro O’Hare Stratton, of Louth County Council stated: "The tragic death has deeply saddened many of us. My thoughts are with his family and all those grieving at this painful time". O'Hare Stratton further commented: "At a moment when public comments about migrants and Africans have caused fear, hurt and concern, we must reflect on the power of words. Language matters, leadership matters, humanity matters".

At the end of May, Thérèse Kayikwamba Wagner, the Foreign Minister of the Democratic Republic of the Congo, visited Ireland to meet Sakila's family. During the visit, Kayikwamba Wagner met with Minister for Justice, Home Affairs, and Migration Jim O'Callaghan, Minister for Foreign Affairs and Trade Helen McEntee, and President Catherine Connolly. Kayikwamba Wagner visited a memorial to Sakila with his family.

=== Civil society ===
Ebun Joseph, Ireland's Special Rapporteur on Racism and Racial Equality, called for an independent investigation into Sakila's death. Joseph wrote to the Minister for Justice, the Garda Commissioner, and the Executive Director of Fiosrú with her concerns. Joseph stated that the incident had "caused profound distress, fear, and outrage across many communities" and raised issues concerning racial profiling, the use of excessive force, and the over-policing of public space. The Irish Network Against Racism released a statement saying: "the death of a Black man in such circumstances is extremely worrying".

Arnotts, the department store whose security staff had restrained Sakila, issued a statement saying: "No loss of life should ever be the outcome of a retail security incident. We recognise the deep hurt and concern this tragedy has caused within Dublin’s Congolese community and among the wider public, and we take those concerns with the utmost seriousness". A vigil was held on 19 May outside of the department store, it was attended by more than 100 people. At the vigil, members of the Congolese Community in Ireland prayed, sang, and laid flowers. During a protest on 21 May, Suzie Tansia of the Congolese Community Ireland said: "Yves Sakila was a man who did not deserve to die" elaborating "He was a human being, like you and I. He was somebody’s son, and that could have been any one of us".

On 19 May, the Irish Council for Civil Liberties issued a statement that it was "shocked by and deeply concerned about the death of Mr Yves Sakila". The council said: "the footage is deeply distressing and clearly shows a disproportionate and excessive use of force by people who seem to be security personnel". The council stated that "this incident raises serious questions about the role, powers, oversight and accountability of private security actors in Ireland."

On 19 May, the Irish Human Rights and Equality Commission issued a statement describing the death as "tragic" and noting "the profound shock and distress that this incident has caused, particularly within the Congolese community and wider Black and minority ethnic communities." The commission called for "a full, independent and prompt investigation".

Dublin City Interfaith Forum issued a statement expressing their "shock and deep sorrow at the tragic death of Yves Sakila". Archbishop Michael Jackson said: "Compassion requires us not only to mourn with those who mourn, but also to listen carefully to the fears and experiences being voiced by minority communities in Ireland today." The forum joined calls "for a full, transparent, and independent investigation".

Responses to the death included comparisons to the May 2020 murder of George Floyd, a 46-year-old Black man who was killed by a white police officer in Minneapolis, United States. Floyd had also died after being restrained. Yemi Adenuga stated, "When you look at that video, it literally is like a reenactment of what happened to George Floyd". Seán Gallen, writing in The Guardian, also compared the incident with the murder of George Floyd and said that: "Ireland maintains a pristine public image abroad: friendly, convivial, welcoming to the outside world. When I meet people on my travels, they are shocked to hear that racism is a reality for many Irish citizens." Also in The Guardian, Nesrine Malik wrote: "It remains a distressing, repetitive pattern: that societies are only forced to confront their systemic racism once a Black person dies in plain sight."

UK broadcaster Channel 4 made a post on X (formerly known as Twitter) stating that Sakila had died "at the hands of police in Dublin". Gardaí then contacted the broadcaster concerning the post. Channel 4 subsequently removed the post and posted again with a correction.

=== Family ===
John Gerard Cullen, a solicitor representing the Sakila family, said: "He was homeless, he had certain drug issues, and it seems that he suffered a loss of life about a bottle of perfume or something like that which does not ordinarily attract the capital penalty". Cullen added: "There seems to have been an extraordinarily disproportionate use of violence. And what we are looking for is just and a proper forensic inquiry into this case". Corneille Sakila, brother of Yves, said: "The family and the entire Congolese community demands justice".

== See also ==
- Death of George Nkencho
- Death of Abisay Cruz
- Death of Adama Traoré
- Murder of George Floyd
- Killing of Tony Timpa
