= John Rocha =

Chinese-Irish designer (born 1953)

John Rocha CBE
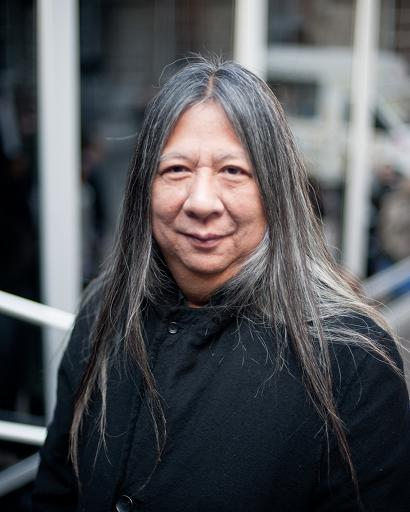
- John Rocha at the London Fashion Week in February 2010
- Born: 23 August 1953 (age 72); Hong Kong, British Hong Kong
- Occupation: Designer
- Spouse: Odette Gleeson
- Children: Simone Rocha
- Website: http://www.johnrocha.ie

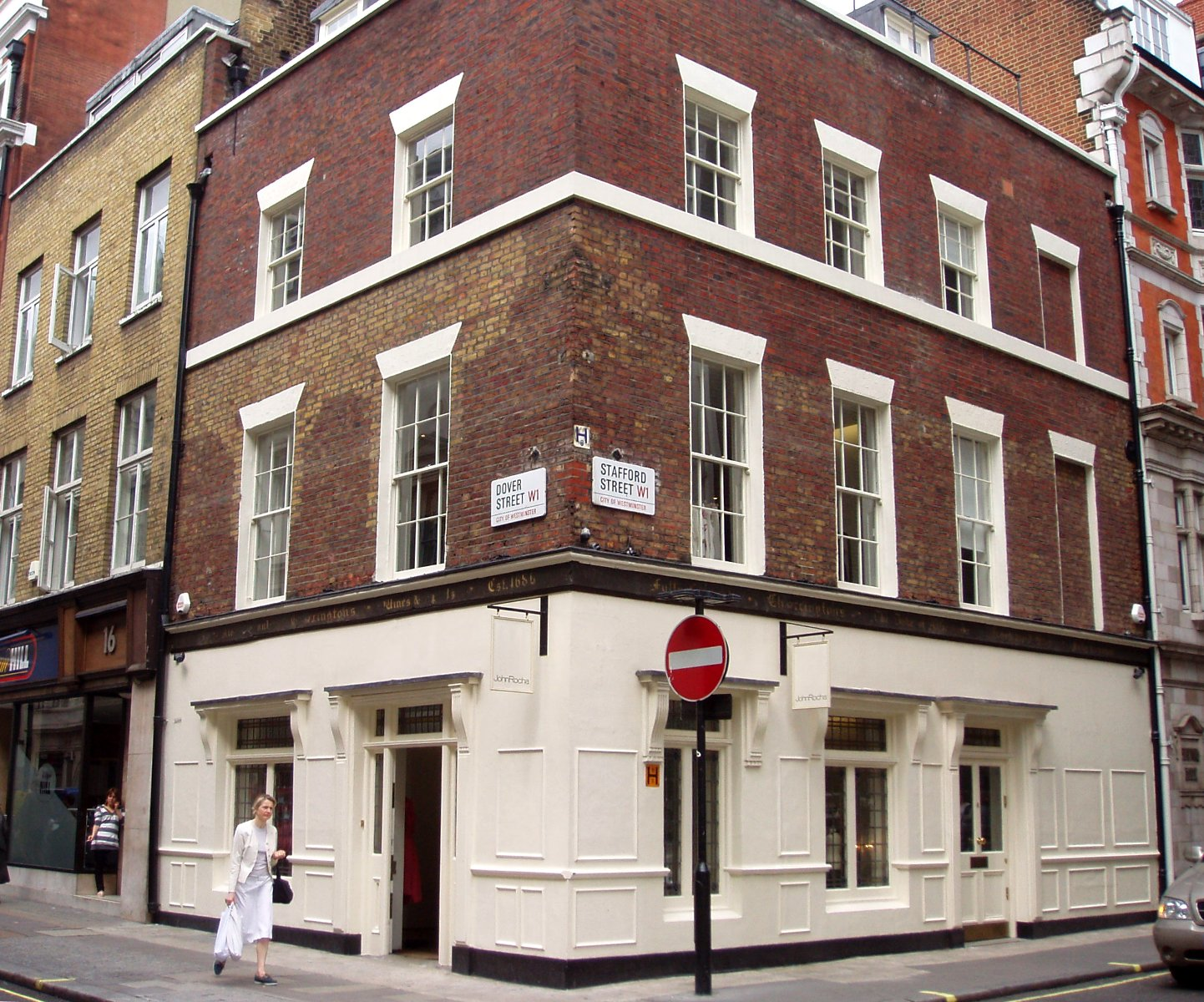
Shop of John Rocha housed in a former pub in Mayfair, London (2008)

John Rocha CBE (born 23 August 1953) is a Chinese-Irish designer born in Hong Kong. He is based in Ireland.

== Biography ==
He moved to Ireland after graduating from the Croydon School of Art, London. Known for his hand-crafting, beading and appliquée to garments, Rocha first established a name for himself with his Chinatown label in Dublin in the 1980s and later designing clothing for both men and women in the Irish high street stores A Wear and their luxury stores Brown Thomas. Rocha designed a range of cut crystal stemware and vases for Waterford Crystal in collaboration with glass designer Marcus Notley, until that firm's closure in 2008. The brand relaunched in 2010 and Rocha's crystal product ranges became available again.

By 1993, he was named Designer of the Year at the British Fashion Awards. Rocha ran his own "John Rocha", "John Rocha Jeans", "Rocha John Rocha" and "John Rocha Jewellery" labels alongside a diffusion clothing, homewear and accessories label for the department store Debenhams. Rocha has also designed the interiors of the Morrison Hotel in Dublin and the Orion Building in Birmingham. He was awarded the 'Special Award' at the Ernst and Young Irish Entrepreneur of the Year Awards 2008 which took place in the City West Hotel in Dublin on 23 October 2008.

Rocha continues to produce a 'pret-a-porter' womenswear and menswear range which he showcases twice annually at the British Fashion Council sponsored London Fashion Week (February & September). His John Rocha lifestyle boutique opened on Dover Street, London, in 2006. His design business, operating as Three Moon Design, is located at Dublin's Ely Place with a turnover of €200 million per year.

Rocha was appointed a Commander of the Order of the British Empire (CBE) in the 2002 New Year Honours, for services to the fashion industry.

In 2014 Rocha showcased another Spring/Summer collection at London Fashion Week and announced his retirement from the event, stating that At this point in my life I want to live by my calendar and not the Fashion Week calendar. Stopping allows me to do that.

In April 2015 he was awarded the Outstanding Achievement in Art & Design at The Asian Awards.

== Personal life ==
Rocha resides in Dublin with his wife. The Rocha family keep a second home in Saint-Jean-Cap-Ferrat in southern France. In his free time, Rocha enjoys fly fishing, reading, and travelling.

Rocha's daughter Simone Rocha is also a successful designer. His son, Max Rocha, is the owner and head chef of Cafe Cecilia, a popular east London restaurant.

== In popular culture ==
In 2010 Rocha was one of six contemporary, internationally renowned Irish fashion designers featured on a set of Irish postage stamps issued by An Post. The other designers featured were Paul Costelloe, Louise Kennedy, Lainey Keogh, Philip Treacy and Orla Kiely.

== See also ==
- List of people on the postage stamps of Ireland
