= Emma Manley =

Irish fashion designer and founder of Manley

- Born: c.1988 Dublin, Ireland
- Occupation: Fashion designer
- Known for: Founder and creative director of Manley

Emma Manley (born c. 1988) is an Irish fashion designer and entrepreneur. She is the founder and creative director of the womenswear label Manley, recognized for blending leather, hand embellishment, and contemporary tailoring. Her career has been profiled in major Irish publications and media platforms, and she is regarded as one of Ireland’s notable independent designers.

== Early life and education ==
Manley grew up in Dublin, where her mother worked as a bridalwear designer and introduced her to sewing in childhood. She attended Coolmine Community School and later studied at the Grafton Academy of Fashion Design after unsuccessful applications to NCAD and LSAD, an experience she has said helped shape her determination to work in fashion.

== Career ==
Early in her professional life, Manley interned with VPL in New York and later with Alexander McQueen in London, working in the embellishment department, an experience that influenced the decorative elements seen in her later work. She also held roles in retail and worked with Topshop in Dublin, including personal shopping and style advisory work.

She launched her label in 2011 with a modest six-piece collection, using pop-up shops and creative grassroots strategies to gain attention.

In 2016 she gained a high-profile commission designing the wedding gown for Irish actor Aoibhín Garrihy, a bespoke piece that drew widespread media coverage and catalyzed her bespoke bridal line.

She has also engaged in collaborative initiatives including co-founding the retail showcase BLOSS in 2018, participating in Brown Thomas’s CREATE program, and limited works such as festive designs for Insomnia Coffee Company and promotional pieces associated with The O2 in Dublin.

== Design ==
Emma’s style is known for the intersection of feminine and edgy: leather, metallics, and hand-appliqué embellishment are signature elements. In a 2016 Hot Press interview, she described her Autumn/Winter 2016 collection as inspired by 1950s pop art, with bold color palettes and strong geometric shapes paired with sheer paneling and metallic leathers.

== Awards and recognition ==
She won the Favourite Irish Designer award at the Peter Mark VIP Style Awards in 2018. National media, including RTÉ, have described her as one of Ireland’s most recognised designers.

== Personal life ==
Emma is married to Eoin Ó Súilleabháin, and the couple have three children, whom they are raising through the Irish language. In a 2019 podcast she discussed returning to work, maternity-friendly design and the challenges of balancing motherhood with entrepreneurship. In 2023, she appeared in the Irish Independent “My Money” column discussing household budgeting and her use of solar panels at home.

== See also ==
- Manley (fashion brand)
- Irish fashion
