= Manley (fashion brand) =

Irish fashion brand by Emma Manley

- Industry: Fashion
- Founded: 2011
- Founder: Emma Manley
- Headquarters: Ireland
- Products: Clothing, accessories
- Website: www.manley.ie

Manley is an Irish fashion label founded in 2011 by designer Emma Manley, who serves as the brand’s founder and creative director. The label is known for blending leather, embellishment, and contemporary tailoring. Over half of its garments and all jewellery are produced in Ireland.

== History ==
Emma Manley launched the brand in 2011 with a six-piece collection created on a budget of €80. Early collections were shown in pop-up shops, including one hosted in her family home. The brand subsequently expanded into jewellery and bags, and its products are stocked in Irish boutiques and shipped internationally.

== Design ==
Manley is noted for its use of leather, metallic fabrics, and hand-finished embellishment. Its design philosophy emphasises versatile, long-lasting pieces rather than trend-driven collections.

== Collaborations ==
Manley has participated in collaborations and retail showcases with Irish partners.

- BLOSS – a pop-up retail initiative co-founded by Emma Manley to showcase Irish design at Dundrum Town Centre (2018–2019).
- Brown Thomas CREATE – Manley was among the Irish designers featured in Brown Thomas’s CREATE showcase in 2013, which highlighted emerging and established labels.
- Insomnia Coffee Company – in 2016, Manley collaborated with Insomnia Coffee to design festive takeaway cups for the chain’s Christmas campaign.
- The O2 – Manley created customised pieces in association with The O2 Arena in Dublin, as part of a promotional campaign documented in photography by Andres Poveda.

== Notable commissions ==
In 2016, Manley designed the wedding dress for actor Aoibhín Garrihy. The bespoke gown, featuring thousands of hand-applied embellishments, was widely covered in Irish media and led to the launch of the Manley Bride line.

== Founder ==
Emma Manley studied at Coolmine Community School in Dublin before pursuing fashion at the Grafton Academy of Fashion Design, after being rejected by both the National College of Art and Design and Limerick School of Art and Design. She worked in New York with VPL and in London with Alexander McQueen before returning to Ireland and working with Topshop.

== Recognition and media ==
RTÉ described Manley as "one of Ireland’s most recognised designers". The brand and its founder have been profiled in Irish Times, Irish Examiner, Image, RSVP Live, and Hot Press.
