= Selfridges =

English department store chain

Selfridges Retail Limited

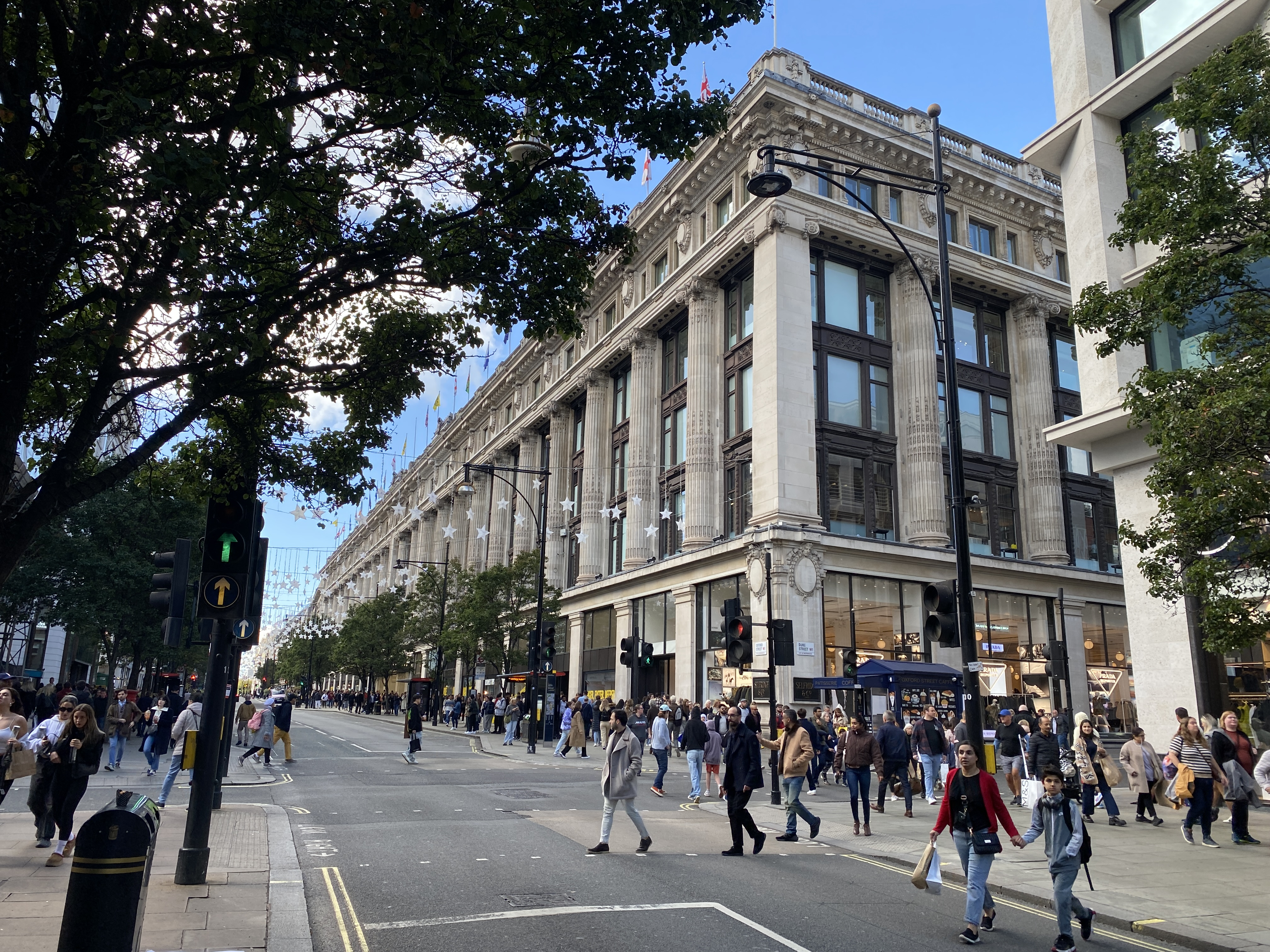
- Exterior of the Selfridges flagship store in London (2023)
- Trade name: Selfridges; Selfridges & Co.
- Type: Subsidiary
- Industry: Retail
- Genre: Department stores
- Founded: 1909; 117 years ago in London, England
- Founder: Harry Gordon Selfridge
- Headquarters: 400 Oxford Street, Marylebone, London, England
- Number of locations: 4 (2024)
- Area served: United Kingdom
- Parent: Selfridge Provincial Stores (1926–1940); John Lewis Partnership (1940–1951); Lewis's (1951–1965); Sears plc (1965–1998); Selfridges Group (2003–present)
- Website: selfridges.com

Selfridges Retail Limited (doing business as Selfridges and occasionally Selfridges & Co.) is a British department store chain. It was founded by American retail magnate Harry Gordon Selfridge in 1909. The historic Daniel Burnham-designed Selfridges flagship store at 400 Oxford Street in London opened on 15 March 1909 and is the second-largest shop in the UK (after Harrods). Other Selfridges stores opened in the Manchester area at the Trafford Centre (1998) and at Exchange Square (2002), and in Birmingham at the Bullring (2003).

During the 1940s, smaller provincial Selfridges stores were sold to the John Lewis Partnership, and in 1951, the original Oxford Street store was acquired by the Liverpool-based Lewis's chain of department stores. Lewis's and Selfridges were then taken over in 1965 by the Sears Group, owned by Charles Clore. Expanded under the Sears Group to include branches in Manchester and Birmingham, the chain was acquired in 2003 by Canada's Galen Weston for £598 million. In December 2021, the Weston family agreed to sell the majority of Selfridges Group for around £4 billion to a joint venture between Thai conglomerate Central Group and Austria's Signa Holding. The acquisition was completed on 23 August 2022. However, after Signa faced financial difficulties and declared bankruptcy, Saudi Arabia's Public Investment Fund (PIF) acquired Signa's shares in Selfridges, becoming a co-owner alongside the Central Group.

== History ==
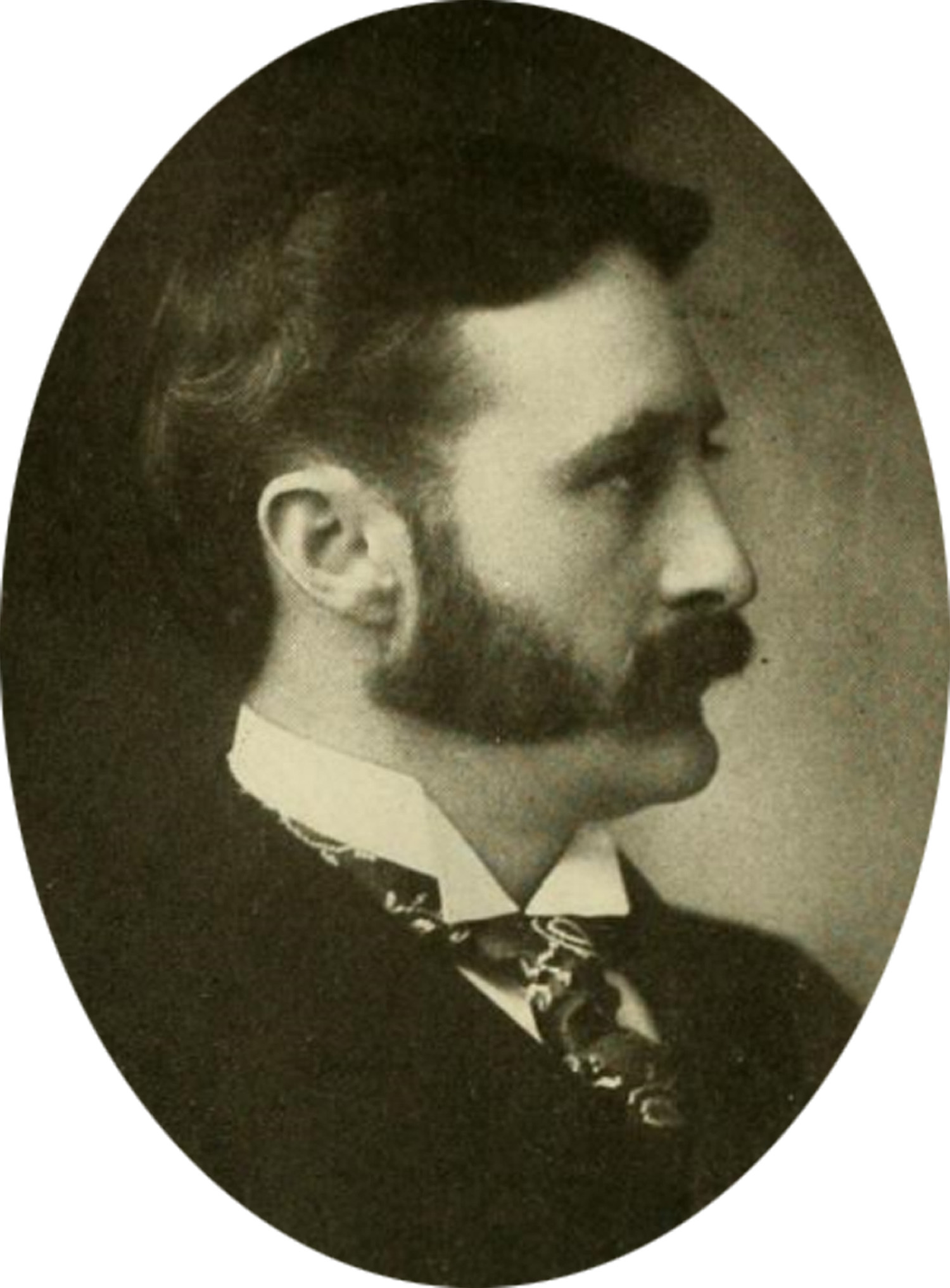
Harry Gordon Selfridge, c. 1880

The basis of Harry Gordon Selfridge's success was his relentlessly innovative marketing, which was elaborately expressed in his Oxford Street store. Originally from America himself, Selfridge attempted to dismantle the idea that consumerism was strictly an American phenomenon. He tried to make shopping a fun adventure and a form of leisure instead of a chore, transforming the department store into a social and cultural landmark that provided women with a public space in which they could be comfortable and legitimately indulge themselves. Emphasizing the importance of creating a welcoming environment, he placed merchandise on display so customers could examine it, and moved the highly profitable perfume counter front-and-centre on the ground floor.

Either Selfridge or Marshall Field is popularly held to have coined the phrase "the customer is always right".

In 1909, after the first cross-Channel flight, Louis Blériot's monoplane, the Blériot XI, was put on display at Selfridges, where it was seen by 150,000 people over a four day period. John Logie Baird made the first public demonstration of moving silhouette images by television from the first floor of Selfridges from 1 to 27 April 1925.

In the 1920s and 1930s, the roof of the store hosted terraced gardens, cafes, a mini golf course and an all-girl gun club. The roof, with its extensive views across London, was a common place for strolling after a shopping trip and was often used for fashion shows.

During the Second World War, the store's basement was used as an air-raid shelter and during raids employees were usually on the lookout for incendiary bombs and took watch in turns.

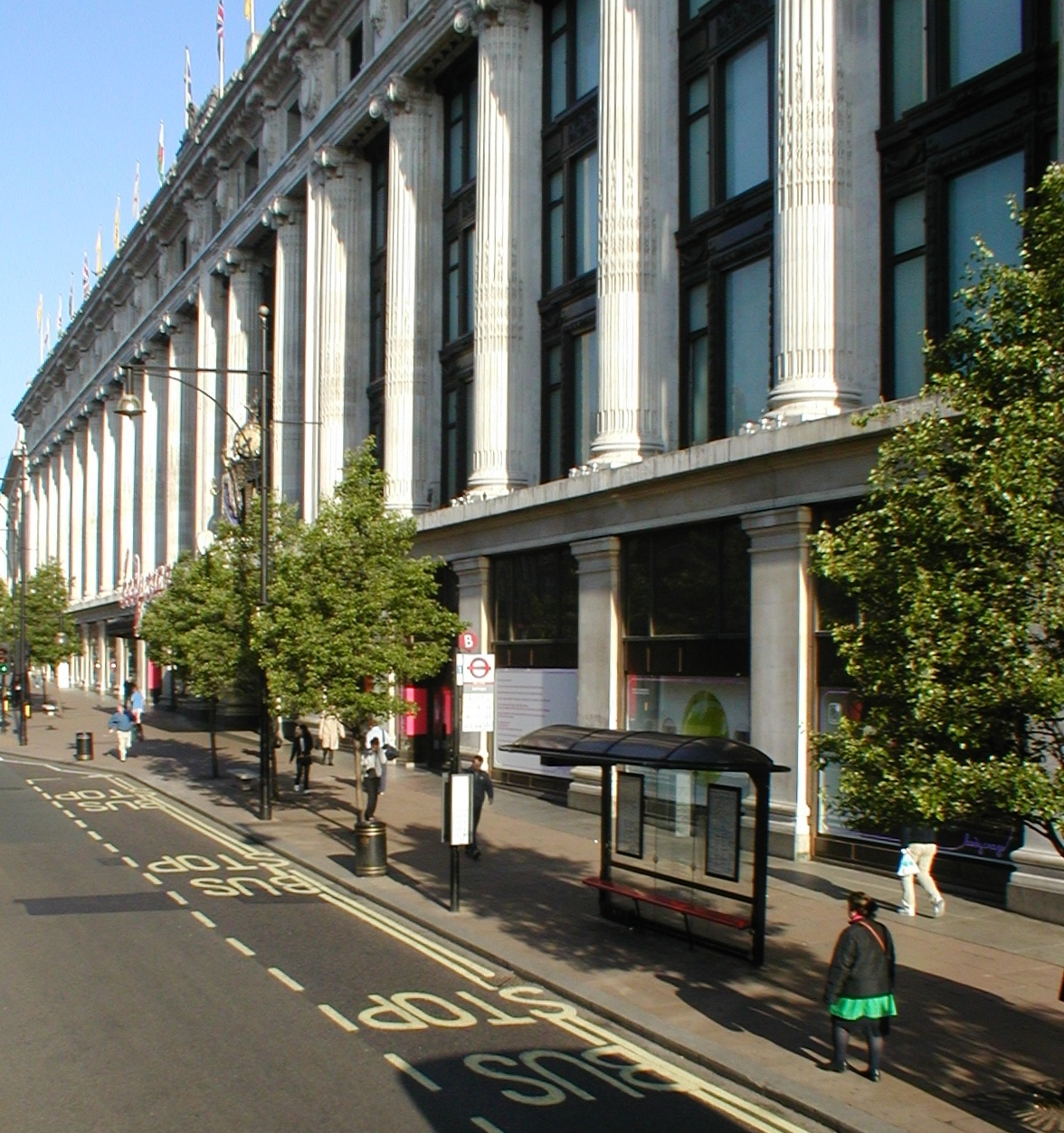
The Oxford Street store in London

A Milne-Shaw seismograph was set up on the Oxford Street store's third floor in 1932, attached to one of the building's main stanchions, where it remained unaffected by traffic or shoppers. It successfully recorded the Belgian earthquake of 11 June 1938, which was also felt in London. In 1947, it was given to the Science Museum.

The huge SIGSALY scrambling apparatus, by which transatlantic conferences between American and British officials (most notably Winston Churchill and Franklin D. Roosevelt) were secured against eavesdropping, was housed in the basement from 1943 on, with extension to the Cabinet War Rooms about a mile away.

In 1926, Selfridges set up the Selfridge Provincial Stores company, which had expanded over the years to include sixteen provincial stores, but these were sold to the John Lewis Partnership in 1940. The Liverpool-based Lewis's chain of department stores acquired the remaining Oxford Street Shop in 1951, expanding the brand by adding Moultons of Ilford, purchased from rival chain R H O Hills and renaming the store Selfridges. In 1965 the business was purchased by the Sears Group, owned by Charles Clore. Under the Sears group, branches in Ilford and Oxford opened, with the latter remaining Selfridges until 1986, when Sears rebranded it as a Lewis's store. In 1990, Sears Group split Selfridges from Lewis's and placed Lewis's in administration a year later. In March 1998, Selfridges introduced new branding in tandem with the opening of the Manchester Trafford Centre store and Selfridges' demerger from Sears.

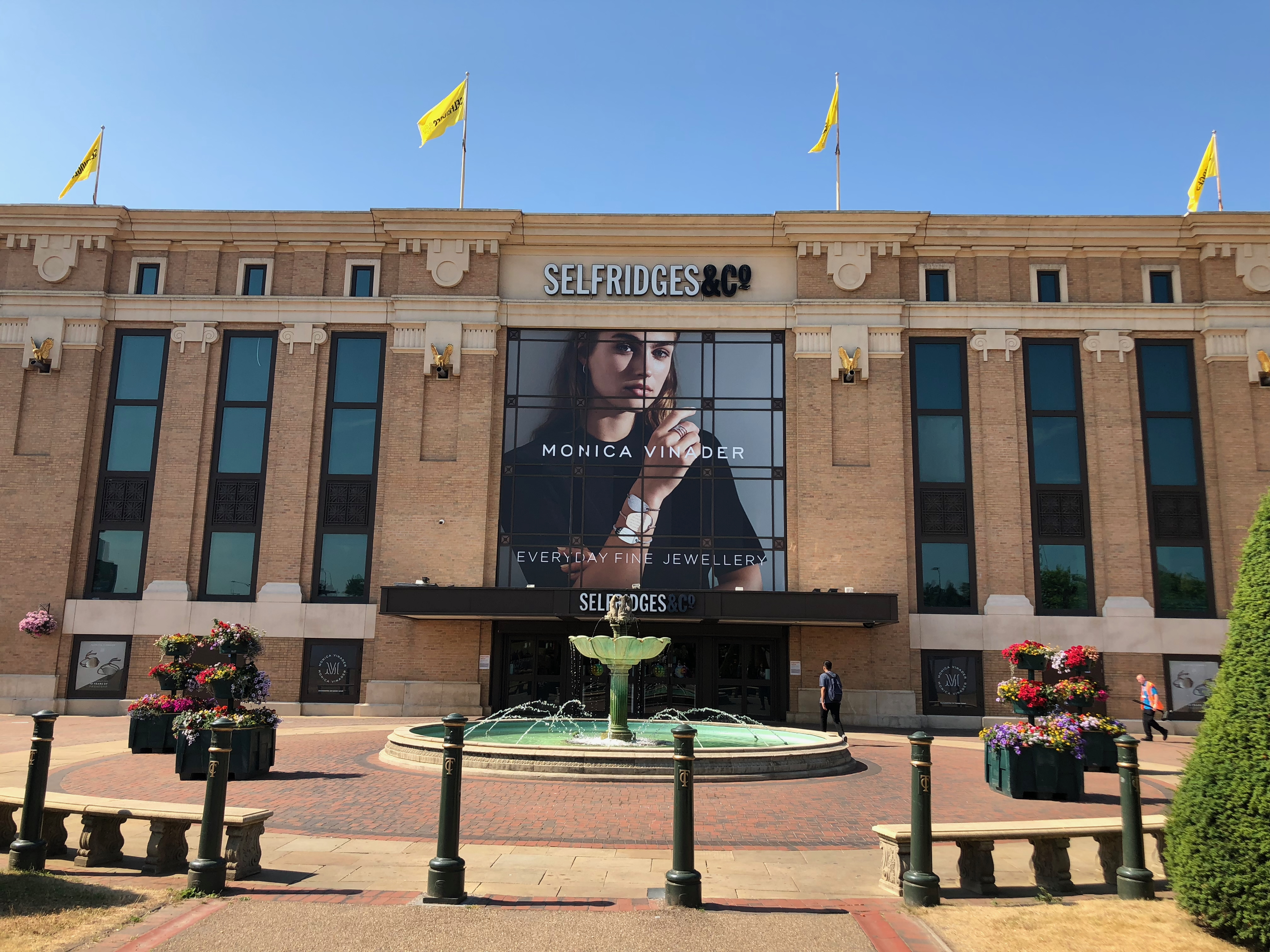
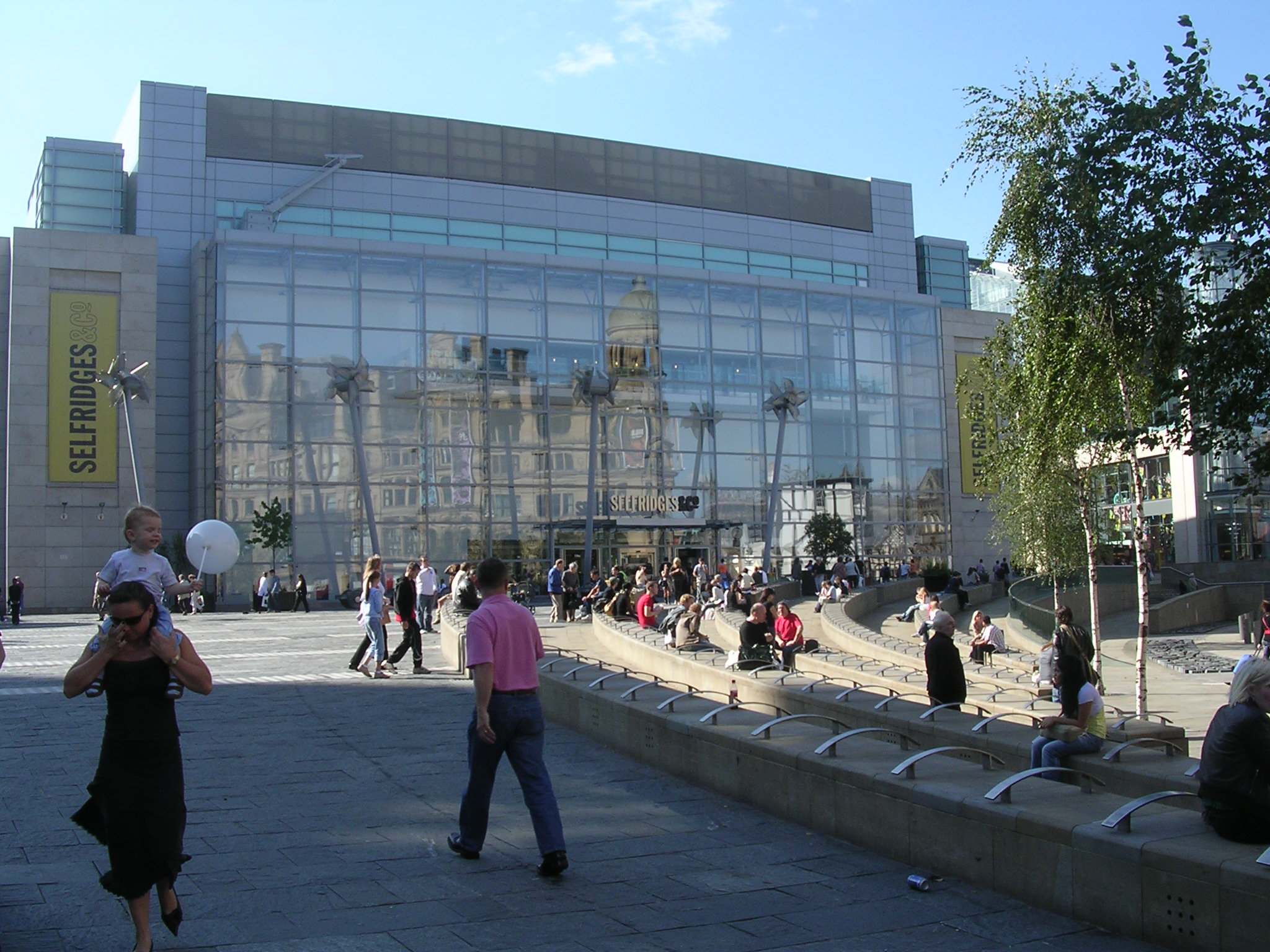
Selfridges at the Trafford Centre, which opened in 1998 (left) Selfridges at Exchange Square, Manchester (right)

In September 1998, Selfridges expanded and opened its first department store outside London. A 200,000-square-foot (18,600 m^{2}) anchor store at the newly opened Trafford Centre in Greater Manchester. Following its success, Selfridges announced they would open an additional store in Greater Manchester. A 126,000-square-foot (11,700 m^{2}) store in Exchange Square, Manchester city centre opened in 2002 as Manchester city centre started to return to normal following the 1996 Manchester bombing.

A 150,000-square-foot (14,000 m^{2}) store soon followed in 2003 at Birmingham's Bull Ring.

Plans for expansion and additional stores continued soon after. Desired locations included Leeds, Liverpool, Dublin and Glasgow. The company purchased a site in Glasgow in 2002 and announced a new 200,000 sq ft Scottish flagship store was due to open in 2007. The following year all expansion plans were put on hold as the company began negotiations to sell the business. The Glasgow site was eventually sold off in 2013 and no plans to open any future stores has been announced - as of 2023.

In 2003, the chain was acquired by Canada's Galen Weston for £598 million and some of his other investments, which included Brown Thomas and Arnotts in Ireland, Holt Renfrew in Canada and de Bijenkorf in the Netherlands, became part of Selfridges Group. Weston, a retailing expert who is the owner of Loblaw Companies in Canada, chose to invest in the renovation of the Oxford Street store—rather than to create new stores in British cities other than Manchester and Birmingham.

In October 2009, Selfridges revived its rooftop entertainment with the pop up "The Restaurant on the Roof" restaurant. In July 2011, Truvia created an emerald green boating lake (with a waterfall, a boat-up cocktail bar and a forest of Stevia plants). In 2012 the Big Rooftop Tea and Golf Party featured "the highest afternoon tea on Oxford Street" and a nine-hole golf course with "the seven wonders of London" realised in cake as obstacles.

In August 2020, during a difficult time for UK retail, Selfridges offered luxury pieces for hire to millennial and socially conscious clients. The store partnered with HURR, an online fashion rental platform, offering hire of 100 items from over 40 fashion brands for up to 20 days at a time.

The Weston family put the Selfridges business up for auction in July 2021, with an estimated value of £4 billion. The sale includes all stores including the flagship Oxford Street store and worldwide outlets. In early December 2021, the family was reported to be finalising the chain's sale to Central Group.

On 24 December 2021, it was announced that the majority of Selfridges Group had been sold to a joint venture between Thai conglomerate Central Group and the Austrian Signa Holding for around £4 billion.

In 2024, Thailand's Central Group partnered with Saudi Arabia's Public Investment Fund (PIF) to co-own the Selfridges Group. After Signa's bankruptcy, PIF acquired its shares, leaving Central Group with a 60% stake and PIF with 40%.

== Architecture ==
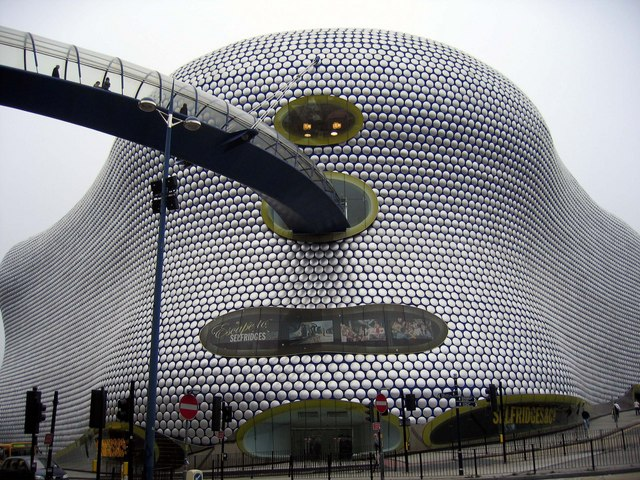
Selfridges Birmingham

Selfridge stores are known for architectural innovation and excellence, and are tourist destinations in their own right. The original London store was designed by Daniel Burnham, who also created the Marshall Field's main store in his home town of Chicago. Burnham was the leading American department store designer of the time and had works in Boston (Filenes's), New York (Gimbel's, Wanamaker's), and Philadelphia (Wanamaker's, his magnum opus).

The London store was built in phases. The first phase consisted of only the nine-and-a-half bays closest to the Duke Street corner, and is an example of one of the earliest uses of steel cage frame construction for this type of building in London. This circumstance, according to the report of a contemporary London correspondent from the Chicago Tribune, was largely responsible for making possible the eventual widespread use of Chicago’s steel frame cage construction system in the United Kingdom:

“Under the pressure of [Mr. Selfridge] and the interests allied with him, the councilors admitted the soundness of American building methods and framed a bill which will be pressed at once in parliament [sic] to permit these methods to be used here.”

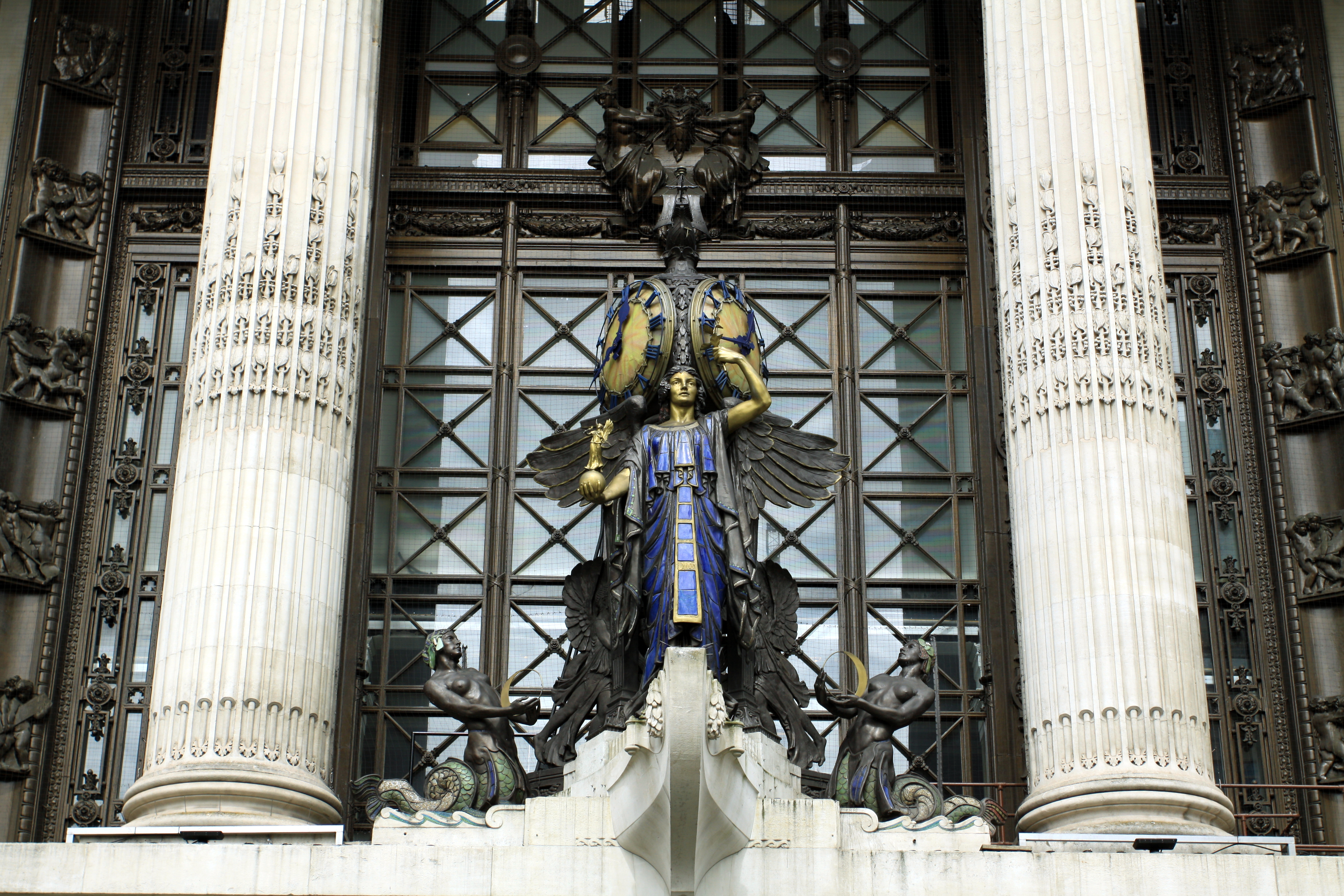
Detail of sculpture above the London store's entrance

Also involved in the design of the store were American architect Francis Swales, who worked on decorative details, and British architects R. Frank Atkinson and Thomas Smith Tait. The distinctive polychrome sculpture above the Oxford Street entrance is the work of British sculptor Gilbert Bayes.

The Daily Telegraph named Selfridges in London the world's best department store in 2010.

The Birmingham store, designed by architects Future Systems, is covered in 15,000 spun aluminium discs on a background of Yves Klein Blue. Since it opened in 2003, the Birmingham store has been named every year by industry magazine Retail Week as one of the 100 stores to visit in the world.

== Windows ==
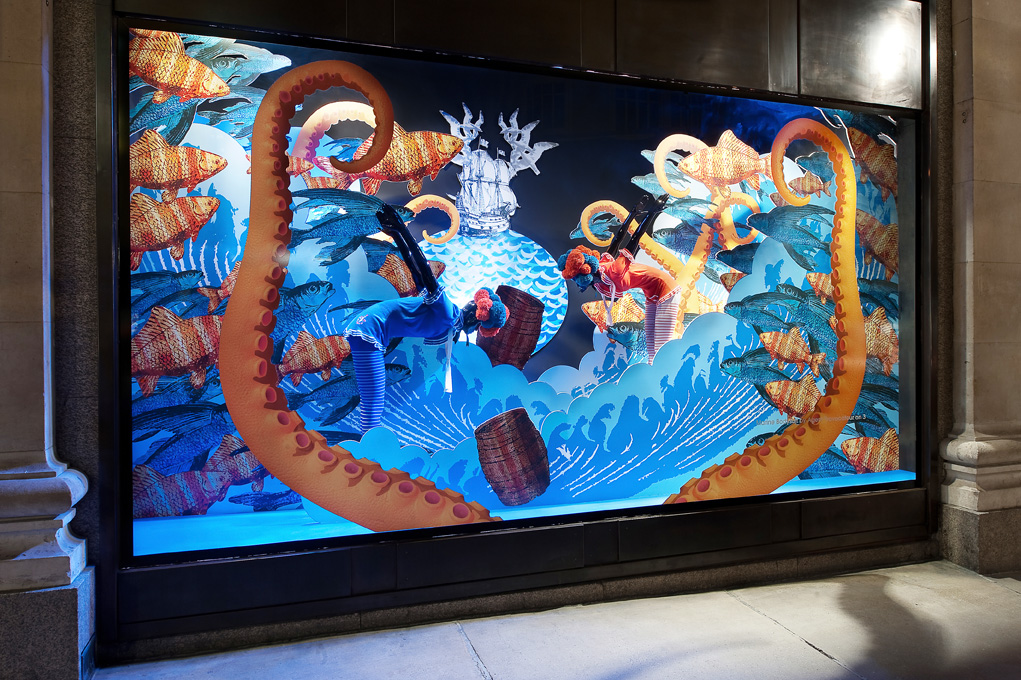
A Selfridges window display

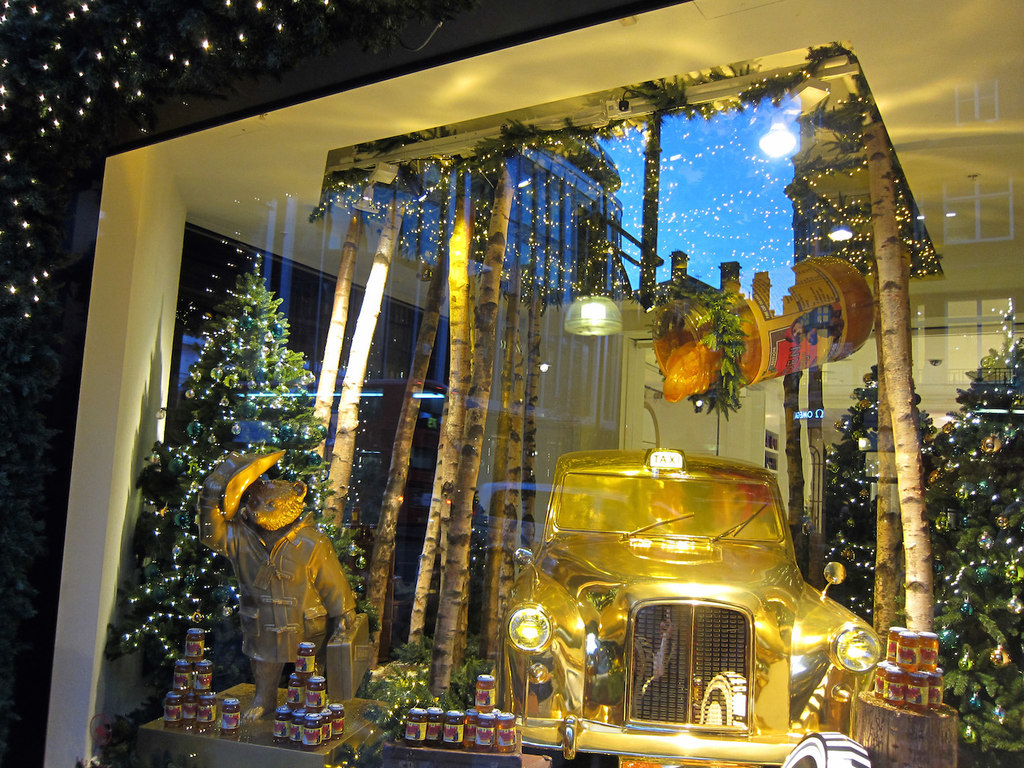
Selfridges' Paddington Bear themed Christmas window display in 2014

Selfridges' windows have become synonymous also with the brand, and to a certain degree have become as famous as the company and Oxford Street location itself. Selfridges has a history of bold art initiatives when it comes to the window designs. Selfridge himself likened the act of shopping to the act of attending the theatre and encouraged his customers to make this connection as well by covering his show windows with silk curtains before dramatically unveiling the displays on opening day. Later, when the building was undergoing restoration, the scaffolding was shrouded with a giant photograph of stars such as Sir Elton John by Sam Taylor-Wood. For Christmas 2014, the window displayed a Kate Moss-designed Paddington Bear statue—themed "Goldie Bear"—which was auctioned to raise funds for the National Society for the Prevention of Cruelty to Children (NSPCC).

Since 2002, the windows have been photographed by London photographer Andrew Meredith and published in magazines such as Vogue, Dwell, Icon, Frame, Creative Review, Hungarian Stylus Magazine, Design Week, Harper's Bazaar, The New York Times, WGSN as well as many worldwide media outlets, including the world wide press, journals, blogs and published books.

== Opening day and marketing ==
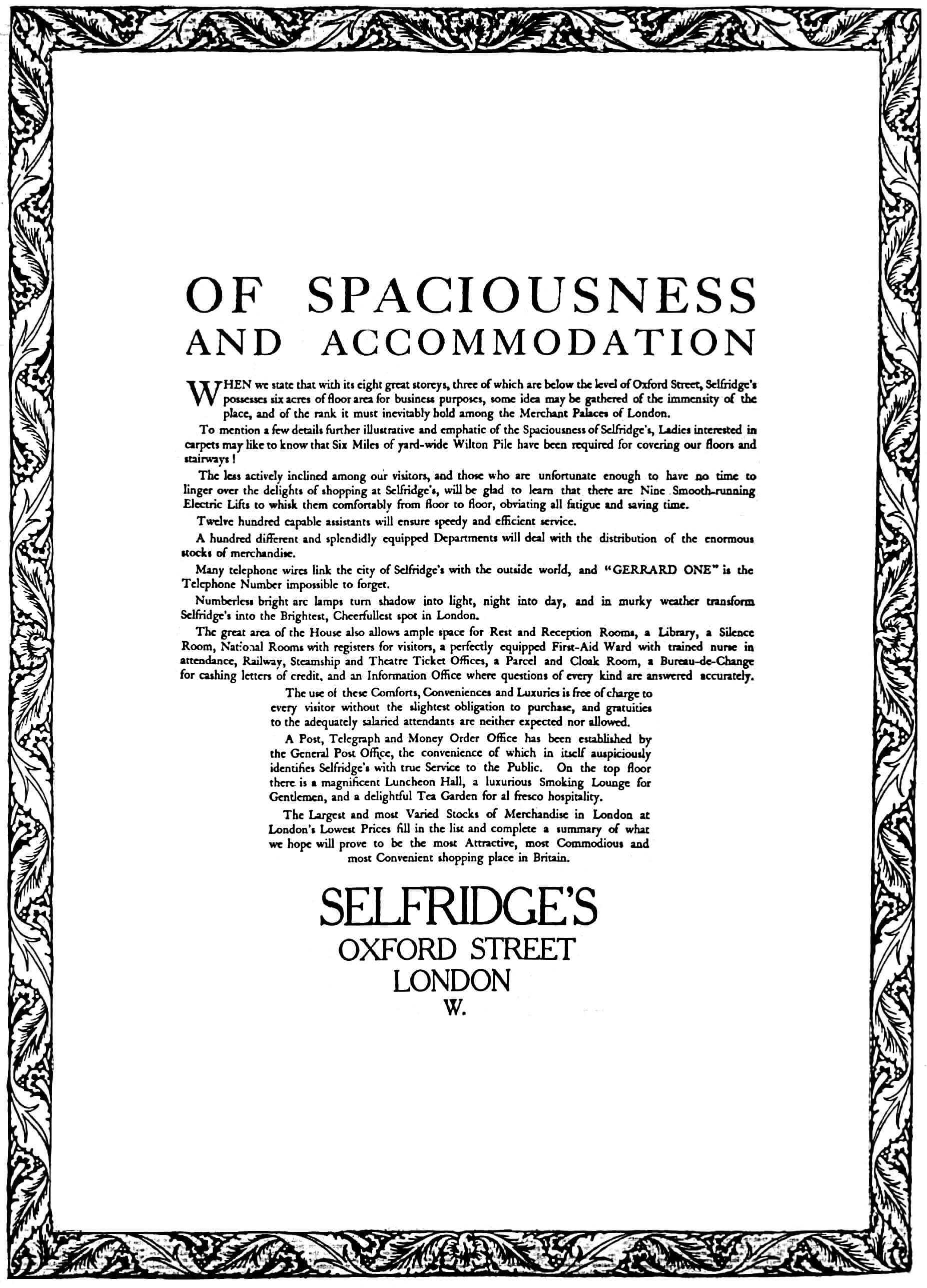
During opening week, a full-page ad in The Times touted the store's size, spaciousness, nine "electric lifts", 1200 sales assistants in 100 departments, "many telephone wires", "numberless bright arc lamps", and other amenities provided "free of charge to every visitor without the slightest obligation to purchase".

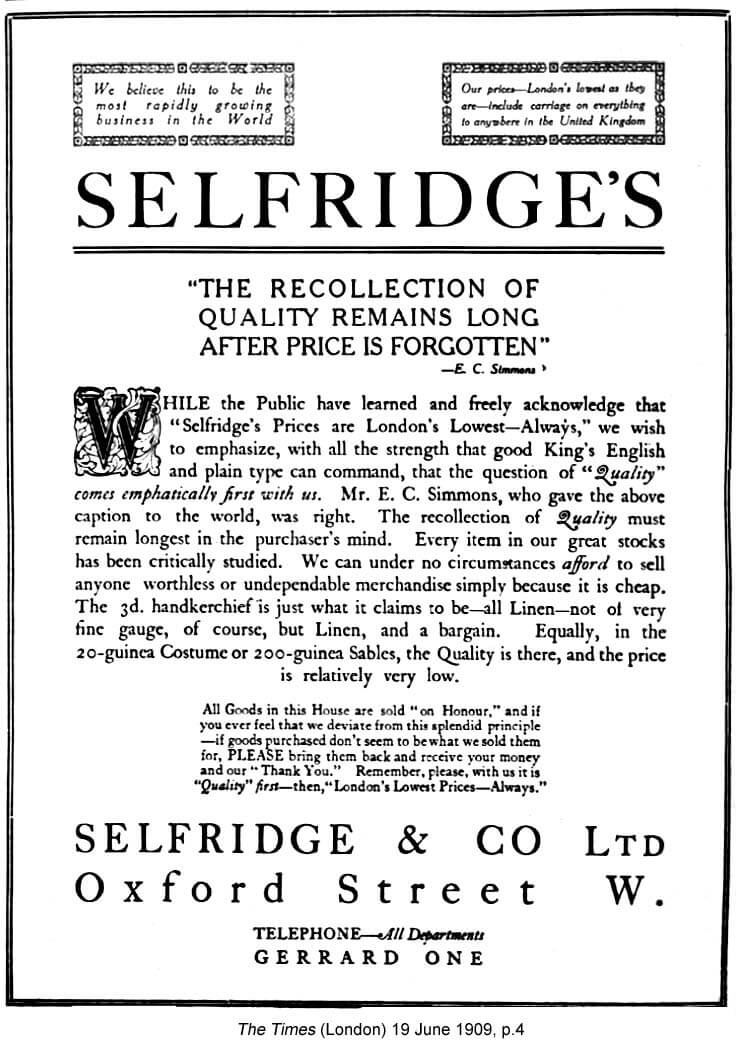
Printed three months after opening, this advertisement assured readers of not only "London's Lowest Prices—Always", but that "the question of Quality comes emphatically first", and that all goods are sold "on Honour" (with moneyback guarantee).

The influence that Harry Selfridge had on shopping and department stores was seen on Selfridges' opening day. The store’s opening on 15 March 1909 reflected the lifestyle that Selfridge aimed to promote. Before the unveiling of the window displays, marketing techniques set up the occasion and the store for operation.

Harry Selfridge developed close relationships with the media to ensure that his store and its opening were properly publicized. The opening week ad campaign relied mainly on unpaid promotions in the form of news articles in newspapers, magazines, and journals. As time progressed, Selfridge took the more traditional form of marketing by writing daily columns under the pen name Callisthenes. Overall, however, one of the most effective marketing tools proved to be the opening week cartoons focusing on the grand event. Selfridge enlisted the help of thirty-eight of London’s top illustrators to draw hundreds of full page, half page, and quarter page advertisements for eighteen newspapers.

The marketing continued on opening day itself. Touted as “London’s Greatest Store,” Selfridges immediately became a cultural and social phenomenon. From the store's soft lighting to the general absence of price tags to live music from string quartets, every detail of the opening was purposeful to draw people into the entire shopping experience and make each shopper feel unique. At Selfridges, shoppers entered another world in which they became "guests," as the store referred to them, and could purchase unique items that differed from the material goods sold in other stores.

== Controversies ==
- After protests by animal welfare advocates, in November 2009 Selfridges agreed to stop selling foie gras (a delicacy made from the livers of forcibly fattened ducks and geese).
- In July 2010, Selfridges apologized publicly after its Manchester store displayed an Alexander McQueen garment hanging from a gallows-like structure, just months after the designer committed suicide by hanging.
- In September 2013, the store suspended a shop assistant who refused to serve a friend of Tommy Robinson.
- In February 2015, one of Selfridges' stores in Manchester installed so-called anti-homeless spikes.

== In culture ==
ITV and Masterpiece produced a series entitled Mr Selfridge, which aired from 2013 to 2016.

The brand has worked with artists like Jaden Smith and others throughout its history.

== See also ==
- Bloomingdale's
