= Garda Armed Support Unit =

Irish specialist police units

- Aonad Tacaíochta faoi Airm (Irish)
- Active: 2008 (pilot); 2012 (5 regions); 2016 (Dublin region)
- Country: Ireland
- Agency: Garda Síochána
- Role: Specialist armed/tactical response; Armed airport and port patrols
- Abbreviation: ASU

Structure
- Operators: ≈ 300 (as of 2025)

Equipment
- Vehicles: BMW 5 Series; Audi Q7; Volvo XC70; BMW X5; Ford Transit; Skoda Octavia

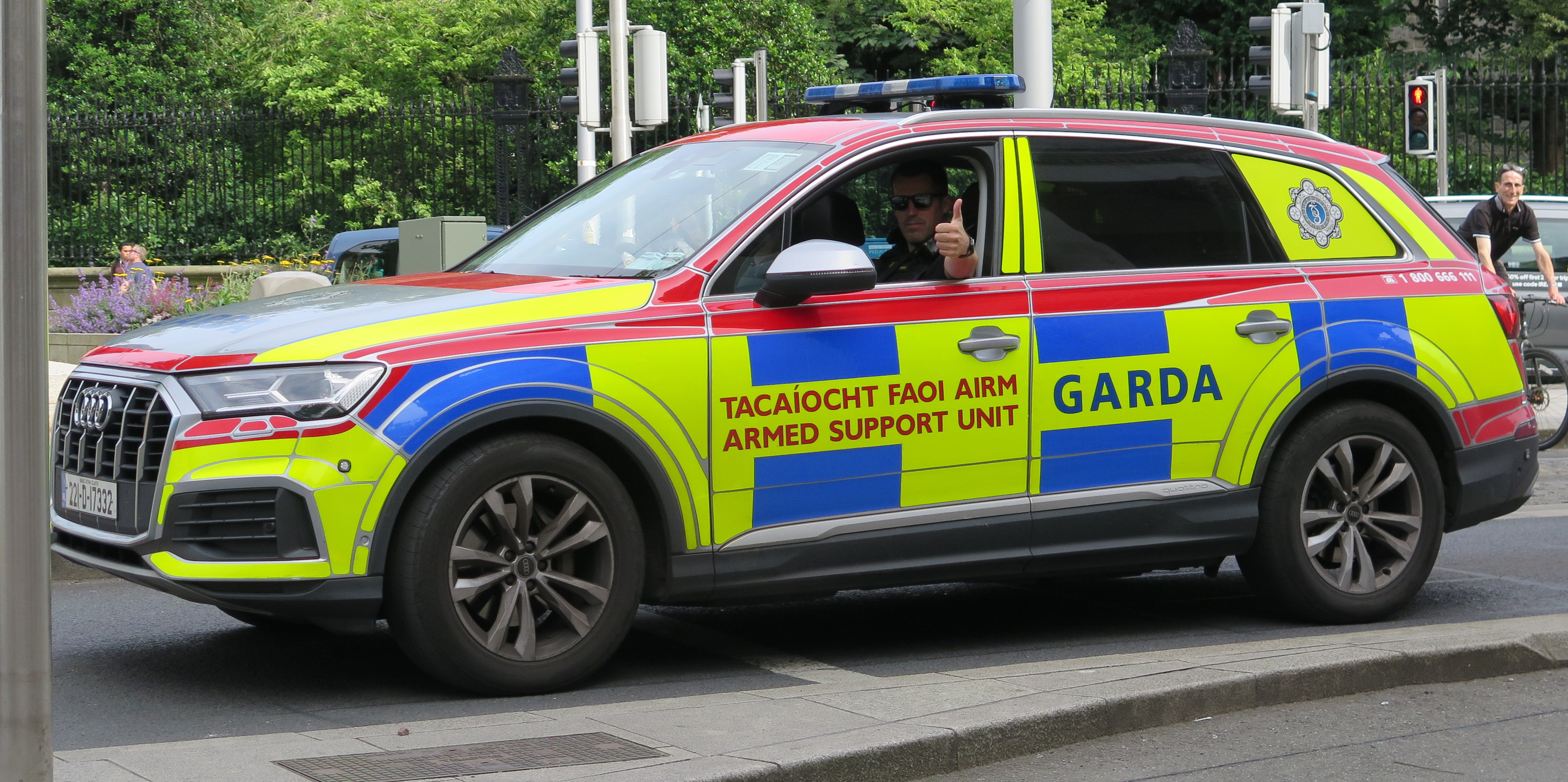
A Garda Armed Support Unit (ASU) response vehicle in 2025

Armed Support Units (ASU) (Irish: Tacaíochta Faoi Arm) are specialist regional firearms units of the Garda Síochána, the national police force of Ireland. Based in all four Garda regions in the country, Gardaí attached to an ASU unit carry a combination of lethal firearms and non-lethal weapons, as opposed to regular uniformed Gardaí, who are unarmed, and detective gardaí, who are armed but not assigned to ASU roles.

The ASU is under the command of the Special Tactics and Operational Command alongside the Garda Emergency Response Unit (ERU).

Armed Support Units were known as Regional Support Units (RSU) when first established in 2008.

== Duties ==
A Garda Armed Support Unit may be deployed to support local Garda officers in certain high-risk operations. This principally involves offering armed assistance to ordinary Gardaí who are dealing with an incident in which firearms or other weapons (knives, etc.) have been produced. It also includes:

- Confronting and disarming persons who are carrying knives or guns
- Providing tactical support to other gardaí carrying out searches
- Carrying out high visibility static and rolling checkpoints and other operations to counteract the movements of criminals
- Overt armed airport and port patrols to counter terrorist attacks

== Background ==
The first Regional Support Unit (RSU) was formed in 2008, following recommendations made by the Barr Tribunal, which brought the existence and role of the Emergency Response Unit (ERU) to public attention (April 2000, see Death of John Carthy), and questioned the Dublin-based unit's ability to reach other areas of the country quickly.

Regional Support Units were originally assigned to support five individual Garda regions – administrative areas drawn on geographical lines which at the time were made up of the Eastern, Northern, Southern, South-Eastern and Western regions and have since been amalgamated into the Southern, Eastern, Northwestern and Dublin Metropolitan regions – but not the Dublin Metropolitan Region (DMR), which had remained the sole responsibility of the ERU. The first RSU was formed on a pilot basis in the Southern Region (the administrative area which at the time consisted of counties Cork, Limerick and Kerry).

As of 2012, RSU units began operating on a full-time permanent armed basis in the Eastern, Northern, Southern, South-Eastern and Western regions after a trial period. Serious incidents such as barricaded sieges, hostage takings or terrorism can result in the deployment of the ERU.

In February 2016, it was decided that a Regional Support Unit should be established in the Dublin Metropolitan Region (DMR) to counteract the growing threat of gangland drug crime and terrorism risks. Previously the Dublin Garda region had been provided with tactical support by the Emergency Response Unit. As part of this process, the term Regional Support Unit was replaced by the term Armed Support Unit (ASU). The ASU was established in December 2016.

The Dublin ASU began operating in early 2016 with a complement of 55-60 full-time armed officers, including 5 sergeants. The Dublin-based unit is equipped with marked and unmarked vehicles, and was officially launched in late 2016.

In April 2016, it was confirmed that Armed Support Units would be deployed overtly to patrol both Dublin Airport and Dublin Port full-time on foot inside terminal buildings and via vehicles outside and surrounding the perimeter, carrying personal defense weapons, sidearms, tasers and other specialist equipment to counter the rising threat of terrorist attacks in Europe.

In March 2018, the ASU participated in anti-terrorist drills at Shannon Airport with the Irish Defence Forces and the Emergency Response Unit.

During the first six months of 2022, the ASU did not use their firearms at any time. They used a single "SIR-X" rubber bullet on one occasion.

== Training and manpower ==
Garda ASU officers undergo training over a thirteen-week period, which includes instruction in:

- Critical incident response
- Tactical deployment
- Conflict resolution
- Negotiation techniques
- Deployment protocols and controls
- Dynamic entry methods
- Tactical driving
- First aid
- Use of less lethal options and firearms
- Other relevant skills.

The Garda ERU are responsible for ASU training. Some ASU officers later go on to join the ERU. ASU membership consists exclusively of serving officers in the Garda Síochána, who must have at least 4 years experience and a clean disciplinary record.

In of 2016, there were Armed Support Units in all six regions, each with at least 24 members (Dublin having 55 to 60 members), putting the overall manpower at more than 175.

In October 2025, the Irish Times journalist Conor Lally reported on a two-night deployment he spent embedded with the Dublin ASU as it patrolled the city and responded to incidents. In the article, he stated that the ASUs deploy from 12 centres across the four Garda regions (Dublin Metropolitan Region, Eastern Region, Southern Region and Northwestern Region) and that there may be up to 300 members throughout the country at any one time. Lally stated that, as of 2025, the "Dublin ASU comprises four teams of 15 members each, which work 12-hour shifts every day. There is one female member".

The command of each Armed Support Unit is given to a Detective Superintendent in each geographic region, except in Dublin where the Dublin ASU is under the command of the Garda's Special Tactics and Operations Command (STOC). The STOC, which has "a governance role for the ASUs located outside of Dublin", is based in Kevin Street Garda Station.

== Notable incidents ==
On 30 December 2020, a member of the Dublin ASU shot and killed George Nkencho in front of his west Dublin home after graduated attempts to disarm him failed. The Garda Síochána Ombudsman Commission launched an investigation into the circumstances of his death.

On 23 November 2023, members of the Garda Public Order Unit (POU) and the ASU were sent into a riot in Dublin, they were positioned as a police cordon around Leinster House and key government buildings.

On 16 August 2024, ASU officers responded to a stabbing incident at Renmore Barracks.

== Equipment ==
=== Weapons ===
Members of the Armed Support Units are equipped similarly to members of the Special Detective Unit (SDU) and Emergency Response Unit.

ASU weapons include;

- SIG Sauer P226 DAO 9mm semi-automatic pistol
- Heckler & Koch MP7A1 personal defense weapon (with ammunition that can penetrate body armour)
- Benelli M4 Super 90 semi-automatic shotgun

ASU units also carry less-lethal weapons, such as;

- Taser 7
- Brügger & Thomet GL06
- Pepper sprays
- Bean bag rounds (used along with shotgun)

=== Vehicles ===
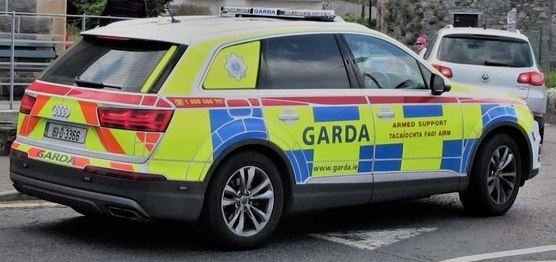
Garda Armed Support Unit vehicle in 2017

Armed Support Units operate Volvo V70 XC70 (police variant) and Audi Q7 vehicles. Also introduced in late 2016 were BMW 5 Series Touring vehicles, costing €70,000 each with a top speed of 233 km/h (145 mph), replacing the older fleet of XC70s. In late 2017 BMW X5s were also introduced, along with one Ford Transit tactical support van.

The ASU vehicles are specially modified and distinguishable from other Garda vehicles by battenburg markings, the words "ARMED SUPPORT UNIT" on the doors and a distinctive red stripe along each side. The Volvo XC70s featured a light bar on the roof with an illuminated red message scroller bearing the term "GARDA ARMED SUPPORT UNIT", however newer vehicles feature a low profile light bar and XC70s in service in Dublin have been refitted with a more standard light bar. Older vehicles have been remarked to match the current style (original vehicles did not feature the red stripe and had a different, slightly less bright reflective pattern).

Patrol vehicles contain an equipment drawer and shelves in the boot to carry weapons and other tactical equipment.
