= Simone Rocha =

Irish fashion designer

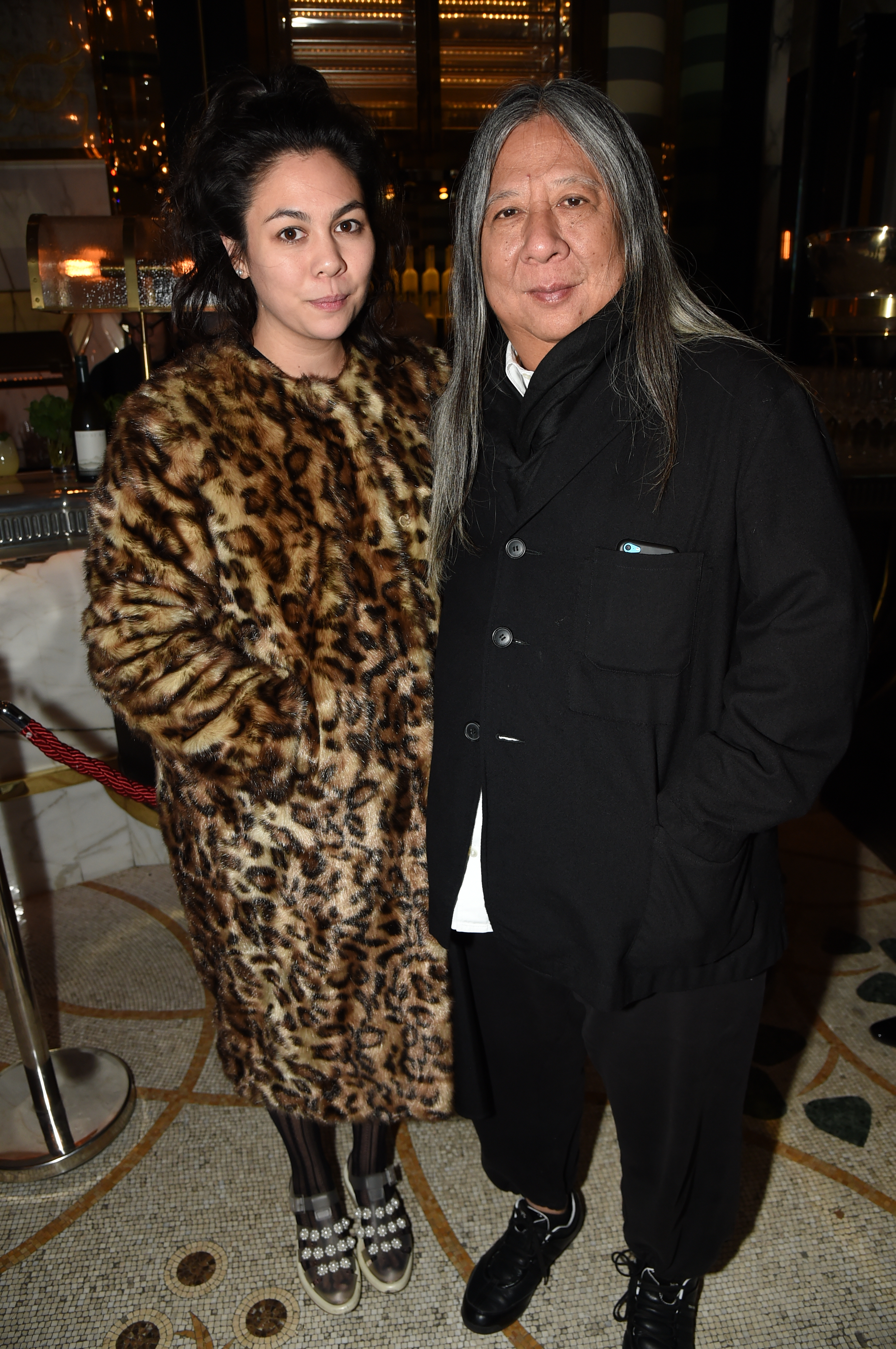
- Simone Rocha and her father, John Rocha, in 2014
- Born: September 11, 1986 (age 40); Dublin, Ireland
- Education: National College of Art and Design; Central Saint Martins
- Occupation: Fashion designer
- Partner: Eoin McLoughlin
- Children: 2
- Father: John Rocha
- Website: www.simonerocha.com

Simone Rocha (born 11 September 1986) is an Irish fashion designer. Her father is a fashion designer John Rocha. She trained at the National College of Art and Design and Central Saint Martins, launching her graduate collection in 2010 at the Tate Modern and London Fashion Week.

She was named Young Designer of the Year in 2014 by Harper's Bazaar, and Womenswear Designer of the Year 2016 at the British Fashion Awards.

== Early life and education ==
Rocha was born in Dublin, Ireland, on 11 September 1986. Her father, John Rocha, is a fashion designer. She attended her first fashion show as an infant. She later said she felt it was "inevitable" that she would follow in her father's career, adding that fashion was "100 per cent a part of my life".

Rocha worked at her father's studio between the ages of 13 and 18. She trained at the National College of Art and Design in Dublin. Before attending NCAD, she struggled in school due to dyslexia; in 2021 she said, "the only place I felt really good was in art class".

For her MA, she studied under Louise Wilson, who ran the fashion department at Central Saint Martins in London. Rocha showed her graduate collection at the Tate Modern gallery, and at London Fashion Week in 2010.

== Career ==
Following London Fashion Week in 2010, Rocha had a pop-up within the Dover Street Market store, which was located on Dover Street, and continues to have one within their new store in Haymarket. Her lines were also stocked by Paris-based boutique Colette. In August 2015, she opened her first standalone boutique on London's Mount Street. Since then, Rocha has opened stores in New York, London and Taiwan.

Rocha has held a fashion show every fall and spring since 2012. In 2018, Rocha collaborated with Moncler, an Italian luxury fashion company, as part of their Genius Collection series. In March 2021, Rocha collaborated with H&M. In 2023, she designed the Met Gala look for Billie Eilish. In January 2024, Rocha was invited as a guest designer to present Haute Couture collection for Jean Paul Gaultier.

== Style ==
Rocha's work modernises Elizabethan and Victorian silhouettes as she uses traditional components such as pearls, lace, patchwork and handwork alongside pink neoprene. She has incorporated influences of her Irish and Chinese heritage into her designs. Rocha expanded her line to menswear in 2023.

== Awards ==
- Emerging Talent, Ready-to-Wear at the British Fashion Awards in 2013.
- The New Establishment Award at the British Fashion Awards in 2014.
- Young Designer of the Year by Harper's Bazaar in 2014.
- British Womenswear Designer of the Year at the British Fashion Awards.
- Designer of the Year at the Stylist's Remarkable Women Awards in 2022.
- Independent British Brand at the Fashion Awards in 2021.

== Personal life ==
Rocha is married to cinematographer and photographer Eoin McLoughlin. They have collaborated on campaigns and films for her brand. McLoughlin has also directed a documentary-style film for her Fall 2021 Ready-to-Wear collection. Rocha and McLoughlin have two children. In 2021, she discussed how motherhood has shaped her designs.
