= Orion Building =

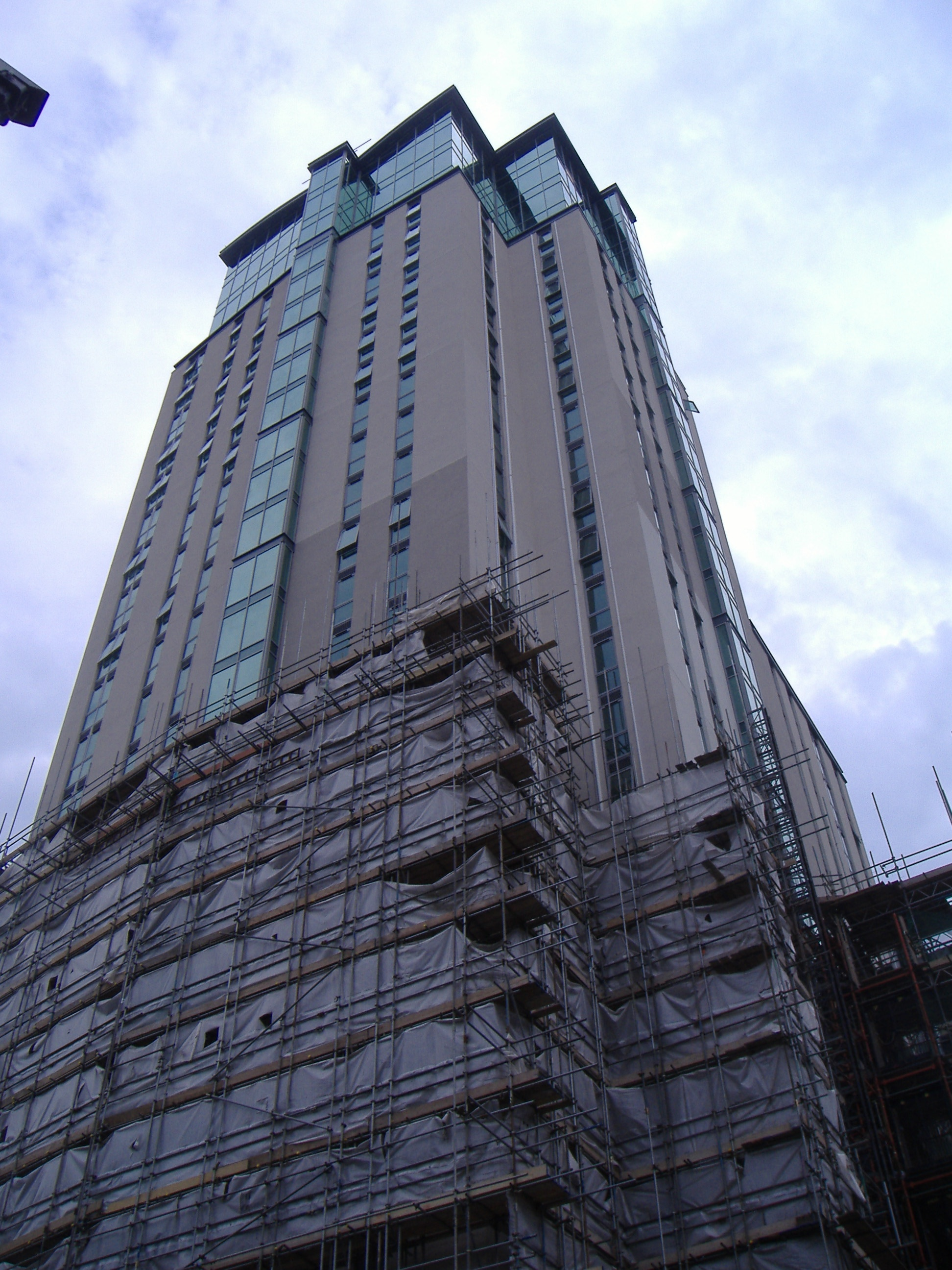
- The Orion Building, Birmingham City Centre
- Interactive map of the Orion Building area

General information
- Type: Residential and retail
- Location: Birmingham, England
- Coordinates: 52°28′38.95″N 1°54′8.47″W
- Construction started: 2004
- Completed: 2006

Height
- Height: 90 metres (295 ft)

Technical details
- Floor count: 28

Design and construction
- Architect: BBLB Architects
- Other designers: John Rocha

The Orion Building is a 90-metre (295 ft) tall high rise residential building on Navigation Street, Birmingham 5, England. Construction of the tower began in 2004 with demolition of the previous building on the site, and was completed in 2007. As part of the development, the original façades of some of the previous buildings have been retained and incorporated into the lowrise sections of the complex. The complex consists of a 28-storey tower with five basement floors. It includes the city's first penthouse which was sold for £1.65 million. The fourth and final phase of the building, being marketed as 'Sirius', is nearing completion.

== Planning history ==
The first planning application for the Orion Building was submitted on 3 December 2001 to Birmingham City Council. It was approved on 25 April 2002. Soon after gaining planning permission, the scheme encountered problems. The original contractor, Carillion, fell out with Crosby Homes and construction on the site stopped. Carillion quit their involvement on the scheme and Taylor Woodrow took over with construction recommencing soon after. Before construction of phases 1 and 2 commenced, all of the 150 apartments had been sold. The next planning application was submitted on 10 October 2002 for the second phase of the scheme. It was approved on July 8, 2003. Another planning application was submitted for the reuse of 93-97 John Bright Street, a listed building, as apartments and retail. It was submitted on 25 June 2004 and was approved on 2 October 2005. On 5 October 2004 Crosby Homes submitted a planning application to add another four floors to the tower and another storey to the block adjacent to it. Alterations were also made to the layouts of the apartments between floors 10 and 19 to provide a further 29 flats. The planning application was approved on 16 December 2004. The building was constructed in three phases with Phase 1 being the corner on Navigation Street and John Bright Street and the John Bright Street frontage. Phase 2 is a low rise element to the complex that fronts on to Navigation Street whilst Phase 3 is the main tower overlooking Suffolk Street Queensway.

== Features ==
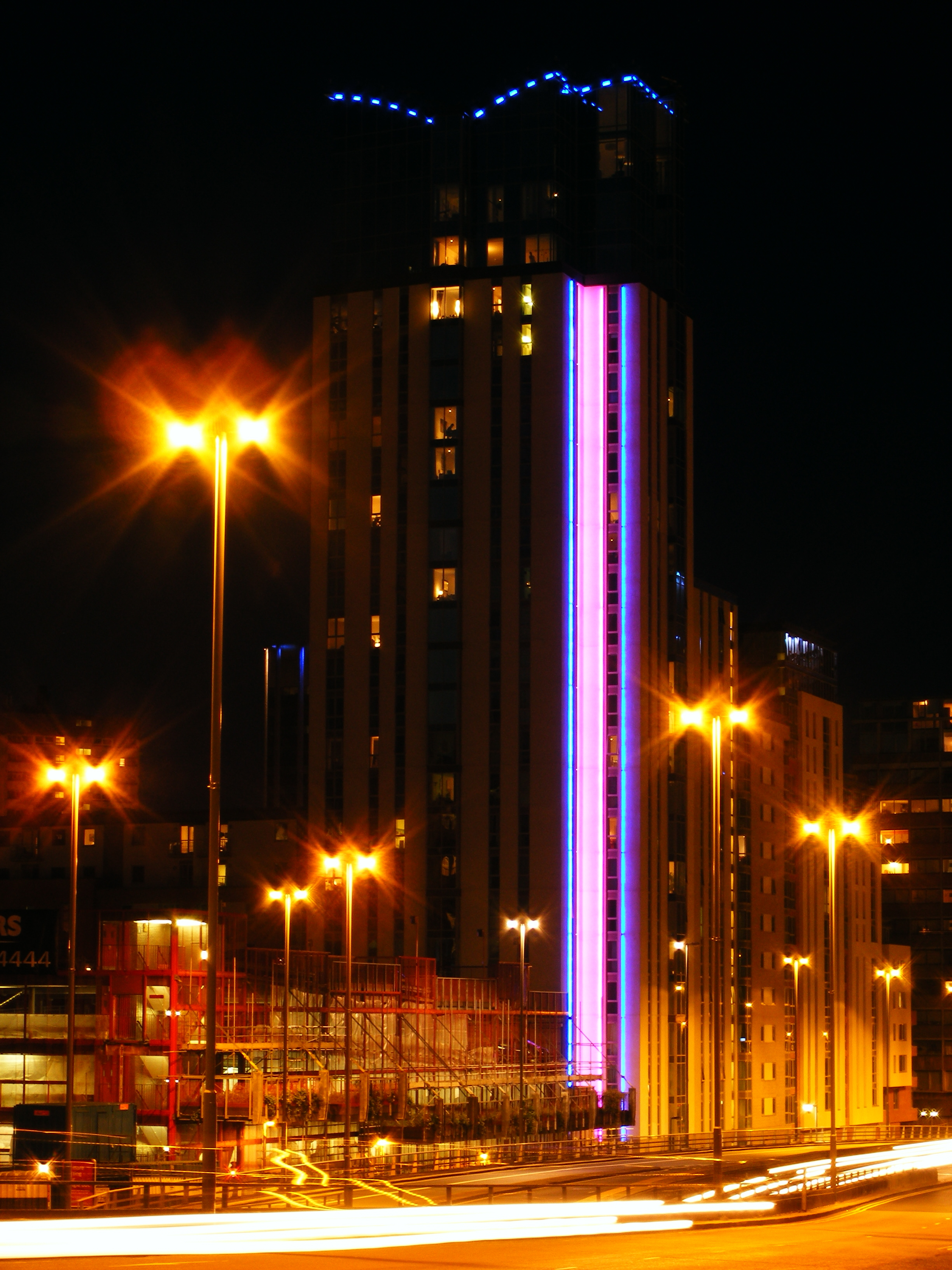
Night view of the Orion Building

The 200 apartments within the complex have been designed by John Rocha, the fashion designer, who claims it as a "fashion first". On the ground floor, there are four retail units, one of which is occupied by Sainsbury's Local.

The tower is illuminated at night by strips of LEDs.

The top part of the tower is completely glass. Below this, the tower consists of strips of glass set within pre-cast concrete panels. The pre-cast concrete panels were painted in varying tones of beige after the construction. The reason for this was unknown, however in December 2006 these patches were painted over in a single colour.

The final phase of the Orion scheme, is currently under construction. It is being marketed separate to the Orion Building and is named 'Sirius'. As of August 2008, the scaffolding and sheeting covering the façade of the structure are being removed. The construction of Sirius was aided by two tower cranes. The complex will consist of 182 one and two bedroom apartments and 8,240 square feet (766 m^{2}) in five retail units. It incorporates the Victorian façade of 99 John Bright Street. The scheme is estimated to cost £35 million.

== Criticism ==
The architecture of the Orion Building has been attacked by critics. It was nominated for the 2007 Carbuncle Cup, and The Times newspaper named it as one of the ugliest new buildings in Britain in August 2007.

== Views of the Orion Building ==
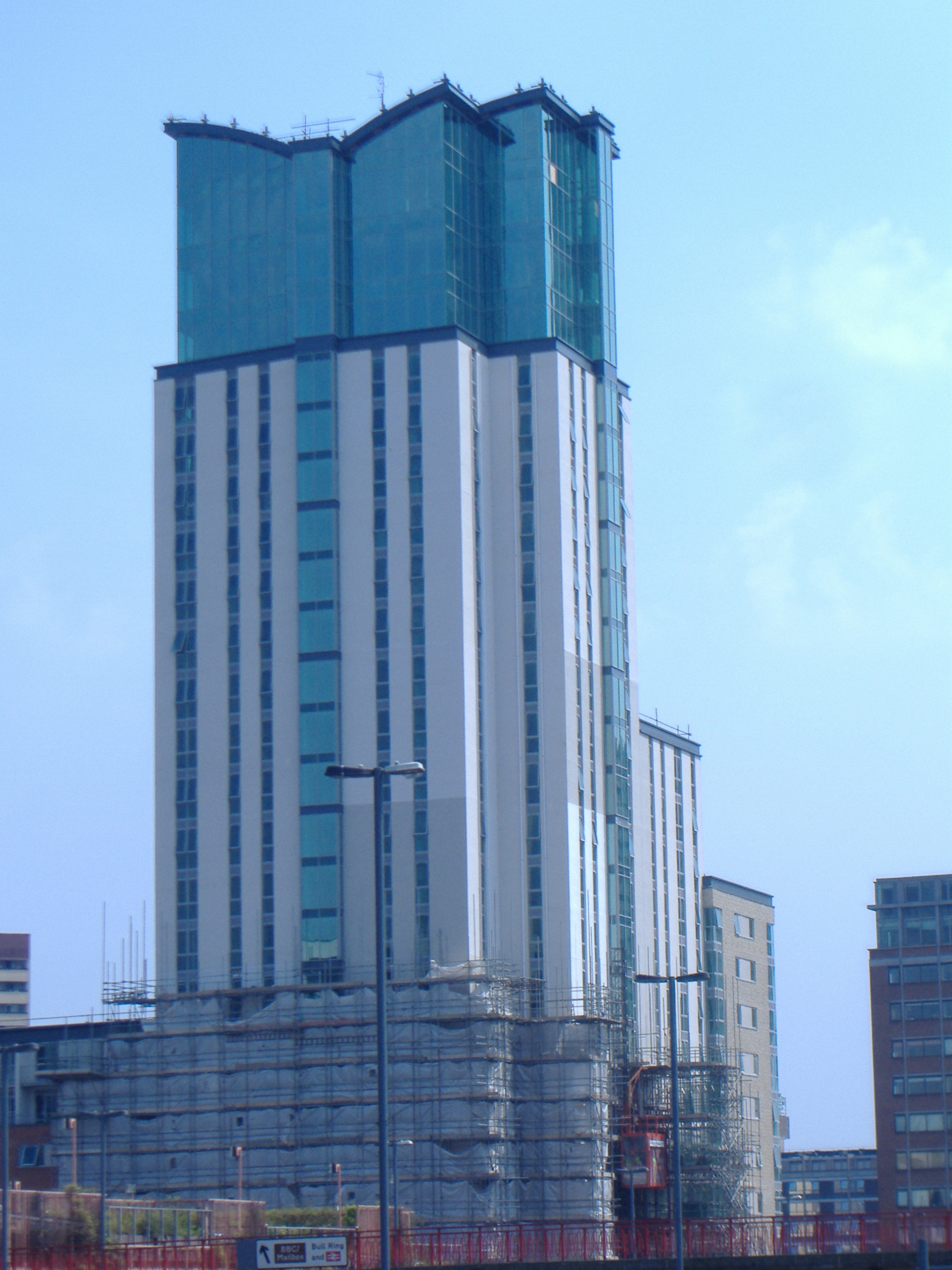
The main tower of the Orion Building during the removal of scaffolding.

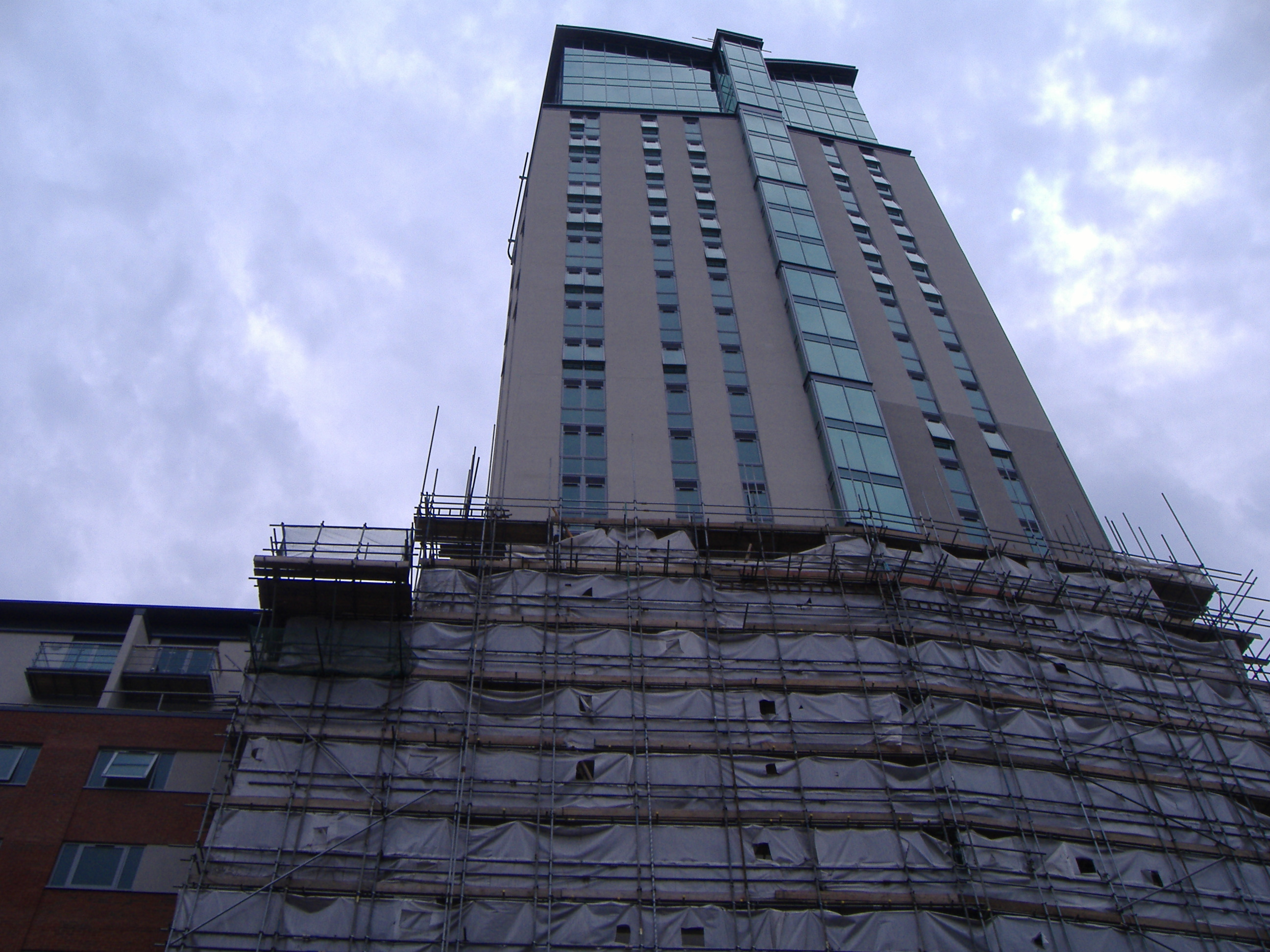
The Orion Building from ground level.

== See also ==
- List of tallest buildings and structures in Birmingham
