= Selfridges Group =

Retail group in Europe

- Industry: Retail
- Genre: Department stores
- Founded: 2003; 23 years ago
- Areas served: Ireland; the Netherlands; United Kingdom
- Owner: Central Group (60%); Public Investment Fund (40%)
- Parent: Central Group
- Website: selfridgesgroup.com

Selfridges Group is a holding company of European department stores, itself owned by the Thai conglomerate Central Group and the Saudi Arabian Public Investment Fund. It operates the full-line stores Arnotts and Brown Thomas in Ireland, De Bijenkorf in the Netherlands, and Selfridges in the United Kingdom. The company previously owned the Canadian department stores Holt Renfrew and Ogilvy, both of which the Weston family retained in the acquisition.

Signa Holding's 40-percent stake in the acquisition was acquired by the Saudi Arabia Public Investment Fund in 2024. The acquired stores are controlled by the department store division of Central Group, which is the majority owner with 60 percent.

== History ==
Selfridges Group, along with KaDeWe Group, is owned by Thailand's Central Group, which acquired them in 2021 jointly with Austria-based Signa Holding, which lost joint control in late 2023. Shareholders successfully ousted Signa Holding's founder, René Benko, who was pressured to relinquish his voting rights amid financial turmoil. The group traces its origins to the Weston family, an Irish-Canadian business dynasty that controls Wittington Investments (UK). In 2003, Galen Weston Sr. acquired the Selfridges department store chain, subsequently integrating it with other high-end retailers including Brown Thomas and Arnotts in Ireland, and De Bijenkorf in the Netherlands, to form the Selfridges Group.

Before becoming an independent listed company in 1998, Selfridges was part of the Sears plc retail conglomerate (not related to the American Sears). Sears had owned Selfridges since 1965, when Charles Clore's business bought it.

In October 2024, following Signa's collapse, Saudi Arabia's Public Investment Fund (PIF) acquired Signa's stake and formed a new strategic partnership with Central Group; under this arrangement Central Group owns 60% and PIF 40% of both the operating and property companies.

Central Group has since directed significant redevelopment efforts—including the transformation of the Selfridges Beauty Hall on Oxford Street, renovations at Brown Thomas in Dublin, and the men's department at De Bijenkorf in Amsterdam—and reported group sales of over £2.8 billion in the most recent fiscal year.

== Nameplates ==
List of Selfridges Group nameplates
Name	Year founded	Year acquired	Notes
Arnotts	1843	2015	
Brown Thomas	1848	1983 (Note: Acquired by Wittington Investments before the establishment of the Selfridges Group)	
De Bijenkorf	1870	2011	
Holt Renfrew	1837	1986	Retained by Weston family in 2022
Ogilvy	1866	2011	Co-branded with Holt Renfrew in 2019, retained by Weston family in 2022
Selfridges	1908	2003	
