= Arnotts (Irish department store) =

Irish department store

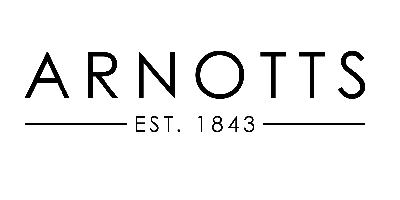

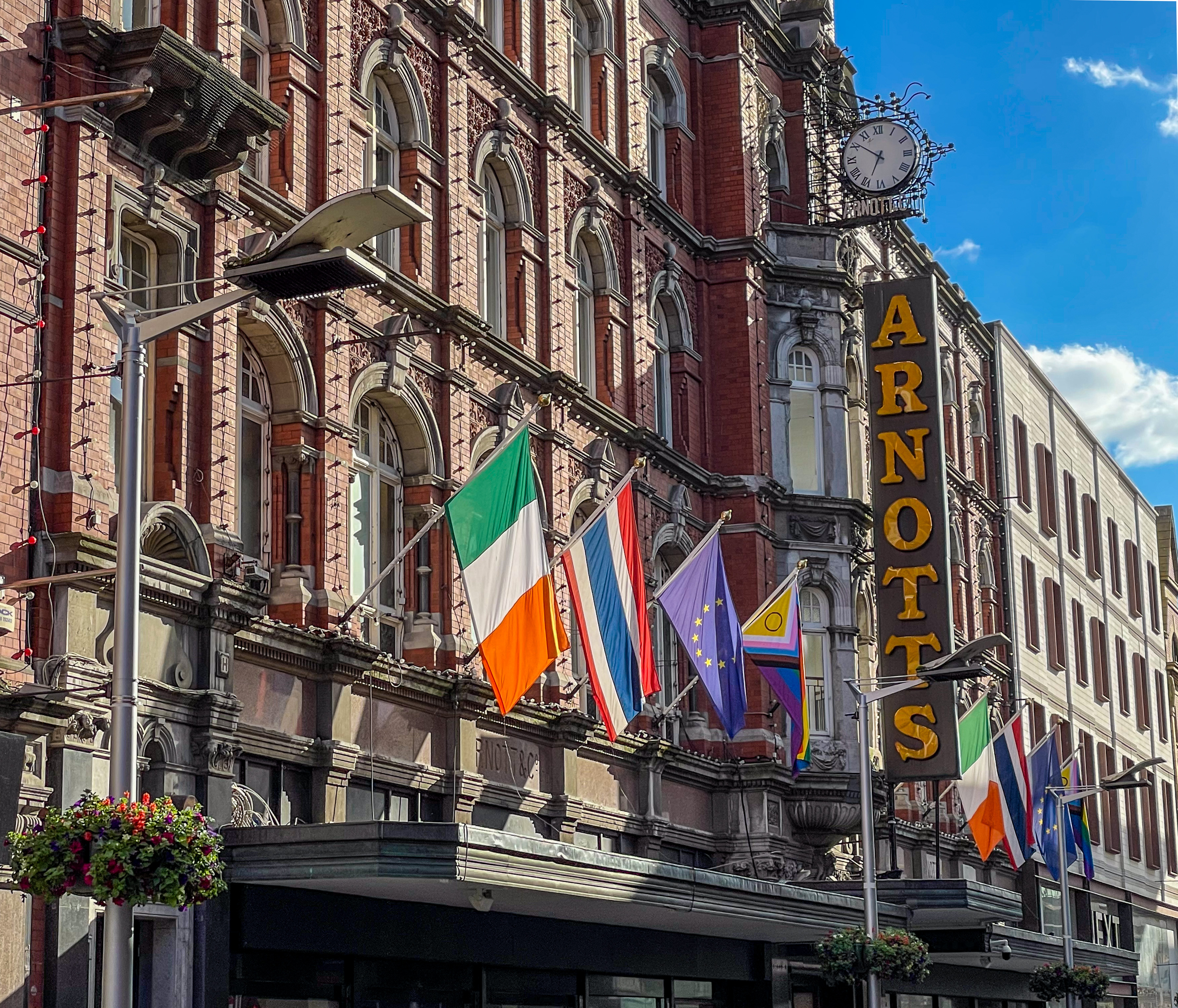
- Exterior of Arnotts (2024)
- Interactive map of the Arnotts area

General information
- Status: Open
- Type: Department store
- Architectural style: Victorian with Gothic elements
- Location: 12 Henry Street, Dublin, Leinster, Ireland
- Coordinates: 53.3491°N 6.2630°W
- Named for: John Arnott
- Year built: 1890–1894
- Opened: 1895; 131 years ago
- Owner: Selfridges Group

Technical details
- Floor count: 7
- Floor area: 300,000 square feet (28,000 m^{2}) of selling space

Design and construction
- Architect: G.P. Beater

Website
- arnotts.ie

National monument of Ireland
- Designated: 24 October 2011
- Reference no.: 50010470

Arnotts is a department store on Henry Street in Dublin, Ireland. It was designed by G.P. Beater for John Arnott, and opened in 1895. It replaced an earlier store founded by George Cannock, Andrew White, and Andrew and Patrick Reid in 1845, which had burned down in 1894. The store is owned by the Selfridges Group, which itself is jointly owned by the Thai conglomerate Central Group and Saudi Arabian Public Investment Fund. It is sister stores with the Brown Thomas, De Bijenkorf, and Selfridges department stores through this ownership.

== History ==
Arnotts has its origins in a business founded in 1843 at 14 Henry Street, by George Cannock and Andrew White. In 1845, two bankers, Andrew and Patrick Reid, became partners in the business. In 1848, White died, and the Scottish entrepreneur John Arnott took shares in the company. In 1865, Cannock departed the business, and the business was renamed as Arnott's.

Arnotts occupies much of the block behind the GPO to the west of O'Connell Street, between Henry Street and Abbey Street, covering an area of some 300,000 square feet. The original building was completely destroyed in a fire on 4 May 1894, and was reconstructed in the following year. It was registered as a private company on 18 April 1895. The main entrance is on the pedestrianised Henry Street.

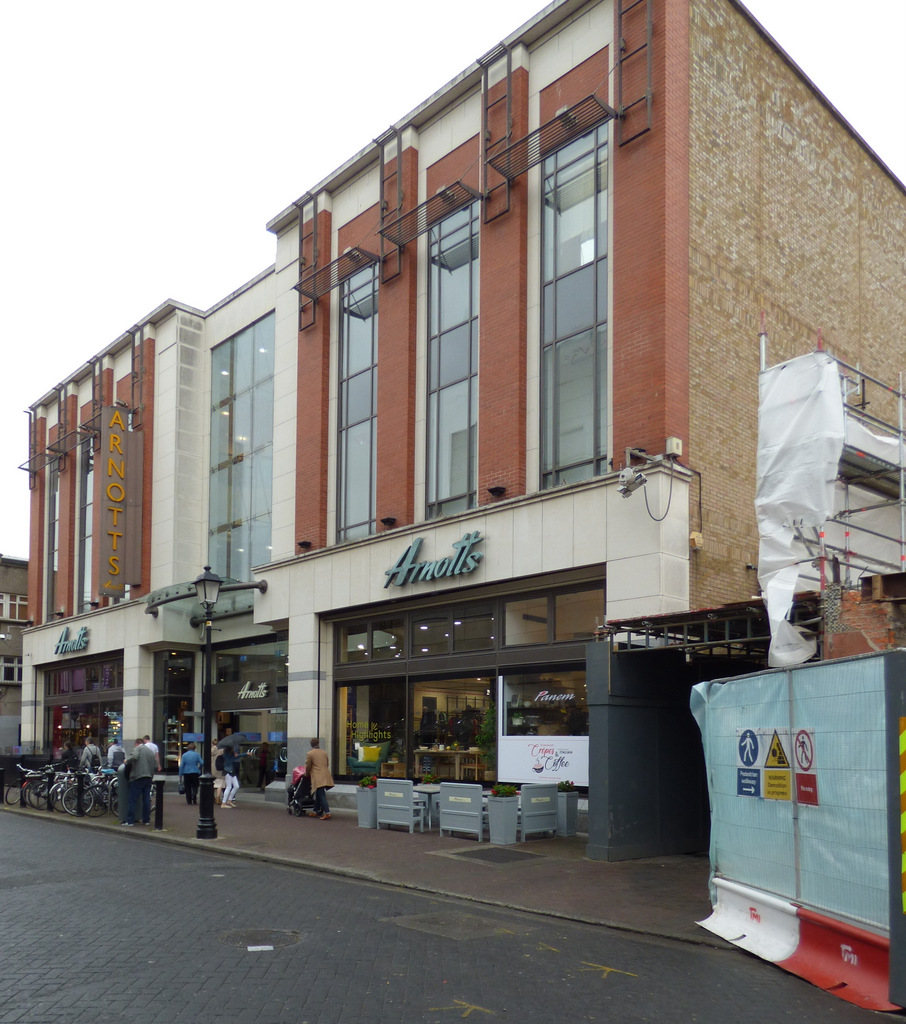
Arnotts' Liffey Street entrance

In 2006, the then-owner of Arnotts, Nesbitt Acquisitions, announced plans to redevelop their properties located between O'Connell Street and Liffey Street, incorporating Independent House, the former Independent Newspapers building on Abbey Street. The new development was to be called the Northern Quarter and was to be one of the largest rejuvenation projects to ever be undertaken in this area of the city centre. The estimated cost of the project was €750,000,000. As part of this project, it was intended to move the department store to a nearby former Debenhams Ireland branch in the Jervis Shopping Centre, but as plans changed this opened as "Arnotts Project"; which operated for less than a year before being surrendered back to the landlord.

Following planning difficulties and the financial crisis in Ireland, the project never went ahead. Arnotts incurred large debts in acquiring property.

Arnotts was one of the longest-standing sponsors of GAA until 2009, when its 18-year partnership as sponsor of Dublin GAA came to an end.

In July 2010, Arnotts was taken over by Anglo Irish Bank and Ulster Bank, due to large outstanding loans on its failed "Northern Quarter" property development. The previous owner, Nesbitt Acquisitions, comprising about 50 members of the Nesbitt family led by Richard Nesbitt, retained one per cent of the business.

A footwear-only branch of Arnotts was located in the Stillorgan Shopping Centre until 2011, with a former branch on Grafton Street initially changed to be branded as a River Island, before being sold in 2003.

On 2 November 2015, the store was taken over by Selfridges, a chain of department stores, and now trades as a sister store to Brown Thomas which is part of the same group.

Across O'Connell Street in North Earl Street was its sister store, Boyers & Co, which closed down on 31 January 2016.

On 24 December 2021 it was announced that the Selfridges company had been sold to a joint venture between Thai Central Group and Signa Holding in Austria for $5.37 billion, a deal which included Arnotts as well as the Brown Thomas chain and De Bijenkorf in the Netherlands.

In late 2023, Signa Holding went bankrupt. In October 2024, Saudi Arabia's Public Investment Fund (PIF) acquired Signa's 40% stake in Selfridges Group. As a result, Central Group holds 60%, and PIF 40%, making them joint owners of Arnotts.

In May 2026, Yves Sakila died after being restrained by security staff at the department store, this incident attracted widespread coverage in Irish and international news.

=== Scottish business ===
In 1850, John Arnott opened a drapery shop on Jamaica Street, Glasgow, Scotland. In 1864, the business purchased the building in which the shop was located. It went on to expand the shop, and by 1874, it had developed into a department store.

During 1886, the partnership between Arnott and Cannock was dissolved. John Arnott's half-brother, Thomas Arnott, continued to operate the department store as Arnott and Company. The Scottish business was incorporated in 1891. In 1936, Fraser, Sons & Co Ltd bought the business but continued to trade under the Arnott and Company brand. In 1938, it was merged with the neighbouring business, Robert Simpson & Sons Ltd, to create Arnott Simpson Ltd, with the two stores being reconstructed into one. In 1947, Arnott Simpson Ltd was liquidated, with the business being subsumed into its parent, House of Fraser, although the business continued to trade as Arnott Simpson.

Further department stores acquired by House of Fraser in Scotland were re-branded as Arnotts for the majority of its stores throughout Scotland. The Arnotts brand disappeared from Scotland when House of Fraser closed the last remaining department store using the Arnotts brand (in Paisley) in January 2004.
