= A Wear =

Irish women's clothing store chain

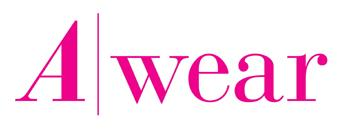
- Company type: A Wear
- Industry: Fashion; Clothing; Textiles
- Genre: Retail
- Founded: 1970s
- Defunct: 2014
- Headquarters: Grafton Street, Dublin, Ireland
- Area served: Ireland; Great Britain
- Products: Women's retail fashion
- Website: Official Website

A Wear was a chain of women's clothing stores with a wide number of operations across Ireland. The brand also operated internationally through its website and a number of units in Great Britain. It ceased trading in January 2014.

== Ownership ==
The business was established under the brand name, 'Gaywear', opening its first shop in Limerick in 1966. The business expanded nationwide in 1973 when Galen Weston's retail empire invested in the company. In 1985, it was rebranded as A Wear. Until 2007, it was owned by Brown Thomas.

In May 2007, a consortium led by Alchemy Partners purchased the company for €70 million from the Brown Thomas Group.

In late 2011, due to the continued economic downturn and high retail rents in the Ireland, Alchemy Partners announced it was to go into receivership.

On 17 October 2011, Hilco Groups's Hilco Capital Ireland Ltd purchased the company and its debt. On 15 February 2012, Hilco placed A Wear into receivership.

On 16 February 2012 it was confirmed that A Wear's operations in Ireland had been purchased out of receivership by an international consortium headed by Michael Flacks of Flacks Group, with the intention of continuing to operate the 32 shops in Ireland with possible expansion.

In 2013, A Wear re-entered the British retail market after going into receivership in December 2011. It initially operated its clothing range from 10 House of Fraser stores in Great Britain only, with plans to open its own stand-alone stores in autumn-winter 2013.

In October 2013, A Wear confirmed that its parent company had entered examinership.

On 28 November 2013, the company entered receivership. By early December, a number of its shops in Dublin and Sligo were reopened. On the week beginning 9 December, it reopened its shops in Blanchardstown, Castlebar, Limerick (Crescent SC), Galway, Grafton Street, Dundrum, Liffey Valley Shopping Centre, Sligo and Swords. All other units remained closed. Its large shops on St Patrick's Street, Cork and Mahon Point did not reopen, nor did its online business.

After failing to exit examinership successfully on Thursday 28 November 2013, all A Wear shops in the Republic of Ireland ceased operation after the appointment of Kavanagh Fennell as receiver by Chelsey Investissement SA. Its concession units in the United Kingdom also ceased operations. 300 jobs were at risk. The appointed receiver noted that some shops would remain closed, with the possibility of retaining more profitable units, with the aim to sell these shops to a suitable buyer. Its loss-making online business also ceased trading at that time.

The remaining shops closed during the period from 24 December 2013 to 11 January 2014, when the final unit shut its doors.

== Clothing range ==
Previous fashion designers who have designed for A Wear include John Rocha, Quin and Donnelly, Marc O'Neill and Peter O'Brien. Prior to 2000, the Irish shops also had a range of men's clothing.

== Former locations ==
=== Ireland ===
- Antrim
- Armagh
- Blanchardstown
- Carlow
- Castlebar
- Cork
- Down
- Dublin
- Dundrum
- Dún Laoghaire
- Galway
- Grafton Street
- Kerry
- Kildare
- Letterkenny
- Liffey Valley
- Limerick (2 stores + 1 in Crescent SC)
- Navan
- Newry
- Offaly
- Sligo
- Swords
- Tallaght (The Square SC)
- Tipperary
- Waterford
- Wexford

==== Great Britain ====
- Glasgow (Scotland)
- Bristol (England)
- Leicestershire (England)
- Staffordshire (England)
- Swansea (Wales)
