= Killing of Tony Timpa =

2016 homicide of a man in Texas police custody

- Frame from police body camera showing Timpa being held to the ground
- Date: August 10, 2016; 10 years ago
- Location: Dallas, Texas, US
- Type: Homicide, police brutality
- Participants: Dustin Dillard; Kevin Mansell, Danny Vasquez (other officers)
- Deaths: Anthony "Tony" Allen Timpa, aged 32
- Charges: None
- Litigation: Three officers found liable, Timpa's son awarded $1 million for wrongful death

On August 10, 2016, Anthony "Tony" Allen Timpa, a 32-year-old, unarmed man, was killed in Dallas, Texas by police officer Dustin Dillard. Officers had responded to a call by Timpa requesting aid for a mental breakdown due to the fact that he had not taken his prescription medication for schizophrenia and depression. Dillard pushed his body weight onto Timpa on the ground for around 14 minutes after he was already restrained, and officers ignored pleas from Timpa that he was in pain and was afraid he was going to die. Timpa's death was ruled a homicide due to "the stress of being restrained and extreme physical exertion" and toxic effects of previous cocaine use.

No criminal charges have been filed, but in 2021, a judge ruled that a wrongful death lawsuit filed by Timpa's family had merit and could go to trial. The civil trial concluded in September 2023, with the jury awarding Timpa's son $1 million.

== Background ==
Timpa was a 32-year-old American trucking company executive from Rockwall, Texas. He had called 9-1-1 for aid, telling the dispatcher that he had schizophrenia and depression but had not taken his prescription medication. He also stated that he had taken cocaine.

According to an autopsy conducted three days after Timpa's death, he had 0.647 milligrams per litre of cocaine in his body. The chief medical examiner of Dallas County described it as a significant amount.

== Incident ==
Timpa had already been handcuffed by a security guard when a group of officers arrived. They restrained him on the ground while he squirmed, repeatedly crying out, "You're gonna kill me!" After he fell unconscious, the officers joked about the situation and mocked Timpa. One officer remarked, "Is he asleep?", and an officer made comments about waking up for breakfast and going to school in the morning. The officers did not check for signs of life before the arrival of paramedics. They kept him prone on grass for nearly 14 minutes and zip-tied his legs together, one pressing his knee into Timpa's back. One of the paramedics called to the scene administered the sedative Versed. The responders loaded Timpa's body onto a gurney, one exclaiming, "He didn't just die down there, did he?" Timpa died within 20 minutes of police officers' arrival due to "cocaine and the stress associated with physical restraint," according to his autopsy.

== Legal proceedings ==
It took over three years for footage of the incident to be released. The footage contradicted claims by Dallas Police that Timpa was aggressive. The officers involved were Sgt. Kevin Mansell and Officers Danny Vasquez and Dustin Dillard. Criminal charges against three officers were dropped in March 2019 and they returned to active duty. An excessive force civil lawsuit against the officers was dismissed by U. S. District Judge David C. Godbey in July 2020 on the basis of qualified immunity.

On December 15, 2021, the Fifth Circuit Court of Appeals issued a decision reversing the trial court decision giving the officers qualified immunity, which means the Timpa family won the right to go to trial in their case against Dillard.

In September 2023, a jury found three officers liable for Timpa's wrongful death, awarding Timpa's son $1 million. The officers' lawyers had argued that the cocaine content in Timpa's system was what killed him. The Timpa family's lawyers had argued for hundreds of millions of dollars to be given to the Timpa estate, Timpa's parents, and Timpa's son. Two jurors later said they regretted not giving Timpa's family more in damages.

== Reactions ==
Timpa's death came to prominence in 2020 after the murder of George Floyd, who died in a similar way. When Derek Chauvin was convicted of murdering Floyd, a number of commentators drew comparisons between Floyd and Timpa. Ryan Mills, writing in the National Review, claimed that "There was no national uproar after Timpa's death. No national cries for justice and reform." Mills also said "there was more community pressure" in the Floyd case.
