= Irish Network Against Racism =

- Type: member organisation
- Location: Dublin, Ireland
- Fields: Anti-racism, civil rights
- Key people: Shane O'Curry (director)
- Website: inar.ie

The Irish Network Against Racism (INAR) is a member organisation which campaigns against racism and other discrimination in Ireland.

== History ==
Irish Network Against Racism (INAR) was founded with the mission of "combating racism and all related forms of discrimination in every sphere of life in Ireland", formerly known as ENAR Ireland. It is the umbrella organisation of over 164 Irish civic society organisations.

== Core activities ==
INAR's work includes organising campaigns and projects, developing policies and training, and conducting research. It is a member of the European Network Against Racism. In March 2020, INAR published a report which outlined a large increase in the frequency of racist discriminatory incidents, hate incidents, hate crimes and hate speech incidents in Ireland in the preceding two years, from 140 incidents in 2018 to 530 in 2019. They called on the Irish government to develop a National Action Plan Against Racism to combat this. Alongside a number of other organisations they called for the introduction of hate crime legislation as recommended by the UN in 2019. One of their projects was the creation of a smartphone application for the reporting of incidents of racial abuse or discrimination, iReport.ie, which was launched in 2013. The goal is to collect data relating to racist incidents in Ireland to better understand the nature and frequency of these events. They have also reported on the perceptions of the victims of racial abuse, highlighting the inadequate response from the Gardaí.
