= Death of George Nkencho =

2020 police shooting near Dublin, Ireland

- Date: 30 December 2020
- Time: 12:35pm (GMT)
- Location: Hartstown, Dublin, Ireland

On 30 December 2020, the Garda Armed Support Unit shot 27-year-old George Nkencho in Clonee on the Dublin–Meath border, after graduated attempts to detain him failed. He had assaulted a shop staff member and threatened others with a knife. Nkencho had been suffering from mental health issues in the preceding months and according to Gardaí, he did not have any criminal convictions.

== Timeline ==
Prior to the standoff with armed Gardaí, Nkencho entered a Eurospar supermarket in Hartstown, where he assaulted a manager who received a broken nose which required him being taken to Connolly Hospital. It was an unprovoked attack. Nkencho then produced a kitchen knife from his pocket and threatened staff and later the Gardaí. He was followed by unarmed Gardaí, later backed up by members of the Armed Support Unit, who instructed him to drop the knife and then used tasers and pepper spray in attempts to disarm him. At 12:35pm, after multiple attempts to disarm him using a Taser weapon failed, Nkencho lunged at a member of the Armed Support Unit, who then fired six shots at Nkencho. The police were trying to prevent a hostage situation developing and did not know he was outside his family home. Nkencho received first aid at the scene from members of the Dublin Fire Brigade and paramedics and was taken to Connolly Memorial Hospital, where he was later pronounced dead.

== Aftermath ==
The circumstances and use of force regarding Nkencho's death were subsequently under investigation by the Garda Síochána Ombudsman Commission (GSOC), as is legally required when a member of the public is injured or killed by the Gardaí.

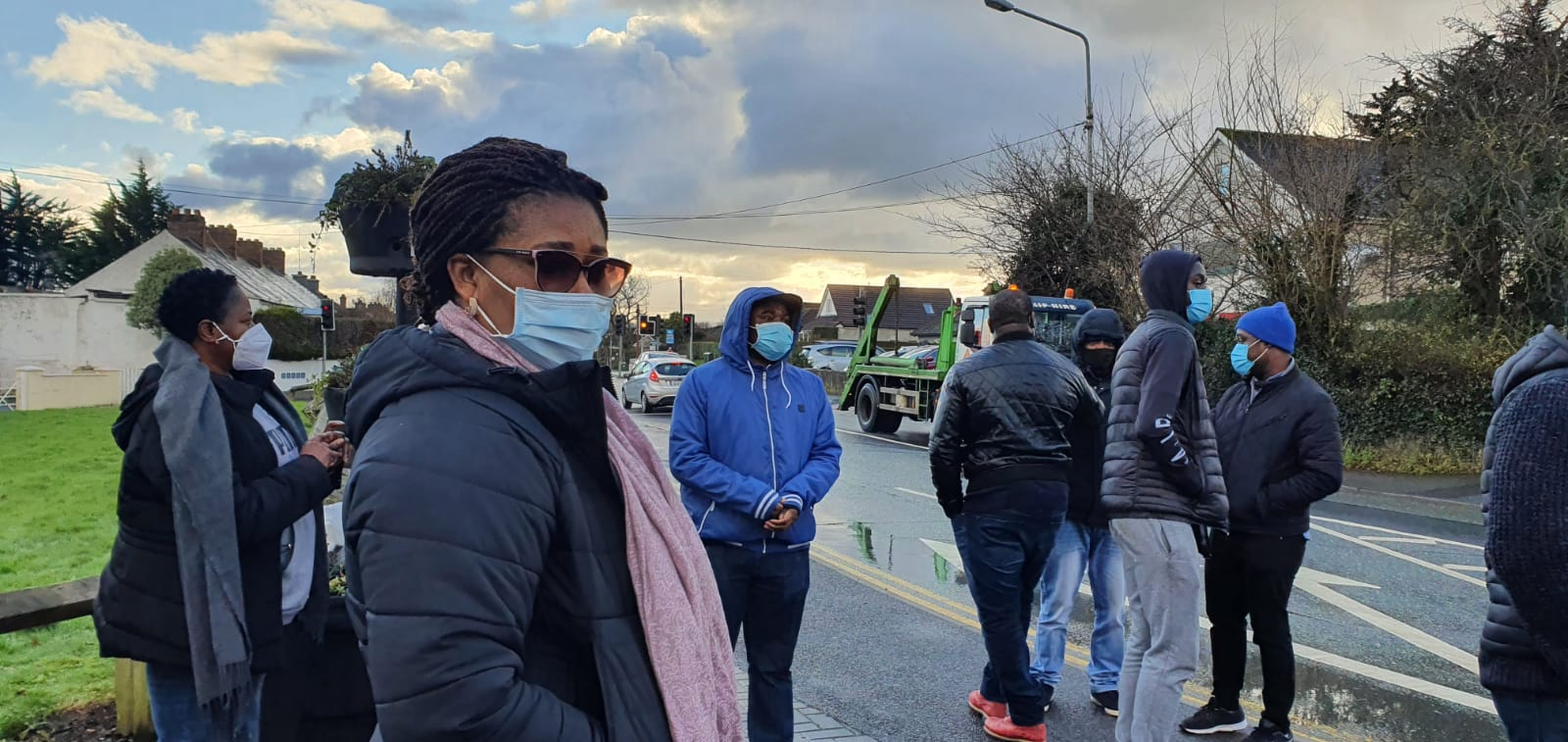
Aid People Change Nigeria Charity in Dublin protesting against the death of Nkencho in Blanchardstown.

The morning after the fatal shooting, on 31 December 2020 (New Year's Eve), around 200 people gathered outside Blanchardstown Garda Station in a protest over the death of Nkencho, calling for those involved to be punished. A break away group became violent, with objects being hurled at Gardaí and threats being made towards officers. Garda sources stressed to the media that these incidents had nothing to do with the Nkencho family or friends, and that they suspected a gang which has staged fights in Dublin city centre to be responsible for hijacking part of the demonstration. Large crowds of protestors marched through Blanchardstown shopping centre on a busy New Year's Eve, when all non-essential businesses were to close at the end of the day, following the reimposition of full COVID-19 Level 5 lockdown restrictions.

Minister for Justice Helen McEntee and Tánaiste Leo Varadkar expressed their sympathies with the family of Nkencho on Twitter. McEntee described the fatal shooting as "an extremely upsetting loss and a tragedy for his family" while the Tánaiste urged the public not to engage in "speculation". Minister for Children, Equality, Disability, Integration and Youth Roderic O'Gorman tweeted that he was "deeply saddened" upon hearing the news.

Following Nkencho's death, false allegations circulated online, claiming that Nkencho had 30 prior criminal convictions. On 3 January, the Gardaí released a statement stating its concern at what it called "lies being circulated widely online by fascists and racists" and confirming that Nkencho had no criminal convictions at all.

Protests continued throughout the week. For a fifth day in a row on 4 January, crowds of up to 50 people gathered outside Blanchardstown Garda station and Dublin's Spire in O'Connell Street to protest over the shooting of Nkencho.

Garda sources informed the media that they feared a "stabbing or hostage situation" when Nkencho was outside his family home, and could not have known at that time whose home he was outside or his relationship to the occupants. It was reported that Nkencho's sister had opened the door to him, told Gardaí that he had mental health issues, before she was ushered back inside by Gardaí. The deceased's three siblings were in the hallway when the shots were fired.

Six months later, on 21 June 2021, an inquest into the death of Nkencho was opened in the Dublin coroner's court, before being adjourned for six months until December 2021, as the GSOC investigation remained ongoing. A group of demonstrators gathered outside the RDS in support of the family members who attended the inquest opening. By December 2021, it was reported that a further adjournment was sought at the coroner's court, as the GSOC investigation was "not yet complete".

On 19 June 2023, the Garda Siochana Ombudsman Commission (GSOC) announced that the investigation into the fatal shooting of George Nkencho had concluded, and that a file had been sent to the Director of Public Prosecutions (DPP). It was further reported in the Irish Independent on 27 August 2023, that the DPP had made contact with the GSOC seeking clarification on aspects of its probe into the fatal shooting of George Nkencho.

On 24 April 2024, GSOC announced that the DPP had directed that there be no prosecution of Gardaí in relation to the death.

== See also ==
- Death of John Carthy
- Shooting of Colm Horkan
