= Brown Thomas =

Department store chain in Ireland

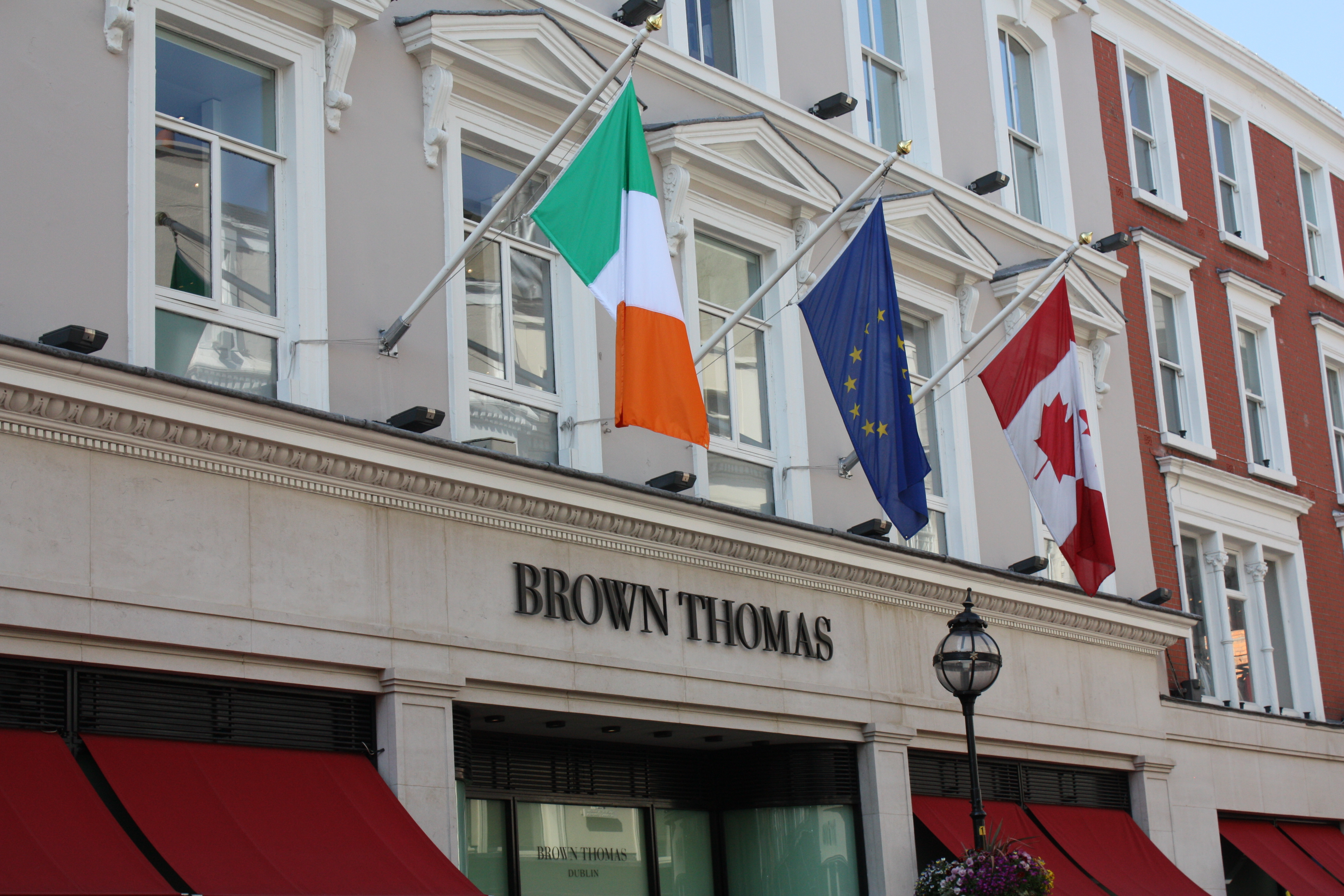
- Type: Private
- Industry: Retail
- Genre: Department stores
- Founded: 1848; 178 years ago
- Founders: Hugh Brown and James Thomas
- Headquarters: 88-95 Grafton Street; Dublin, Ireland
- Area served: Ireland
- Products: Quality and luxury goods
- Revenue: ▲€200 million (2016)
- Net income: ▲€85 million (2016)
- Owner: Selfridges Group
- Number of employees: ▲6,000 (2016)
- Parent: Brown Thomas Arnotts Limited
- Subsidiaries: BT2
- Website: brownthomas.com

Brown Thomas & Company Limited is a chain of five upmarket department stores in Ireland, with two located in Dublin, and one each in Cork, Galway, and Limerick. Together with Dublin's Arnotts department store, it is owned by the Selfridges Group, which in turn is owned by Thai Conglomerate Central Group and Saudi Arabia's Public Investment Fund (PIF).

== History ==
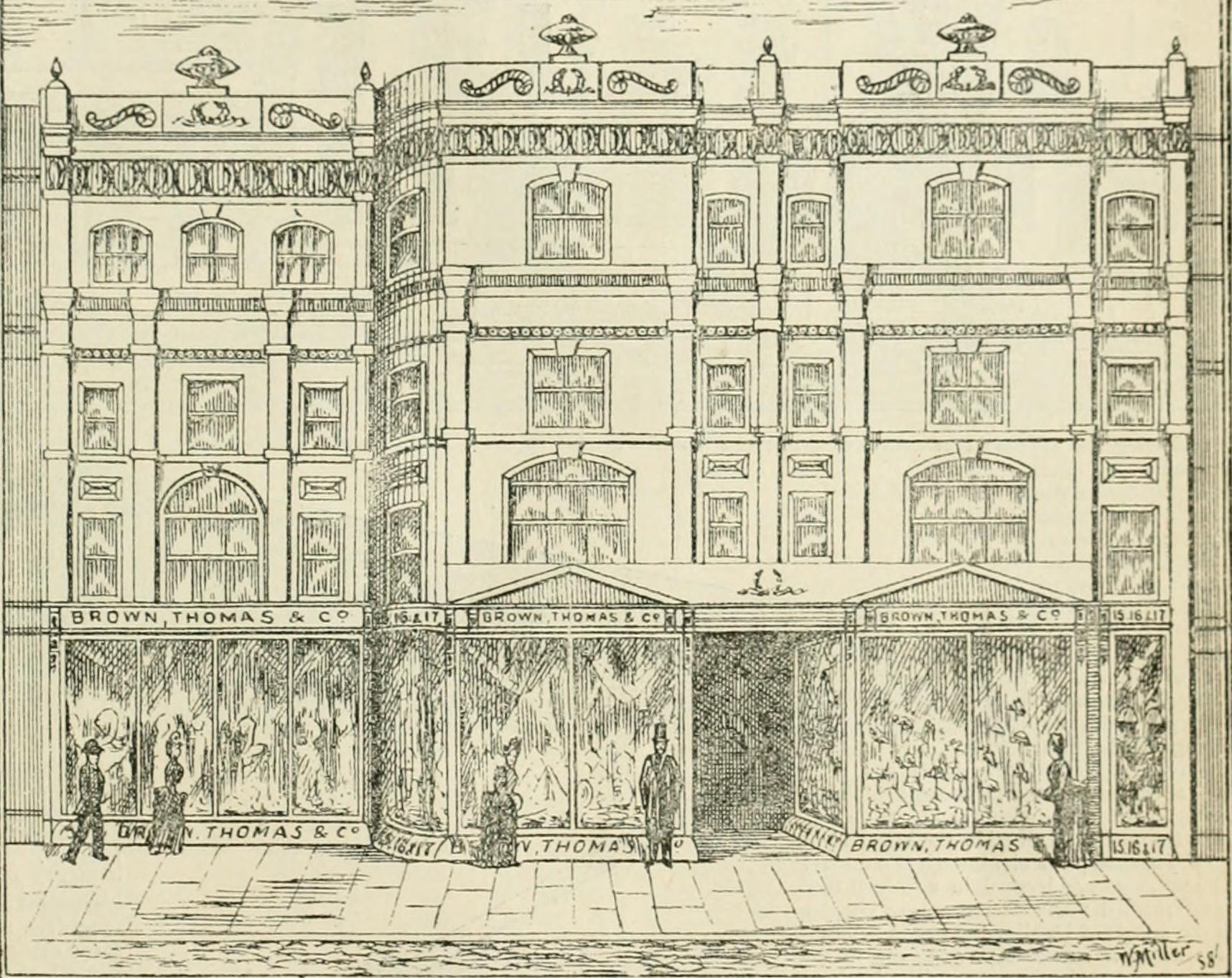
Brown Thomas in 1887

The Dublin store was opened by Hugh Brown at 16 Grafton Street in 1848. The following year, with James Thomas, he expanded into No.17. By the mid-1850s, they had also bought number 15 and enlarged the shop further. The company was purchased by Harry Gordon Selfridge in 1919 and operated as a branch of Selfridge Provincial Stores until 1933, when it was sold to John McGuire, who had made his name in Clerys.

In the 1960s, the company went public on the Irish Stock Exchange. By December 1970, it had its main shop in Dublin, together with shops in Cork and Tralee, and five A Wear boutiques. In March 1971, it accepted an offer from Penneys to purchase its Cork and tralee shops.

In 1971, Galen Weston bought a share in the company and in 1983 bought the balance of the shares, and Brown Thomas became private again.

In 1989, the company attempted to buy the Switzer Group, which included Switzers in Dublin, along with Cashs of Cork, Moons of Galway and Todds of Limerick from House of Fraser. However, they were outbid by the Ewart Group from Belfast. Ewart subsequently failed, as the deal could not be financed, allowing Brown Thomas to make a second bid in November 1990, which was accepted. The acquisition was subsequently completed on 16 April 1991.

In 1994, Brown Thomas sold its original store to Marks & Spencer for £20m and took over the lease of the then M&S store at 28/29 Grafton Street, which then became BT2. This transaction was completed on 11 February 1995.

The two Dublin stores merged in Switzer's location on 14 February 1995 but under the name Brown Thomas. Cashs, Moon's and Todd's continued until 1998, however between 1998 and 2000 were all rebranded Brown Thomas. BT2 meanwhile opened in 1998.

The company also owned the A Wear retail chain until June 2007. The Brown Thomas Group sold A Wear for €70m to a management buyout (MBO) team, which was backed by UK private equity firm Alchemy Partners. It is understood that Brown Thomas had expected to get €85m for the A Wear business, but later settled for the lower sum.

In December 2021, the Weston family sold Brown Thomas and Arnotts to a Thai-Austrian consortium, Central Group, for €4.7 billion.

In February 2022, a store opened in the Dundrum Town Centre, taking over part of the former House of Fraser location there. In November 2023, Signa Holding, part owner of Selfridges, and in turn Brown Thomas, filed for insolvency.

In October 2024, Saudi Arabia's Public Investment Fund (PIF) acquired Signa Holding's 40% stake in the Selfridges Group. As a result, Central Group now holds 60%, while PIF owns 40%, making them joint owners of Brown Thomas today.

== Dublin store ==
The 12,000 m^{2} Dublin store on Grafton Street is the chain's flagship location. It includes boutiques for Hermès, Louis Vuitton, Celine, Gucci, Arami, Balenciaga, Prada, Armani, Jo Malone, Charlotte Tilbury, Bobbi Brown, Chanel, Burberry, Saint Laurent, Ralph Lauren, Coach, Michael Kors, Ted Baker. The store is split over 4 levels, with Menswear on the lower ground floor, the Beauty Hall and Accessories Hall on the Ground Floor, the Designer Rooms and Shoe Rooms on Level 1, Womenswear and Lingerie on Level 2 and the Living Department and the Children's Rooms on Level 3.

== Other store information ==
The stores appeal to a wide audience, selling both prêt-à-porter and haute couture clothing and accessories. The downstairs menswear section of the Dublin branch has been recently renovated. Ralph Lauren, Gant, Hugo Boss, Paul Smith, Dolce & Gabbana and Prada are some of the brands that can be found in the new men's basement area. Both the restaurant and cafe are now located together on the top floor of the store.

Previously connected to the Dublin branch was Aya Sushi Bar, on Clarendon Street. This closed in January 2009. In May 2009, a branch of Yo! Sushi opened at the same location.

== BT2 ==
Brown Thomas also operates the BT2 chain, which it launched in 1995, located in Blanchardstown Shopping Centre. The Dundrum Town Centre outlet closed in February 2022. There was previously a store on Grafton Street however this branch closed on 29 August 2016 with the premises now occupied by Victoria's Secret. These stores have more mass-market clothes aimed at the 18-35 market, such as Victoria Beckham, Acne Studios, Helmut Lang and COS. BT2 also sells a wide range of cosmetics.

Paris Hilton chose BT2 as the launch site of her perfume Heiress by Paris Hilton.

== Stores ==
- Dublin - 12,000 m^{2}
- Dundrum - 5,700 m^{2}
- Cork - 5,300 m^{2}
- Limerick - 4,000 m^{2}
- Galway - 1,600 m^{2}

For the year ending 30 January 2021, Brown Thomas had a gross profit of almost €74 million.
