= Sybil Connolly =

Irish fashion designer (1921–1998)

- Connolly, c. 1954
- Born: 24 January 1921; Swansea, Wales
- Died: 6 May 1998 (aged 77); Dublin, Ireland
- Occupation: Fashion designer

Sybil Connolly (24 January 1921 – 6 May 1998) was a celebrated fashion designer and global icon known for her innovative use of traditional Irish textiles in haute couture. Often described as "Dublin's Dior", she achieved international repute and success, making her one of the first Irish designers to do so. She was a member of the "Big Three" Irish fashion designers (along with Irene Gilbert and Raymond Kenna/Kay Peterson), and was described by former Taoiseach (prime minister) Jack Lynch as "a national treasure."

She worked with brands such as Tiffany & Co. and Bloomingdale's. Among her fashion label's famous clients were American First Lady and style icon Jacqueline Kennedy, Elizabeth Taylor, the Rockefellers, and the Mellons. Her activities were covered in both the fashion press and the social columns of publications such as the Hollywood Reporter. Described by Bettina Ballard, the influential editor of American Vogue, as a "personable milk-skinned Irish charmer," she came to the notice of Carmel Snow, the Dalkey-born editor of Harpers Bazaar. Snow was instrumental in introducing Sybil Connolly to the American market and press.

== Early life and career ==
Sybil Veronica Connolly was born on Clanllienwen Road, in Morriston, Swansea, Wales. Sybil was the eldest of two daughters of Evelyn Connolly (née Reynolds) from Wales and John Connolly, an insurance salesman from Waterford, Ireland. Her education came largely from her Welsh grandfather and private tutors. Her father died while she was a teenager, and the family moved to Waterford, where she spent two years at the local Our Lady of Mercy School, on Military Road. At seventeen her interest in clothes led her to be apprenticed to Bradley & Co., a prestigious London dressmaking company run by two Irish brothers, Jim and Comerford Bradley. Their clients included Queen Mary. Connolly would attend Buckingham Palace fittings where she was allowed to hold the pins. She returned to Ireland in 1940, where she worked for the Dublin store Richard Alan. She remained unknown to the general public, for the next thirteen years, until she replaced the French-Canadian head designer Gaston Mallet in 1953. She was invited by Jack Clarke to produce the next season's range. Here her work was spotted by American buyers. She was known already for her textiles, including the crystal pleated linen that was said to take nine yards of material for each yard of finished cloth. It is said that she received her initial training at The Grafton Academy.

== Establishment of label ==
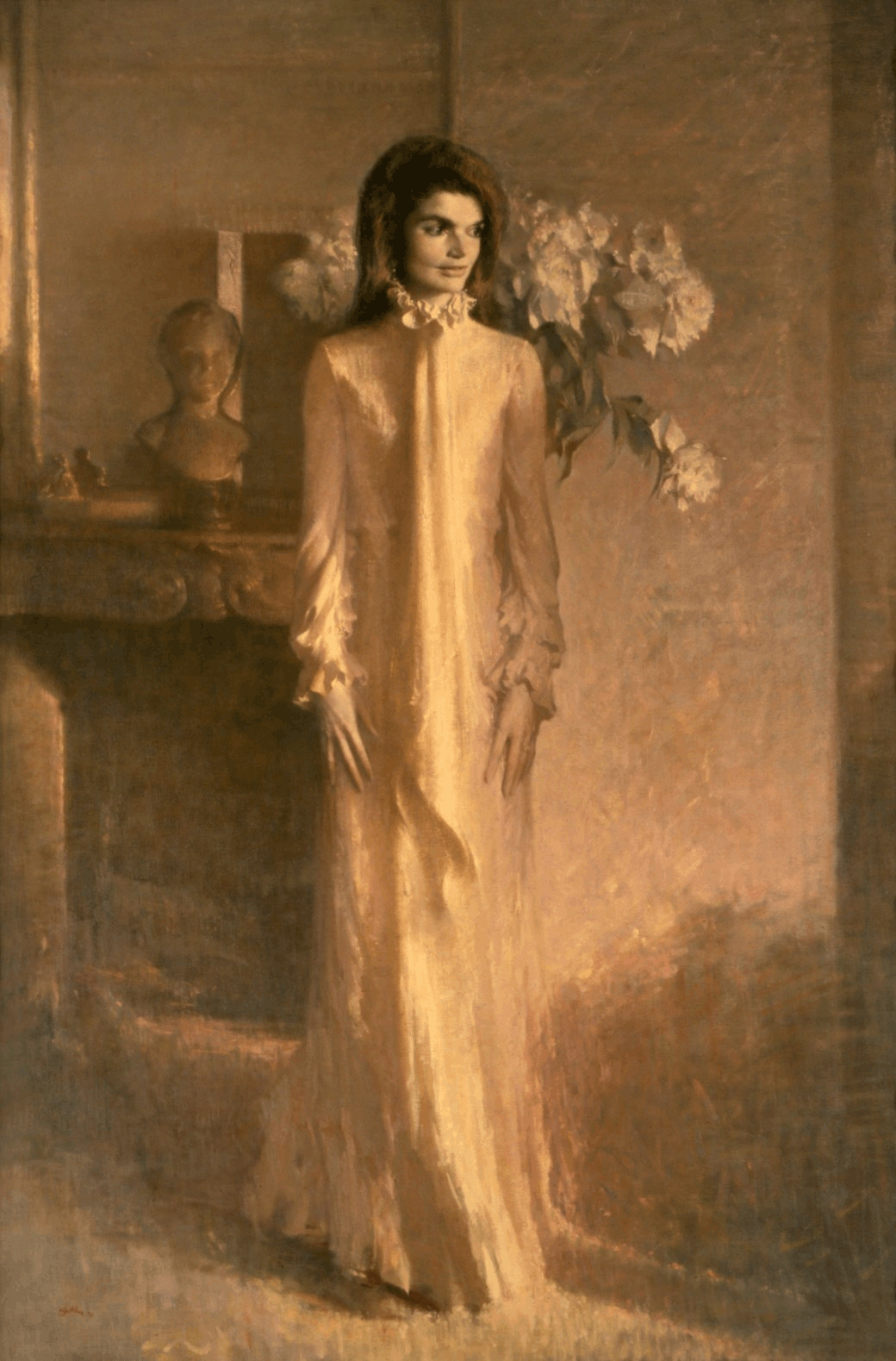
Jacqueline Kennedy's official portrait wearing a Connolly outfit

Connolly's first major fashion show was held at Dunsany Castle in 1953. Photographer Richard Dormer used the house and its grounds for a shoot of Connolly's clothes and one picture – showing model Anne Gunning in a full-length red Kinsale cape and white crochet evening dress – made the cover of Life magazine in August 1953 under the heading 'Irish invade fashion world'." The show was a huge success – thanks in part to Harpers Bazaar editor Carmel Snow. It was attended by American press and buyers and Connolly’s career took off rapidly after that, especially in the United States.

Connolly capitalised on this publicity by travelling with her collection to the US later the same year, where she made another life-long friend, Eleanor Lambert, doyenne of American fashion publicists. Avedon's photographs of Connolly and her fashions also ran in Harpers Bazaar of October 1953. Connolly officially launched her couture label in 1957; she was 36.

Part of Connolly's success may be attributed to her flair for publicity. She was also a glamorous advert for her brand – a 1954 feature in Housewife magazine gushed: "this fairytale person has looks. Short curling dark hair. Eyes the brown of peat...And a model figure too". She was made part of the International Best Dressed List Hall of Fame in 1965.

As her profile continued to rise in the United States, so did her client list – with Julie Andrews and Elizabeth Taylor wearing her clothes. Notably, Jacqueline Kennedy wore a Sybil Connolly pleated linen dress when she sat for an official Aaron Shikler White House portrait in 1970. Many of her designs were sold, via private shows, to prominent social names such as Mellon, Rockefeller and Dupont family members. By the time she was profiled in the Saturday Evening Post in November 1957, three-quarters of Sybil Connolly's gross earnings (then estimated at $500,000 per annum) originate in sales to the United States. She broadened her export market via a friendship with the newspaper magnate Frank Packer, with two heavily publicised visits to Australia in October 1954 and August 1957.

In the late 1950s, she was employing around 100 women, half of them working from their own homes where they wove tweed or handmade lace.

Among her assignments was to redesign habits for three orders of nuns – the Sisters of Mercy in the United States and two Irish orders.

=== Brand hallmarks ===
Connolly was adept at reworking traditional Irish fabrics and styles – including peasant blouses, flannel petticoats and shawls, finely pleated linen, wools such as Báinín, Limerick and Carrickmacross lace, – to give them contemporary appeal and glamour. She took the red flannel traditionally used for petticoats in Connemara and turned it into huge billowing peasant skirts. Vawn Corrigan cites her importance in the re-imagination of Donegal tweed. Closer to her family origins in Waterford, she used tweed from the Ardfinnan Woollen Mills for the first green uniforms of Aer Lingus. She made one skirt out of men's linen handkerchiefs, and in 1954 a summer dress out of striped linen tea towels, called the "Kitchen Fugue", leading her to be praised by Bazaar as someone with an "intuitively facile hand". Perhaps her most distinctive contribution to fashion was pleated handkerchief linen – as worn by Jackie Kennedy in the official White House portrait – it took up to nine yards of Irish linen handkerchiefs to create one yard of the uncrushable pleated fabric that she pioneered. Designs were created in Ireland, and Connolly employed up to 100 women, mostly crocheting and weaving in their own homes. Although there was intricate craft in her designs, prices were lower than the typical European couture label. Connolly worked directly with the cloth, without preliminary sketches.

==== The First Love dress ====
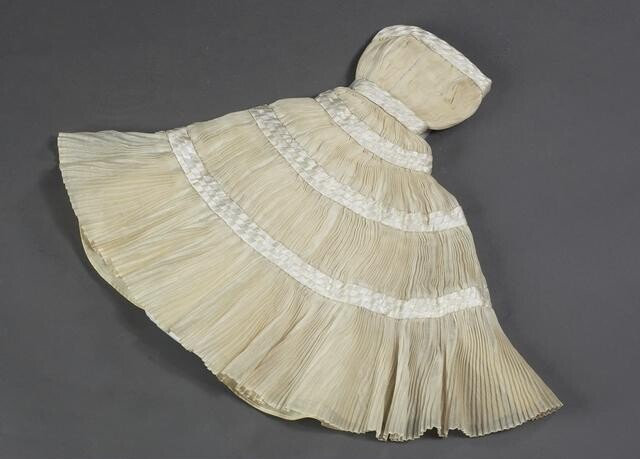
Maquette for cream evening dress 'First Love' by Sybil Connolly

Sybil Connolly's signature design was the dress made from pleated handkerchief linen. The first pleated handkerchief linen garment to be shown in the United States was a white evening dress called First Love. It required three hundred handkerchiefs and contained more than five thousand pleats. Time magazine described it as "the dress that brought the house down" in the grand ballroom of the Waldorf Astoria, where it showed in March 1953 alongside Europe's top designers of the time, including Dior, Balenciaga and Visconti. The First Love dress was made in the Clarke's Richard and Alan shop in 58 Grafton Street, Dublin, where Sybil Connolly worked for more than 10 years. In 1953 Connolly had only very recently begun designing dresses for the business.

In July 1954, Richard Clarke married Dorothy, and she wore the First Love Dress for the occasion. After the wedding, Dorothy had it shortened and wore it to dress dances. Almost 60 years later, when her granddaughter Anna Clarke got engaged, she asked her grandfather if she could wear it on her own big day. The dress was repaired and restored by freelance textile conservator Rachel Phelan in 2013, and Anna Clarke actually got to wear it.

== Later career ==
Her home, Number 71 Merrion Square – which she described as "the house that linen built" – became a showcase for her taste and private clients would be served jasmine tea by a butler called James. Located in one of the most fashionable areas of Dublin, it was what she called a "shop window for Ireland".

In the 1980s, Connolly began designing for luxury goods makers Tiffany & Co., Tipperary Crystal, Brunschwig & Fils and Schumacher. Sybil also revived interest in the designs of Mary Delany (1700-1788), basing a series of Tiffany & Co. tableware on her floral embroidery. In her later career, Connolly began designing interior fabrics and wallpapers.

In the 1980s, she became involved with the restoration of The Swiss Cottage, Cahir, County Tipperary. The Cottage was originally built in the early 1800s by Richard Butler, 1st Earl of Glengall, based on a design by Regency architect John Nash. The cottage is rustic in style with a distinguished thatched roof. The interior theme was based on nature. Such was Connolly's interest in the restoration she helped to raise funds for the project. The Swiss Cottage opened to the public in 1989.

== Recognition and legacy ==
In 1991, Connolly received an honorary doctoral degree (LLD) from the National University of Ireland.

In 2012, Connolly's work attracted renewed interest when actor Gillian Anderson wore a vintage dress by the designer for the BAFTAs. The Hunt Museum, Limerick City houses examples of her work. In 2018, the museum released images of Sybil's designs into the Public Domain.

== Writing ==
In the 1980s, Connolly turned to writing. She wrote 3 books:

In an Irish Garden (1986)

In an Irish House (1988)

Irish Hands - the tradition of beautiful crafts (1994)

== Gallery ==
=== Dresses ===
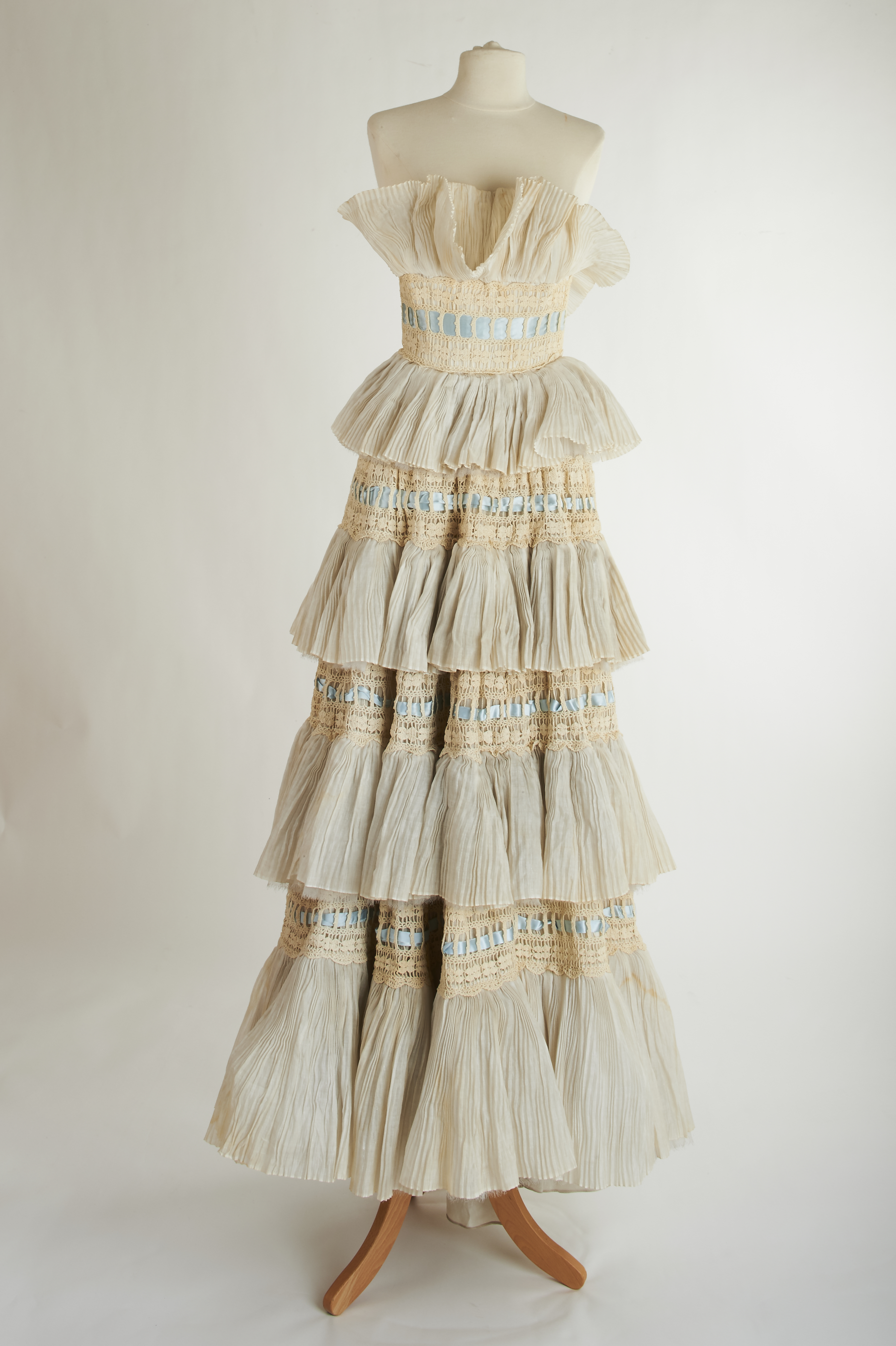
Heiress gown from 1957 with chevron pleated handkerchief linen.

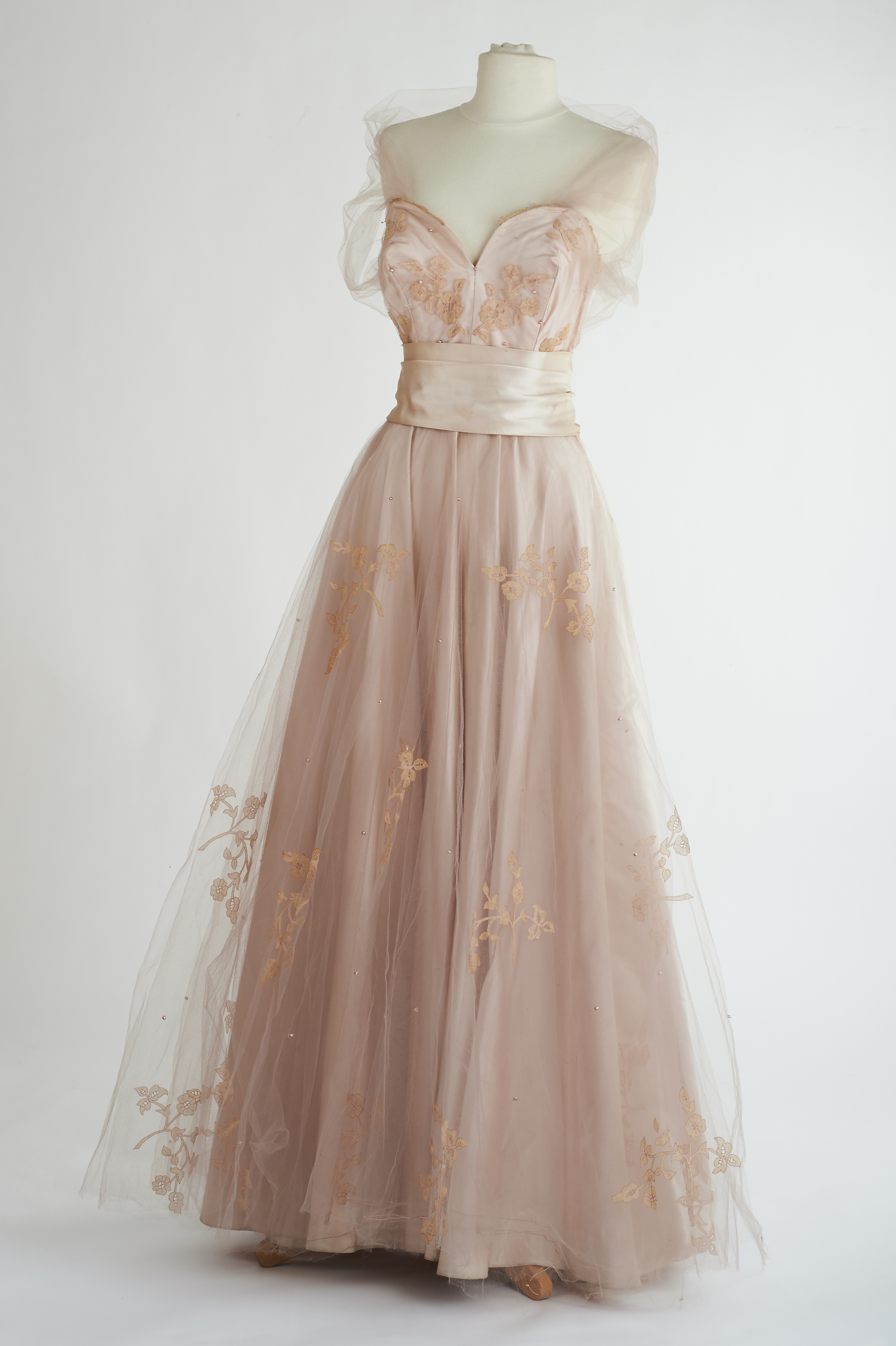
Pink Ice gown with Carrickmacross appliqué lace.

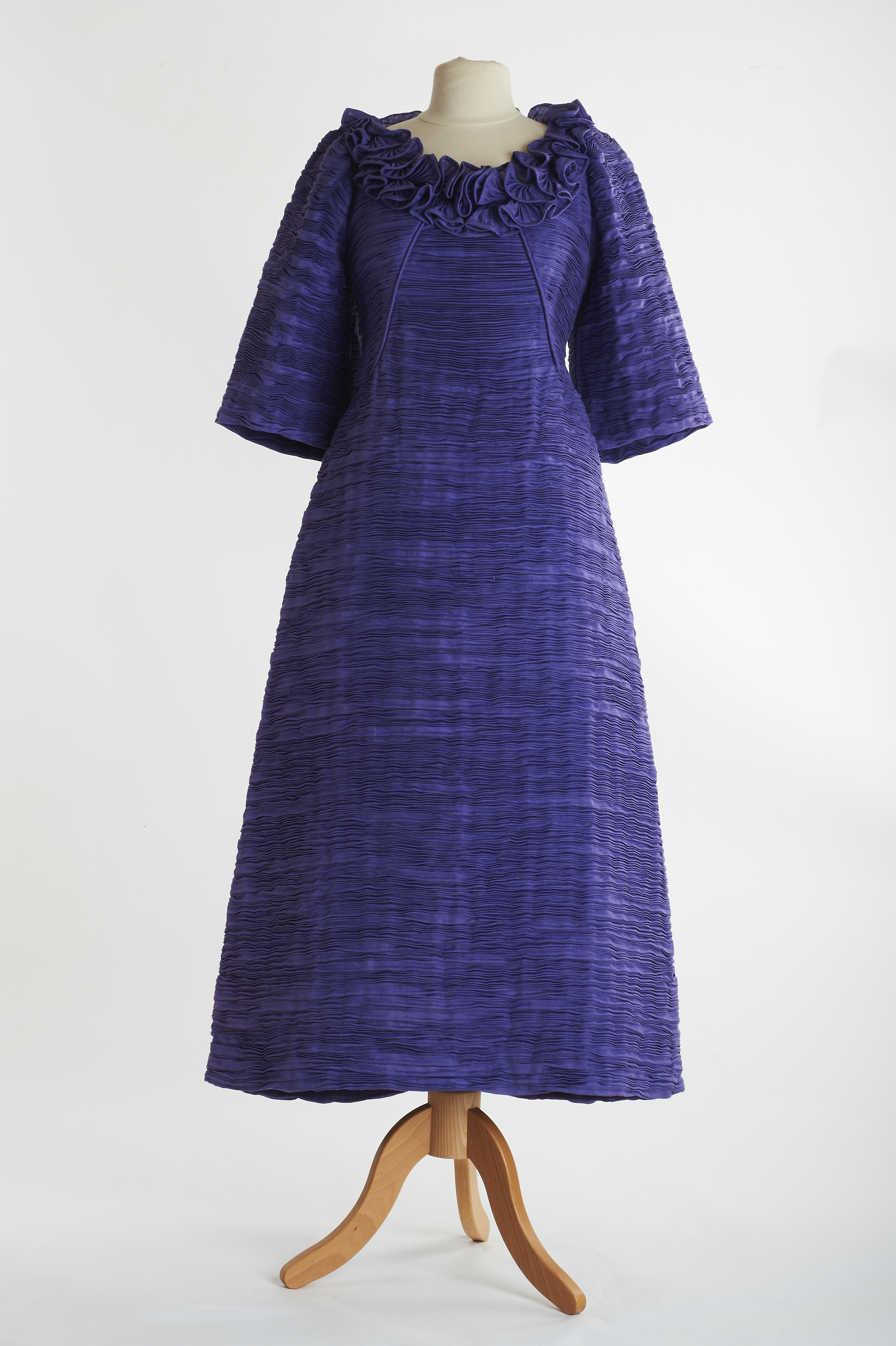
Lavender evening gown with gossamer pleated linen.

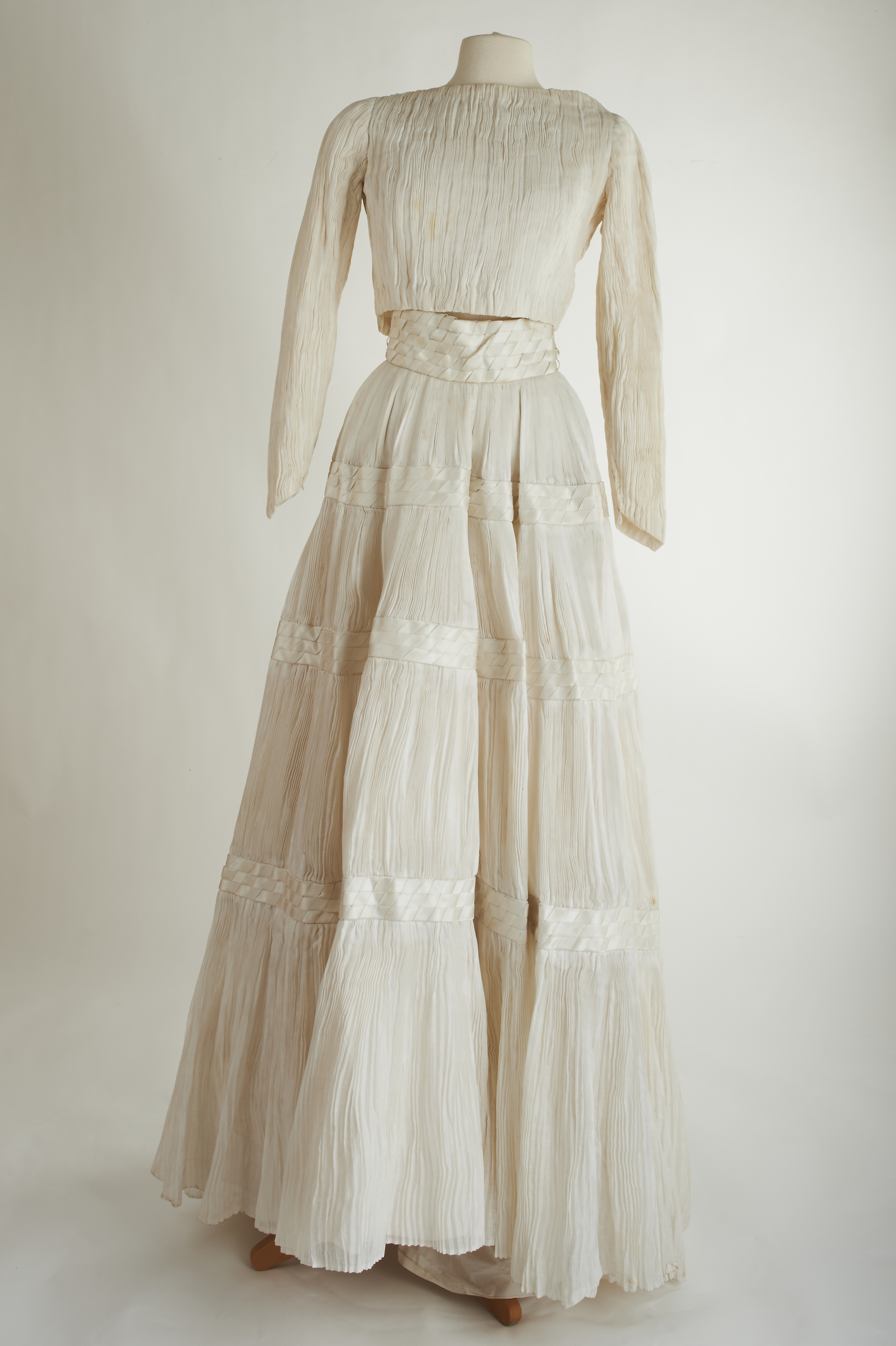
Wedding two-piece outfit in pleated linen. The skirt is based on the design of the ‘First Love’ dress.

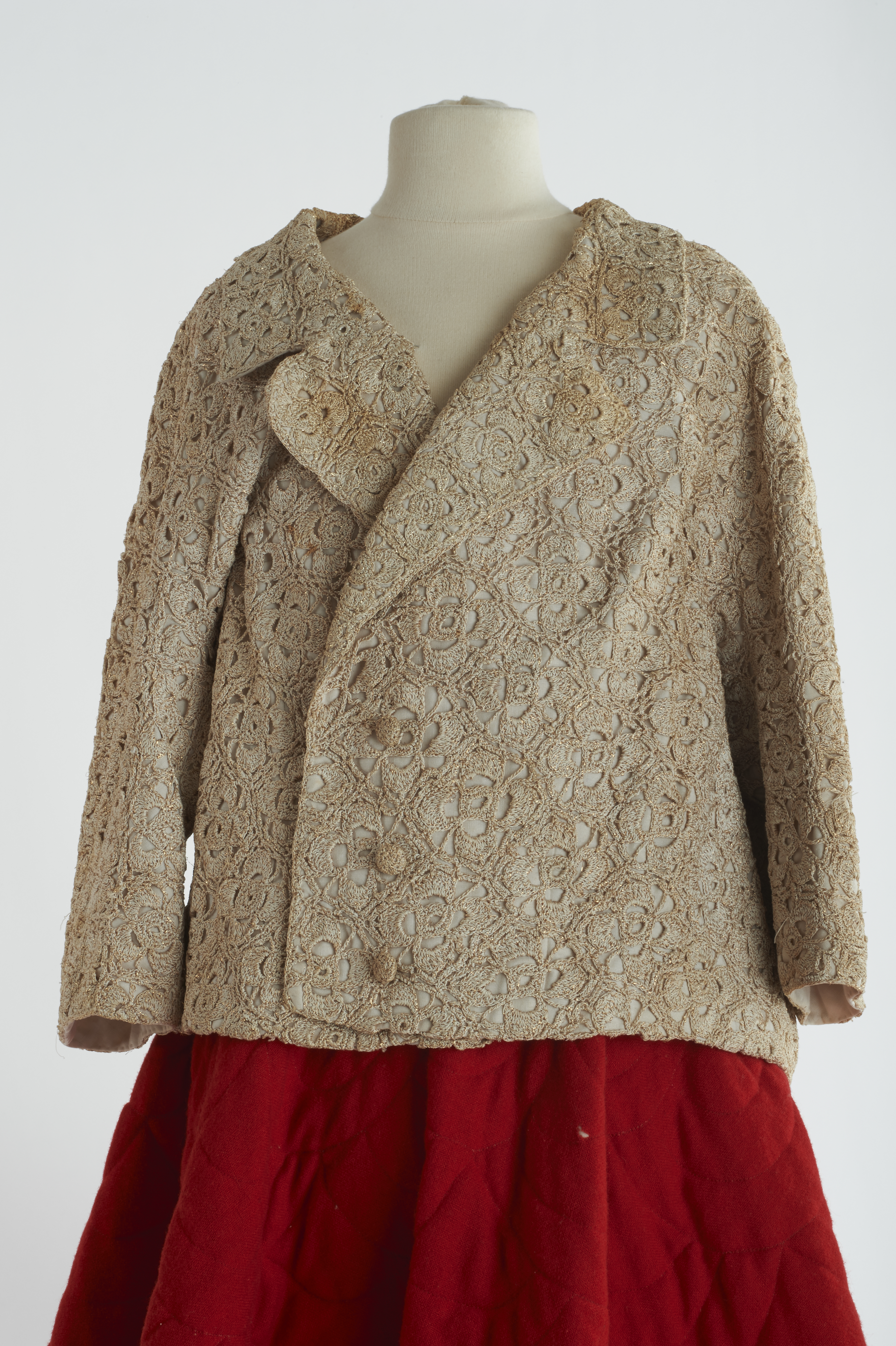
Gold Lace Jacket

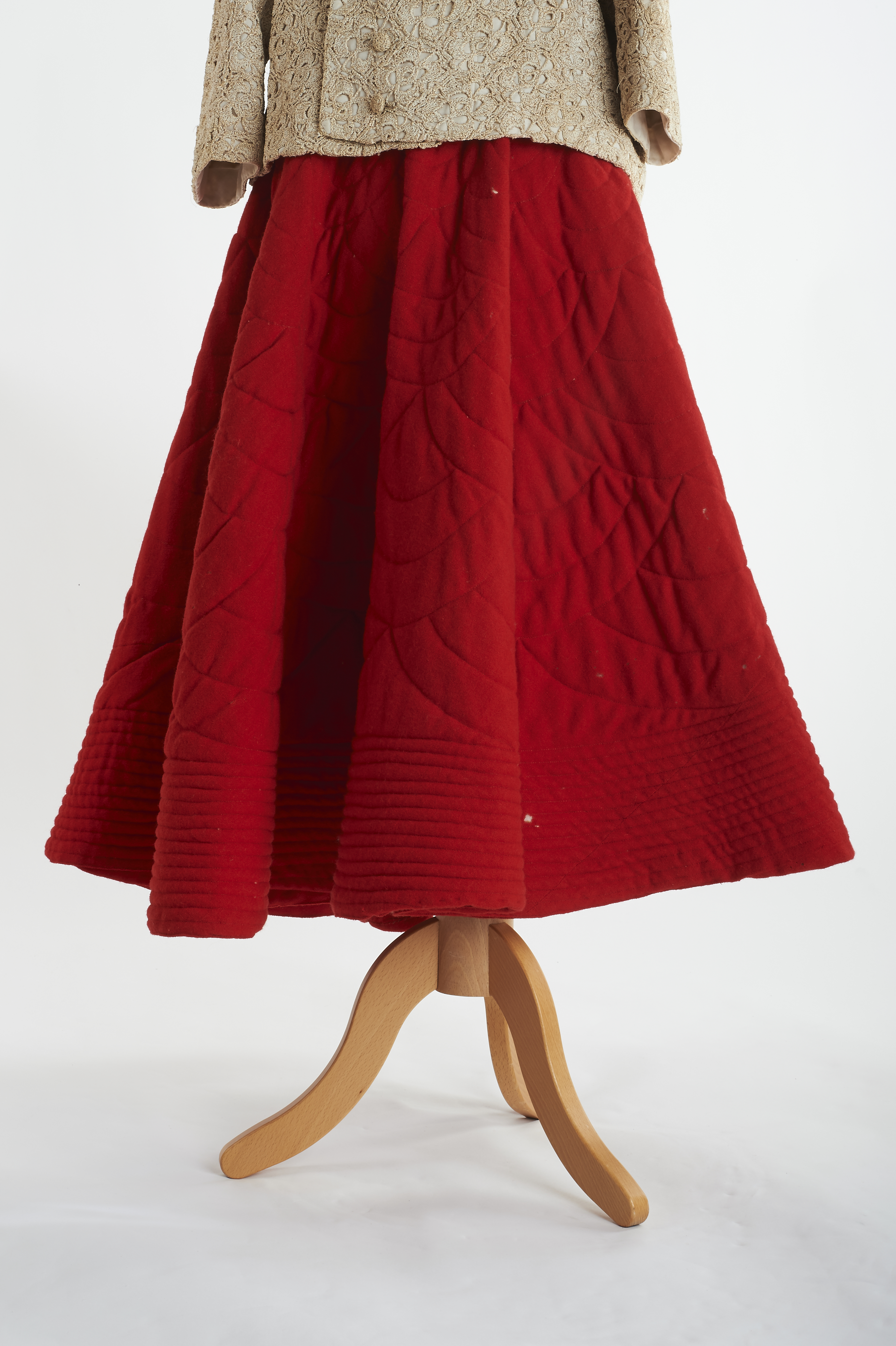
Red Flannel Wool, Quilted skirt

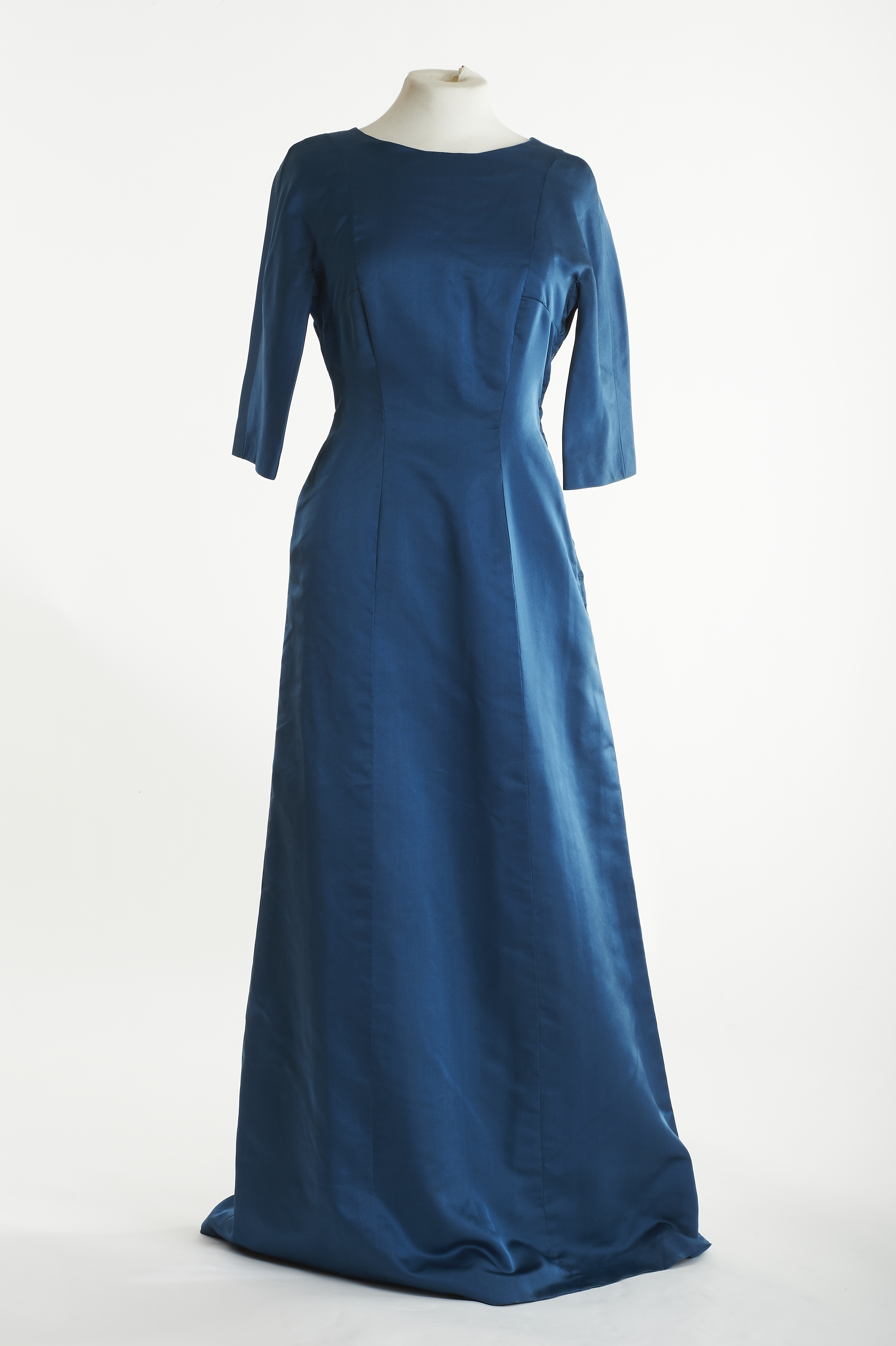
Full-length petrol blue silk evening gown

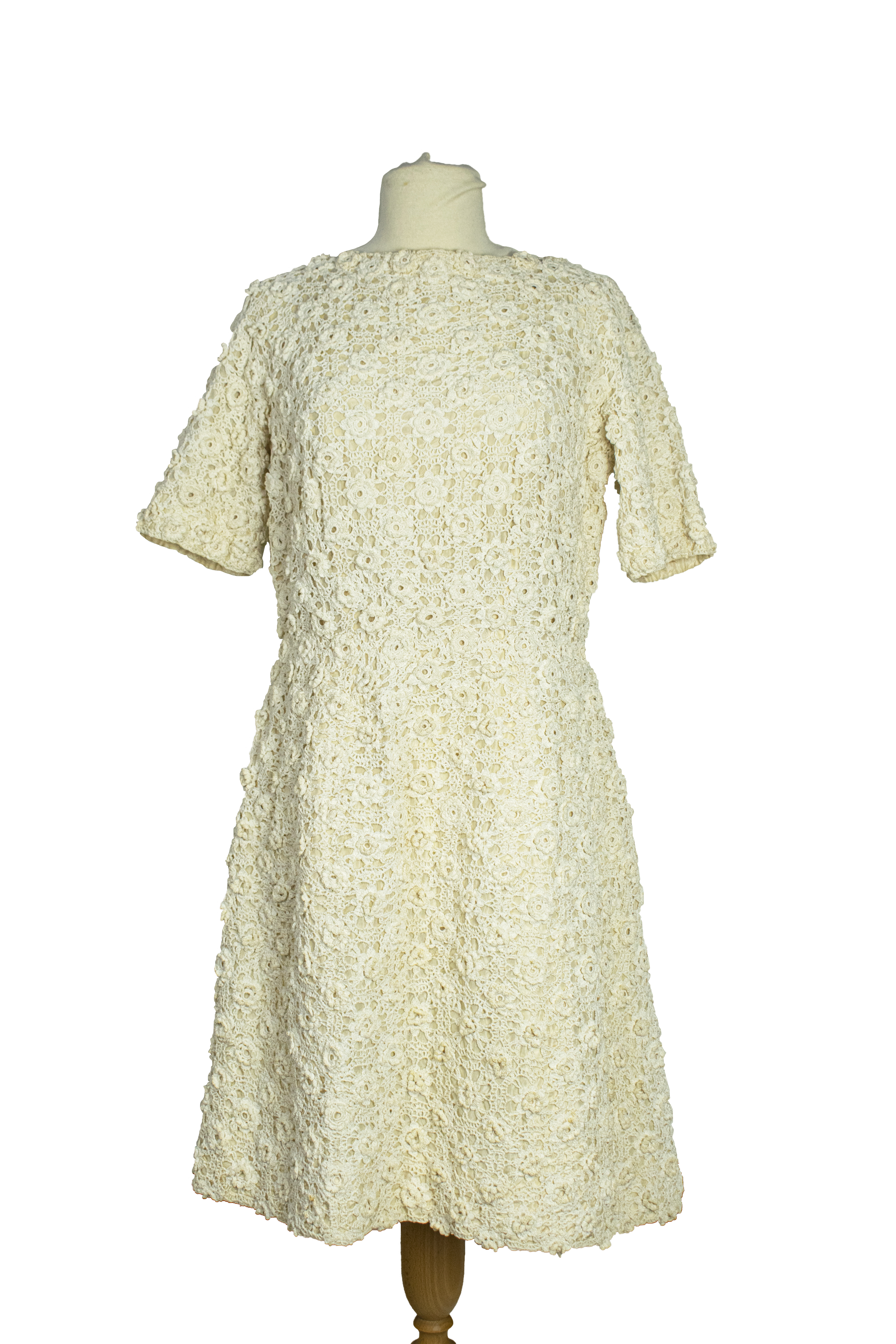
White Crochet dress designed by Sybil Connolly, Full Length Front

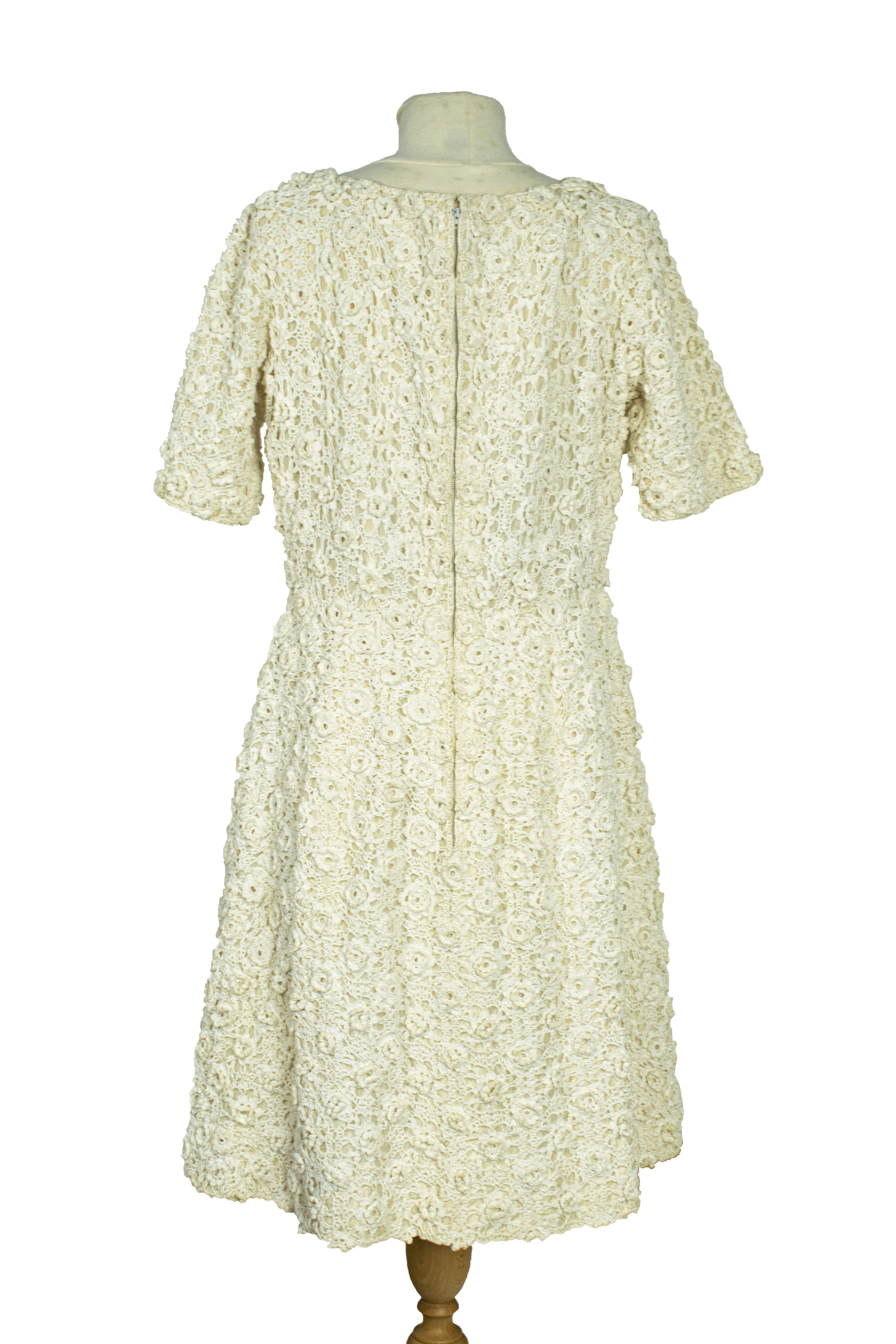
White Crochet dress designed by Sybil Connolly, Full Length Back

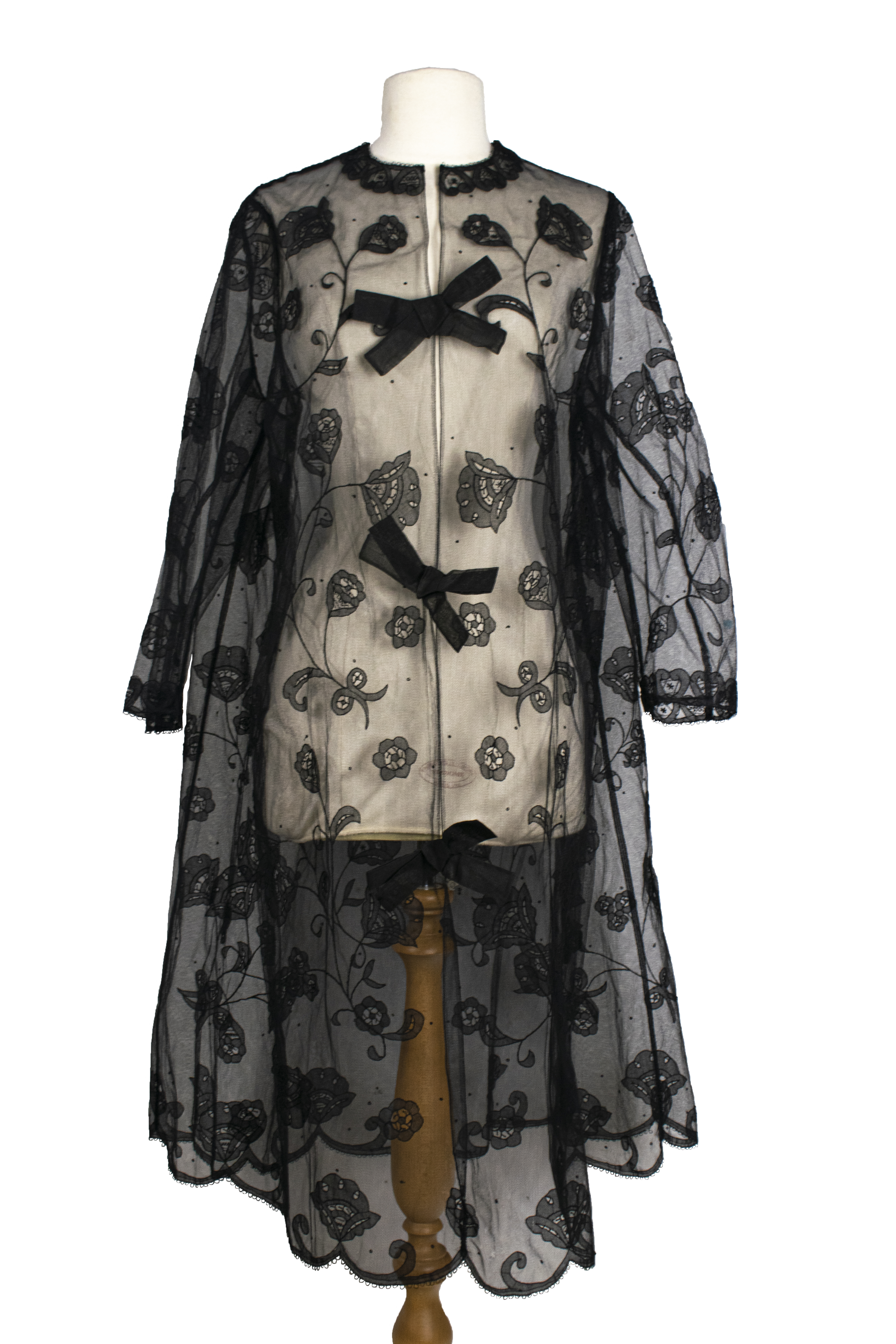
Black Lace kaftan “Illusion”-Front-

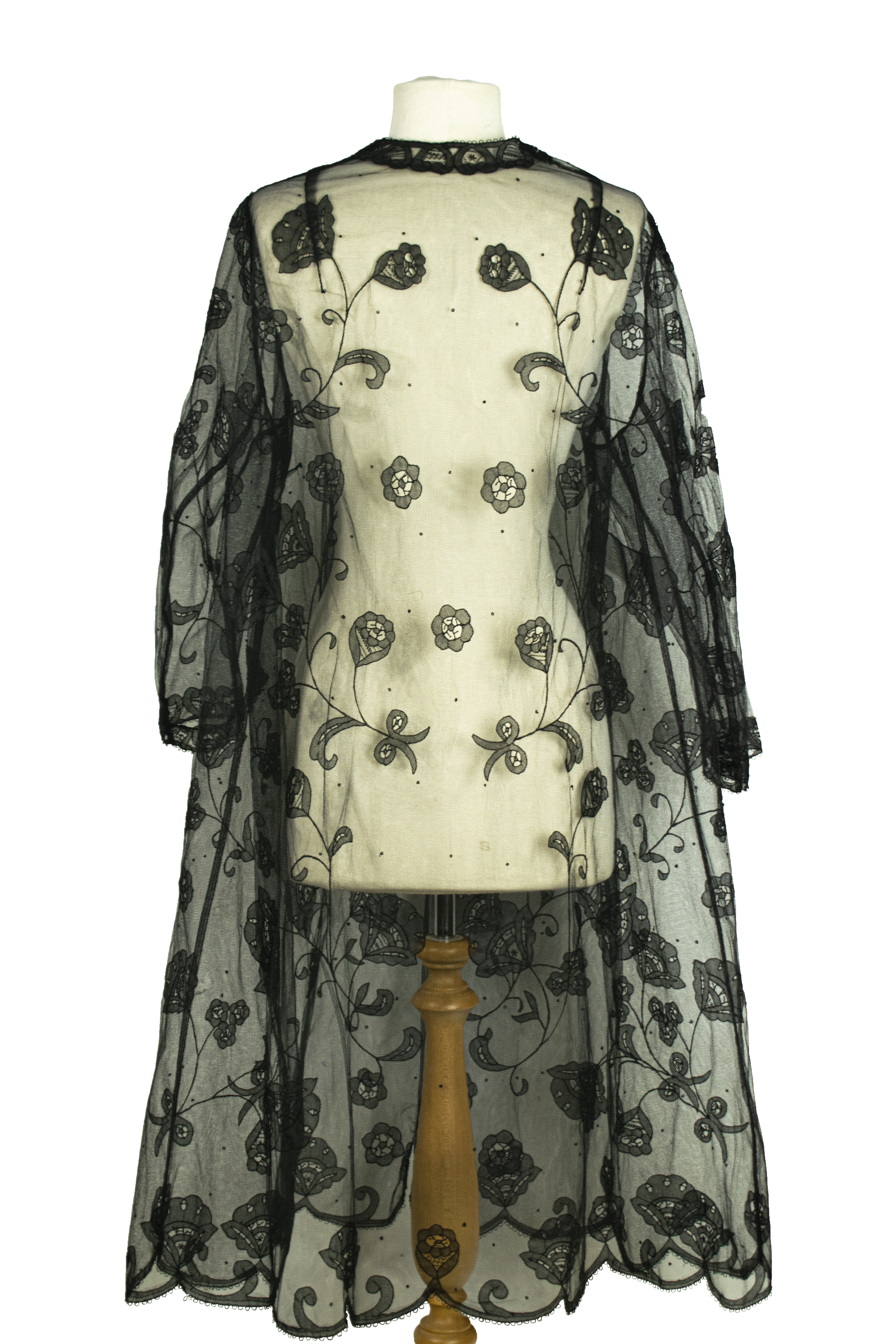
Black Lace kaftan “Illusion”-Back-

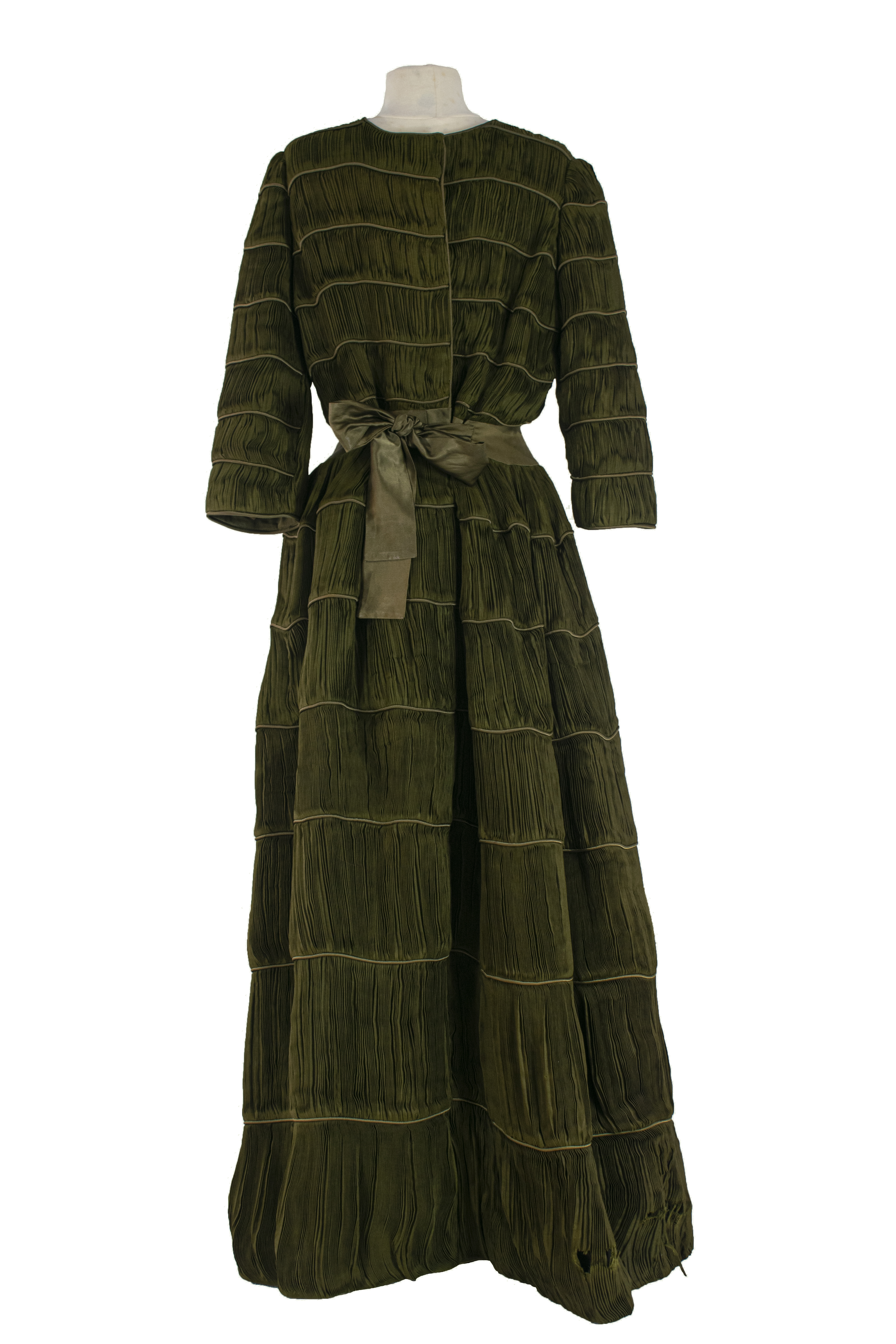
Green Pleated Linen Dress- Front-

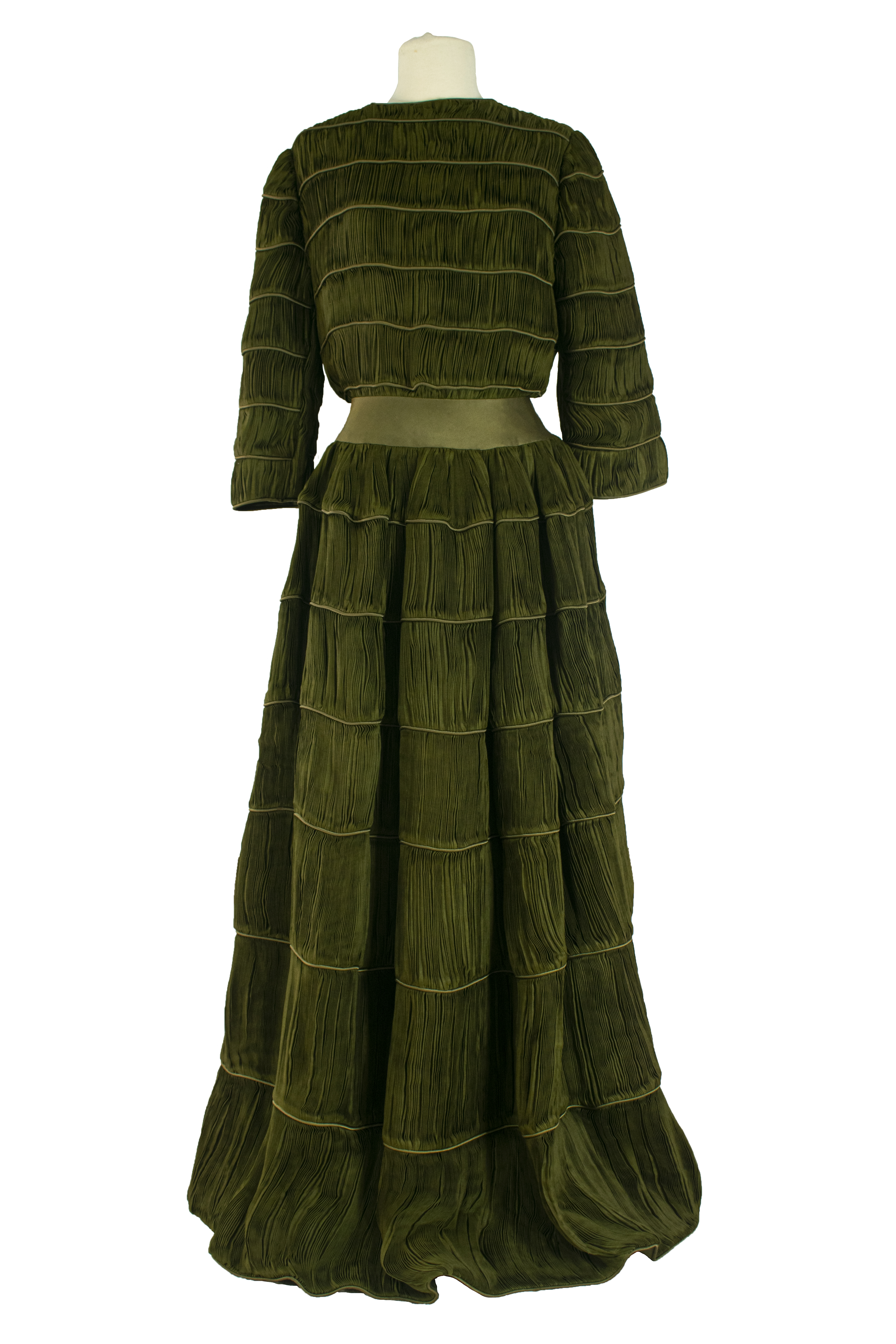
Green Pleated Linen Dress- Back-

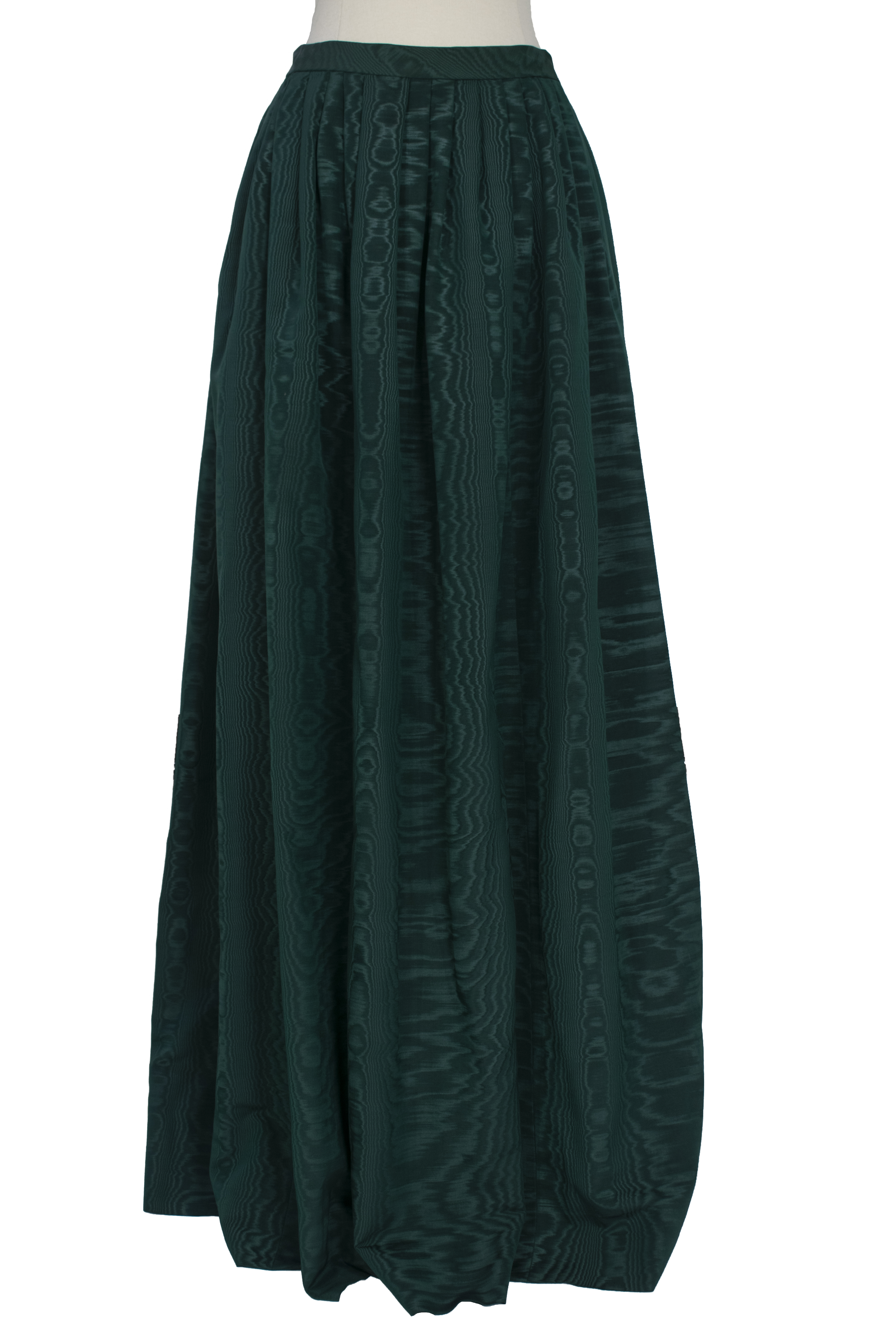
Green Poplin Skirt by Sybil Connolly- Front-

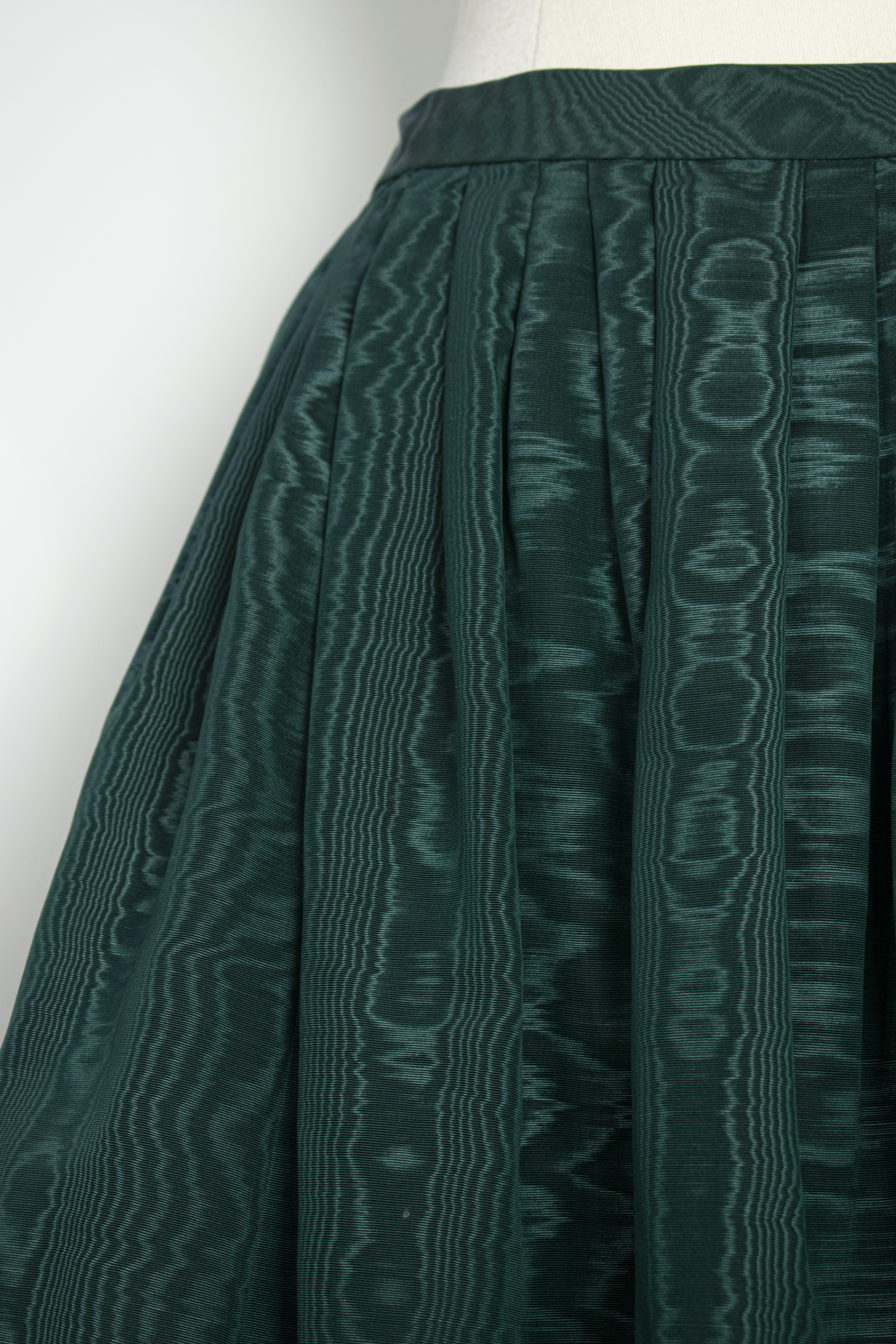
Green Poplin Skirt by Sybil Connolly- Details-

=== Sketches ===

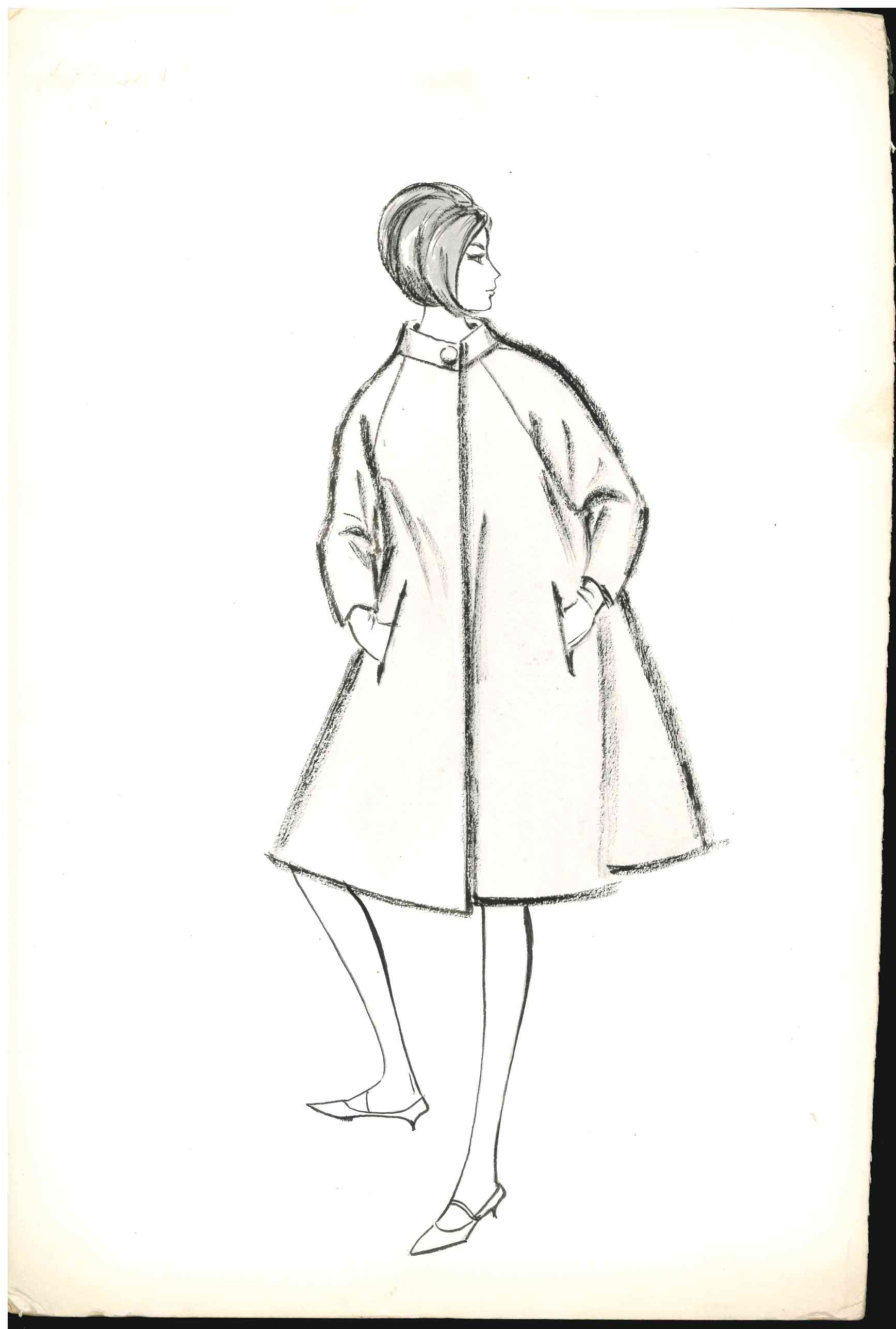

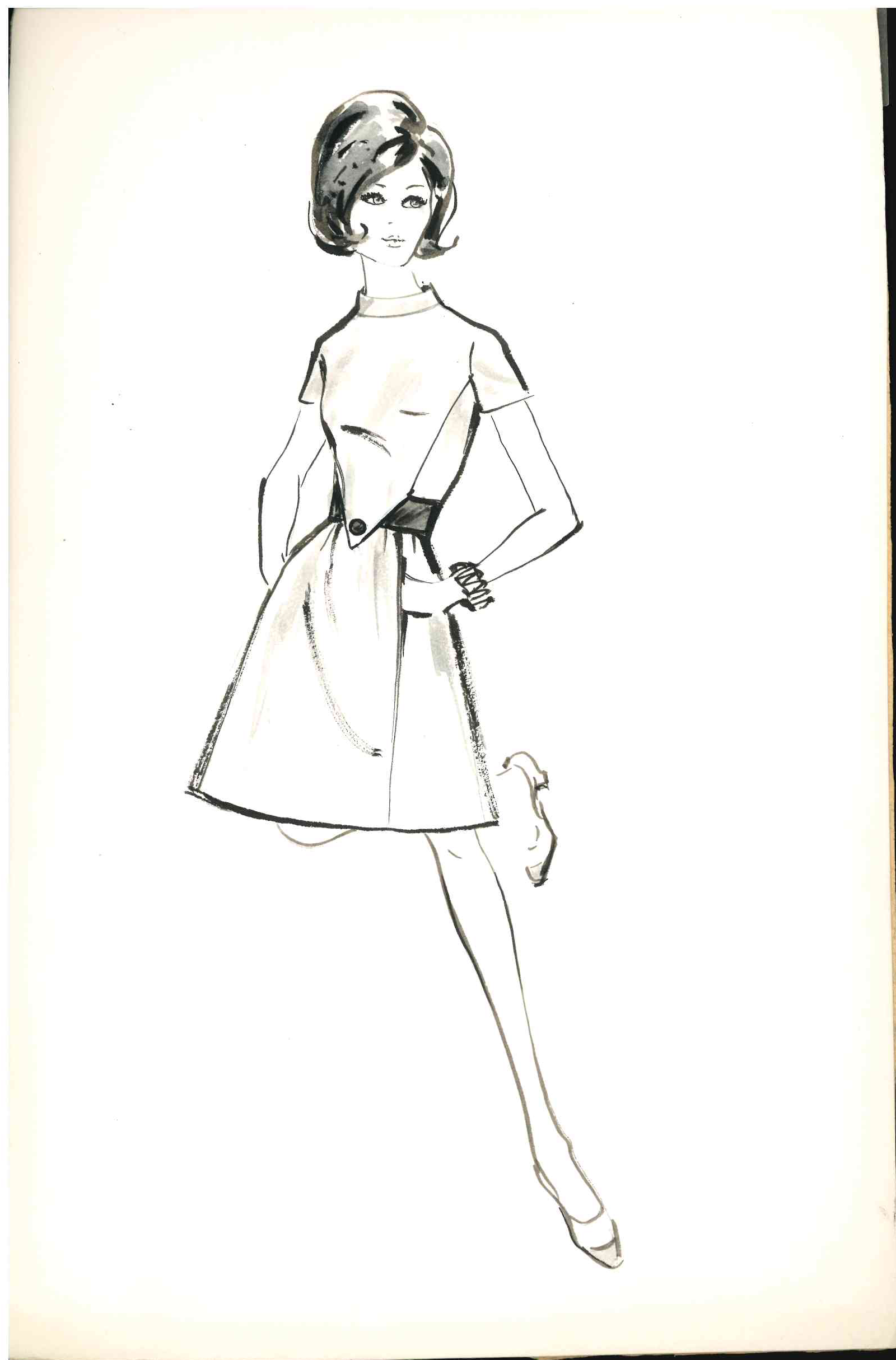

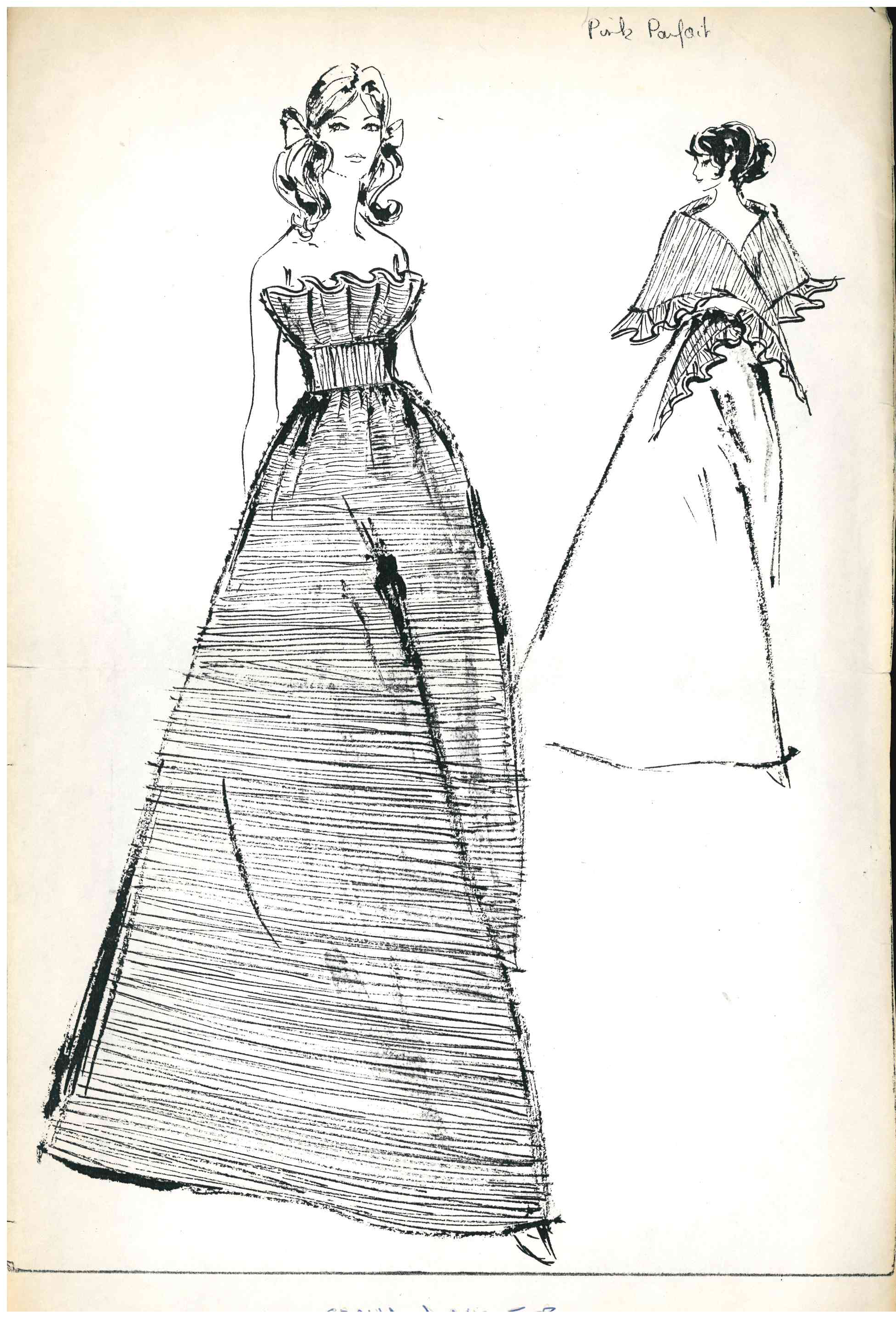

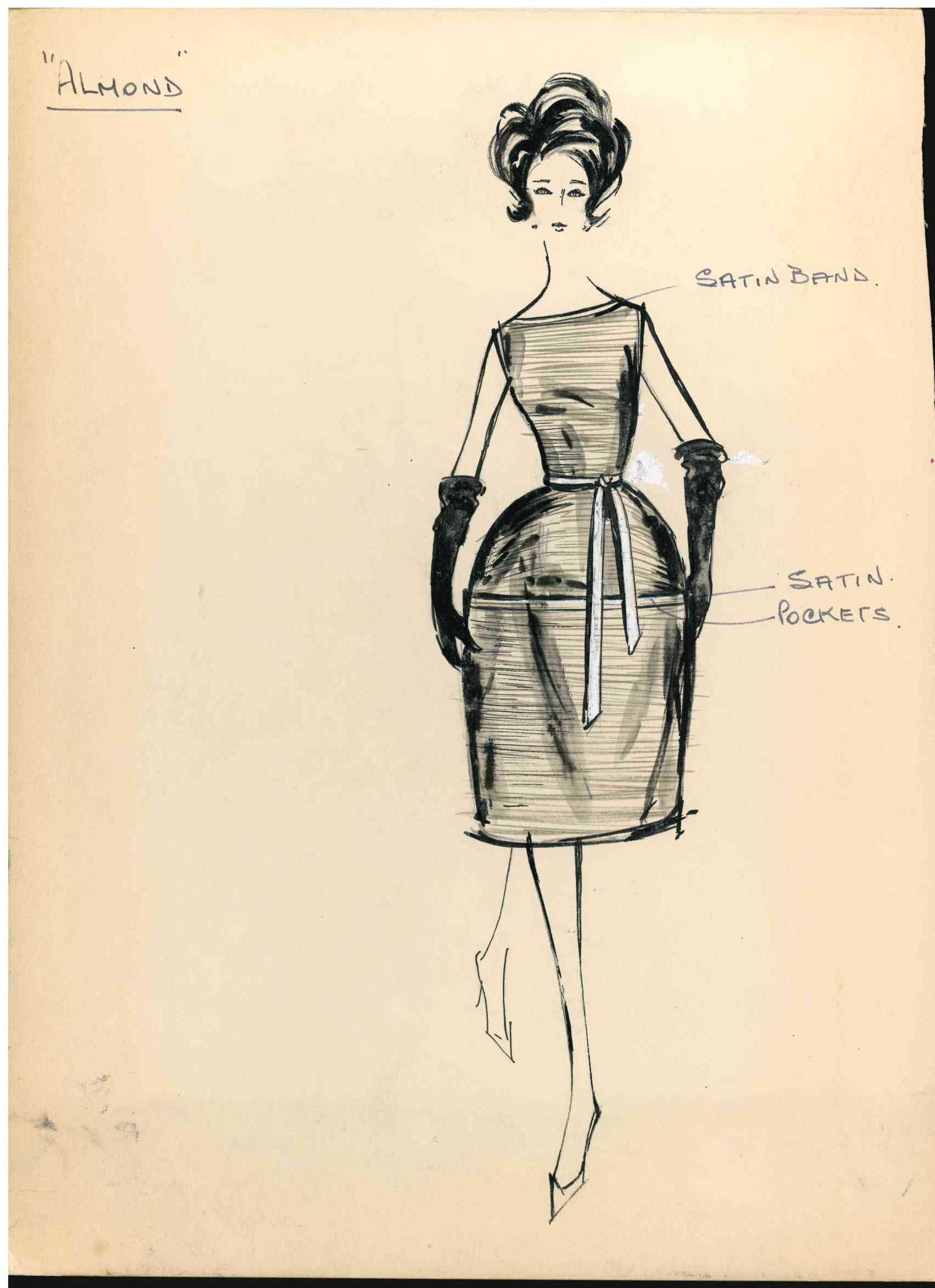

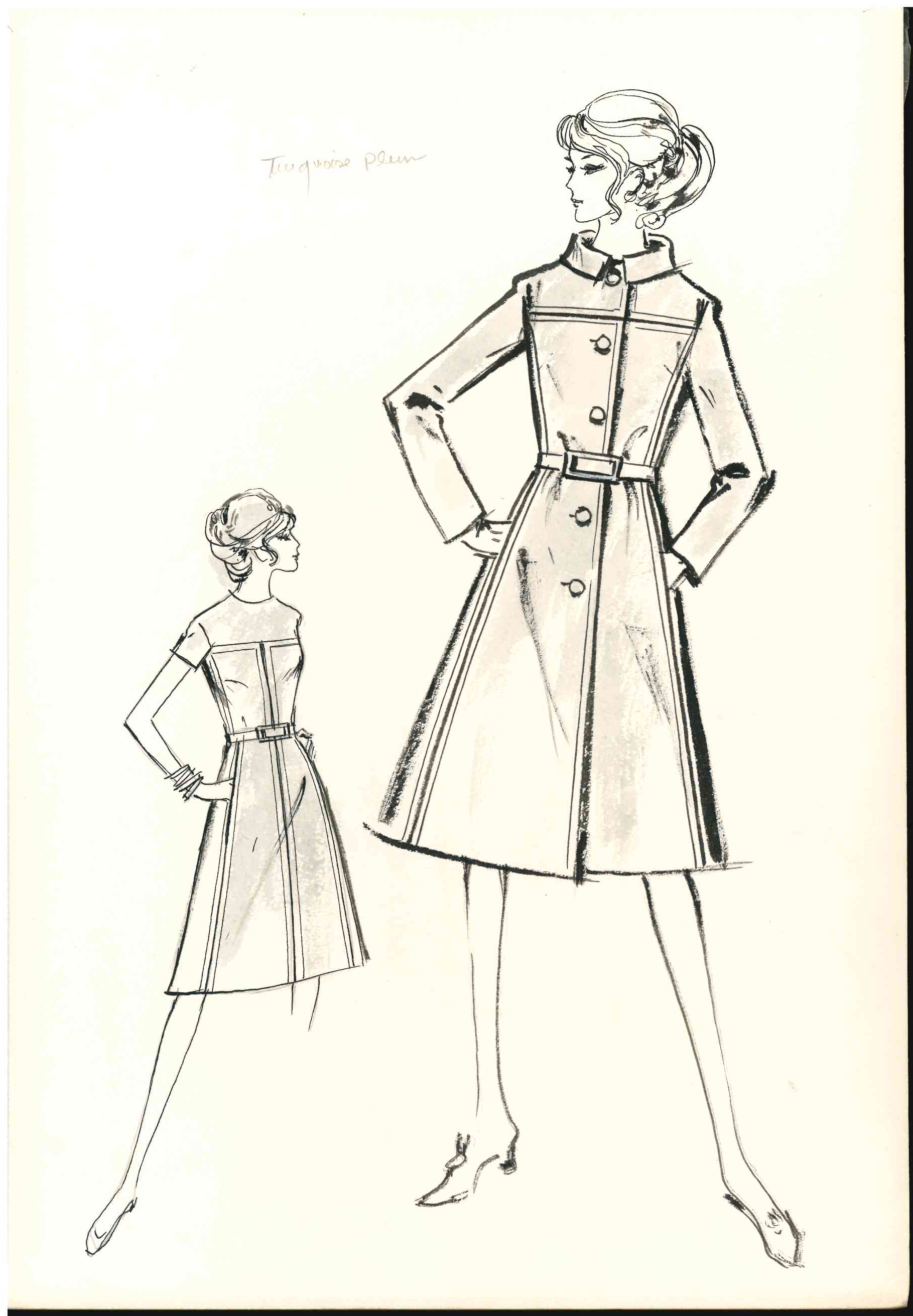

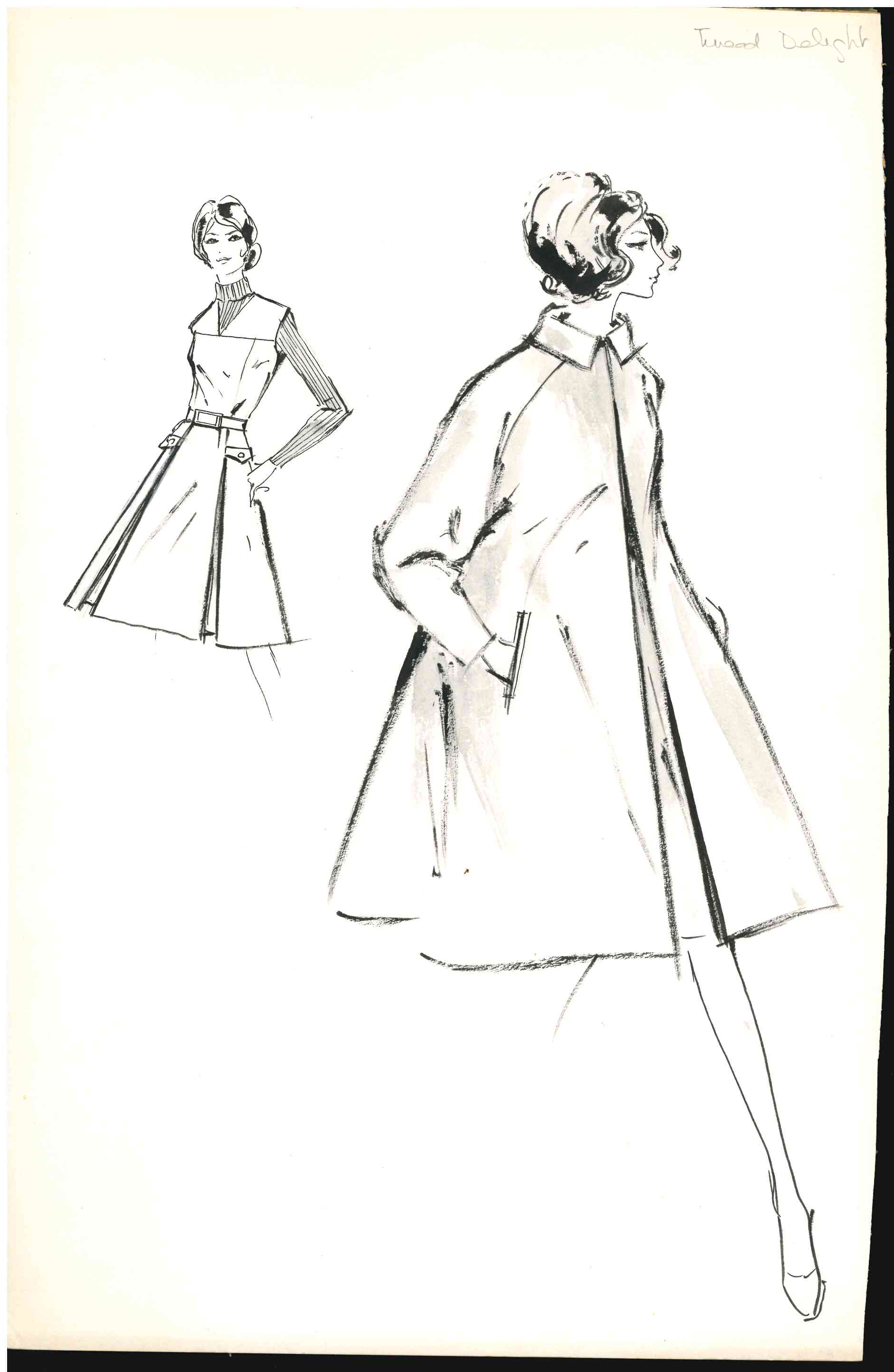

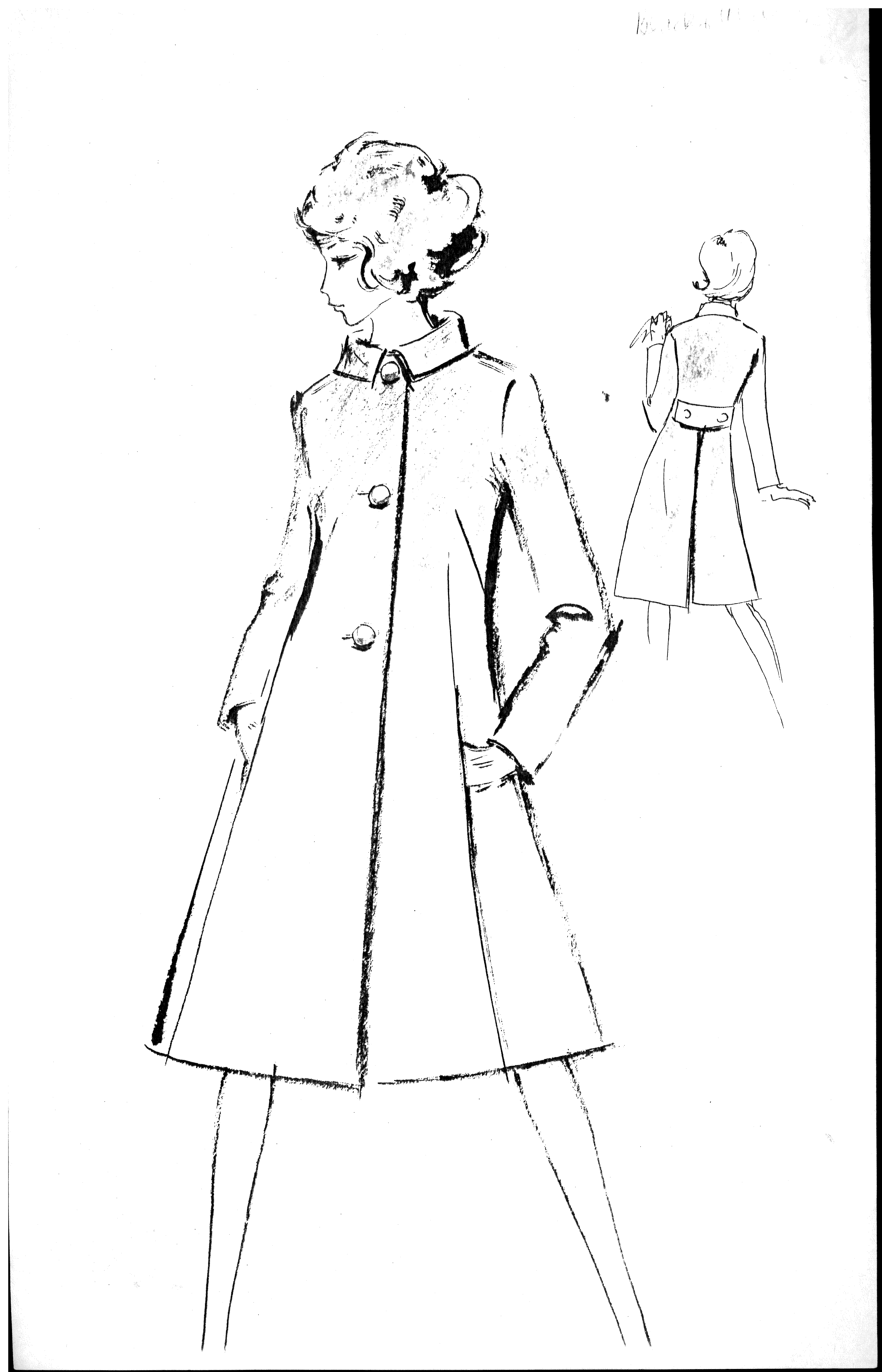

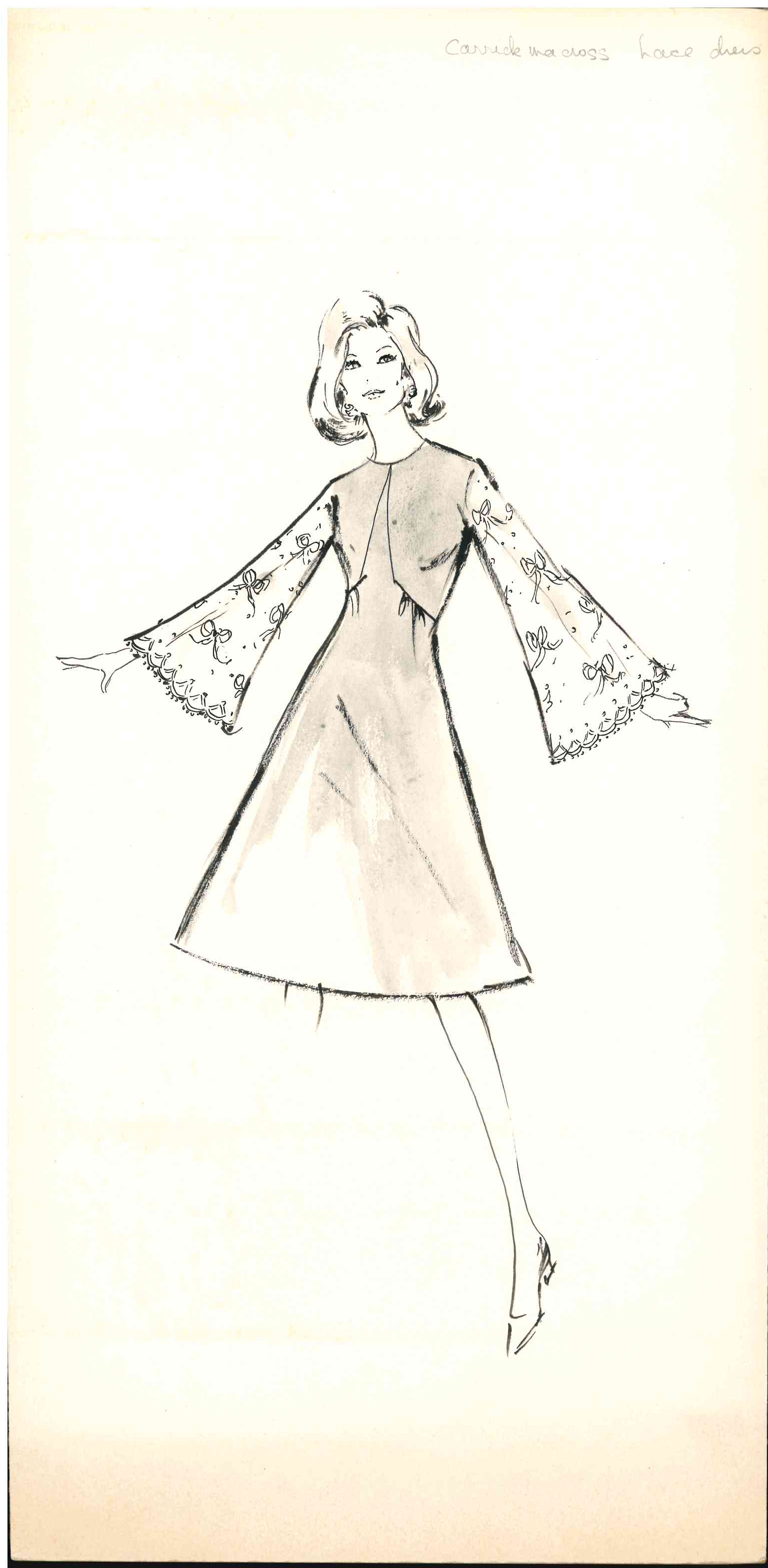

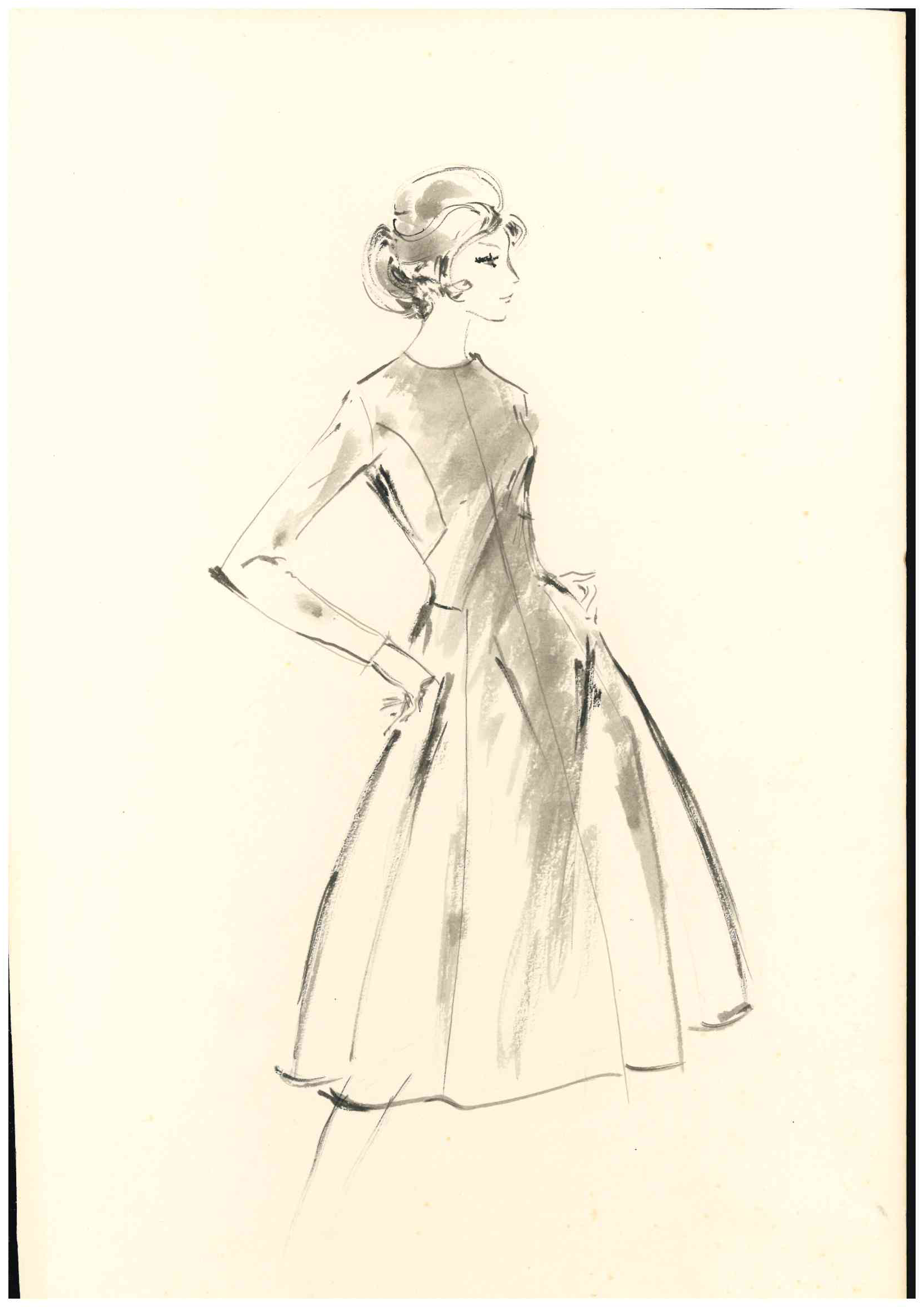

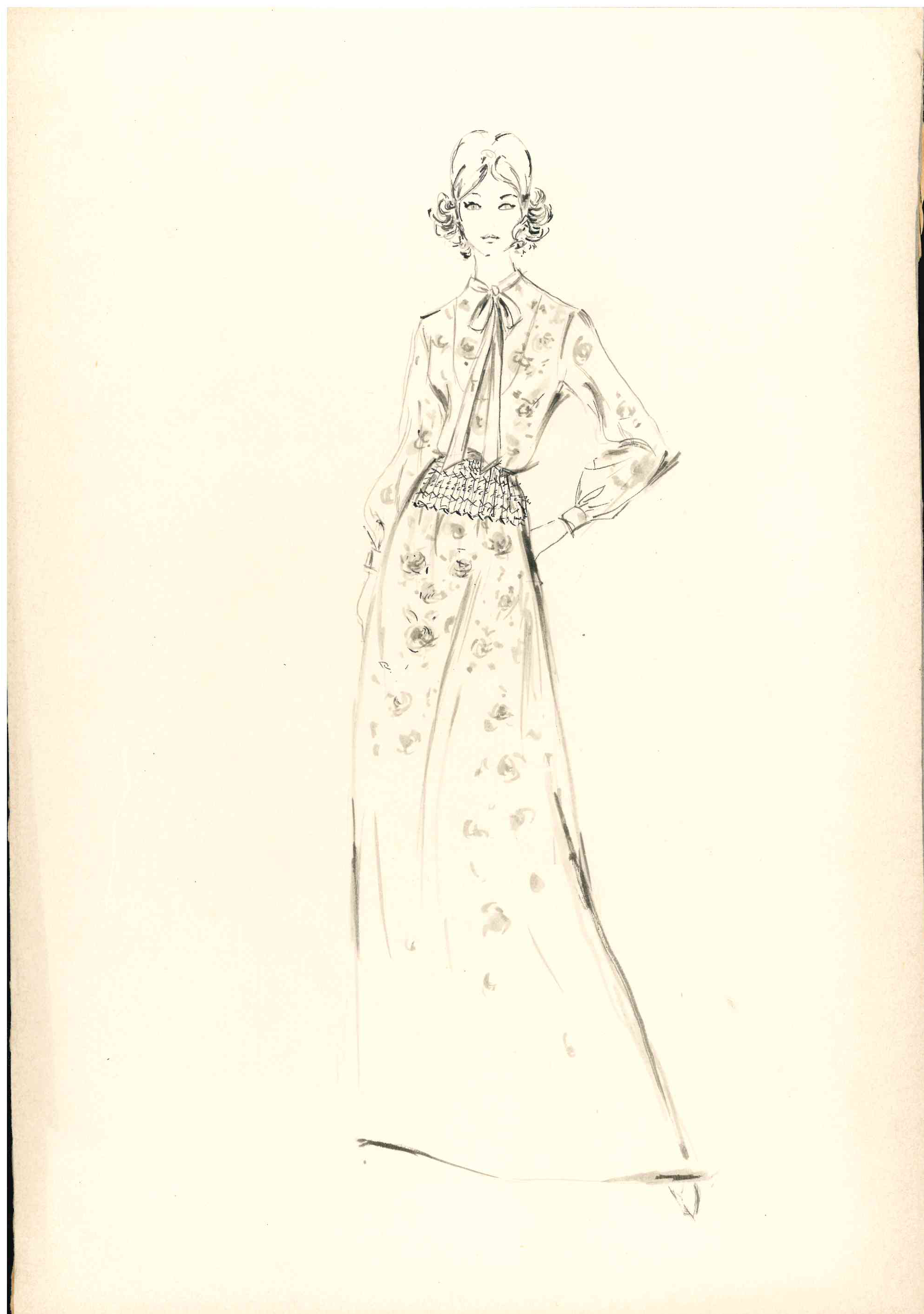

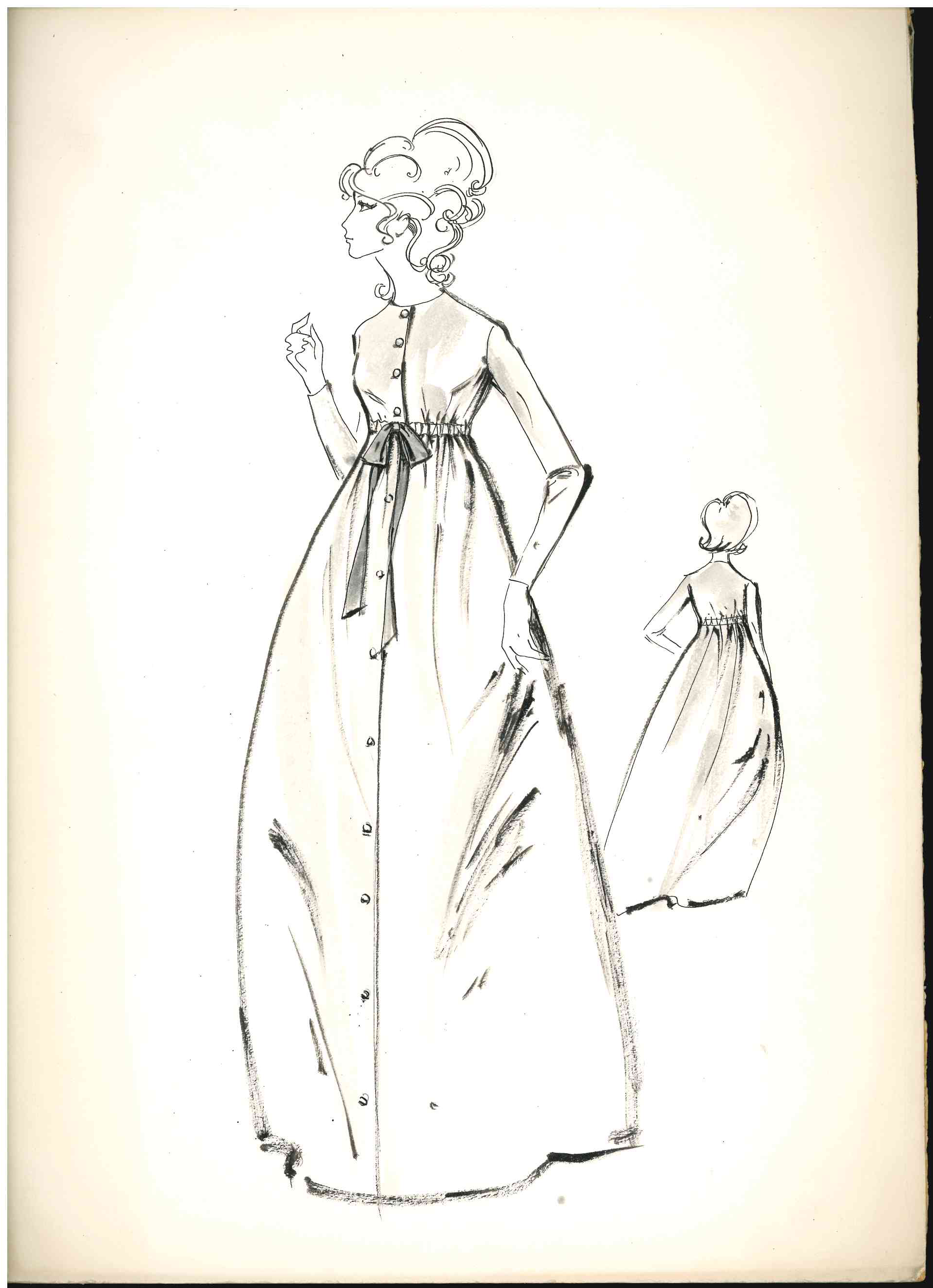

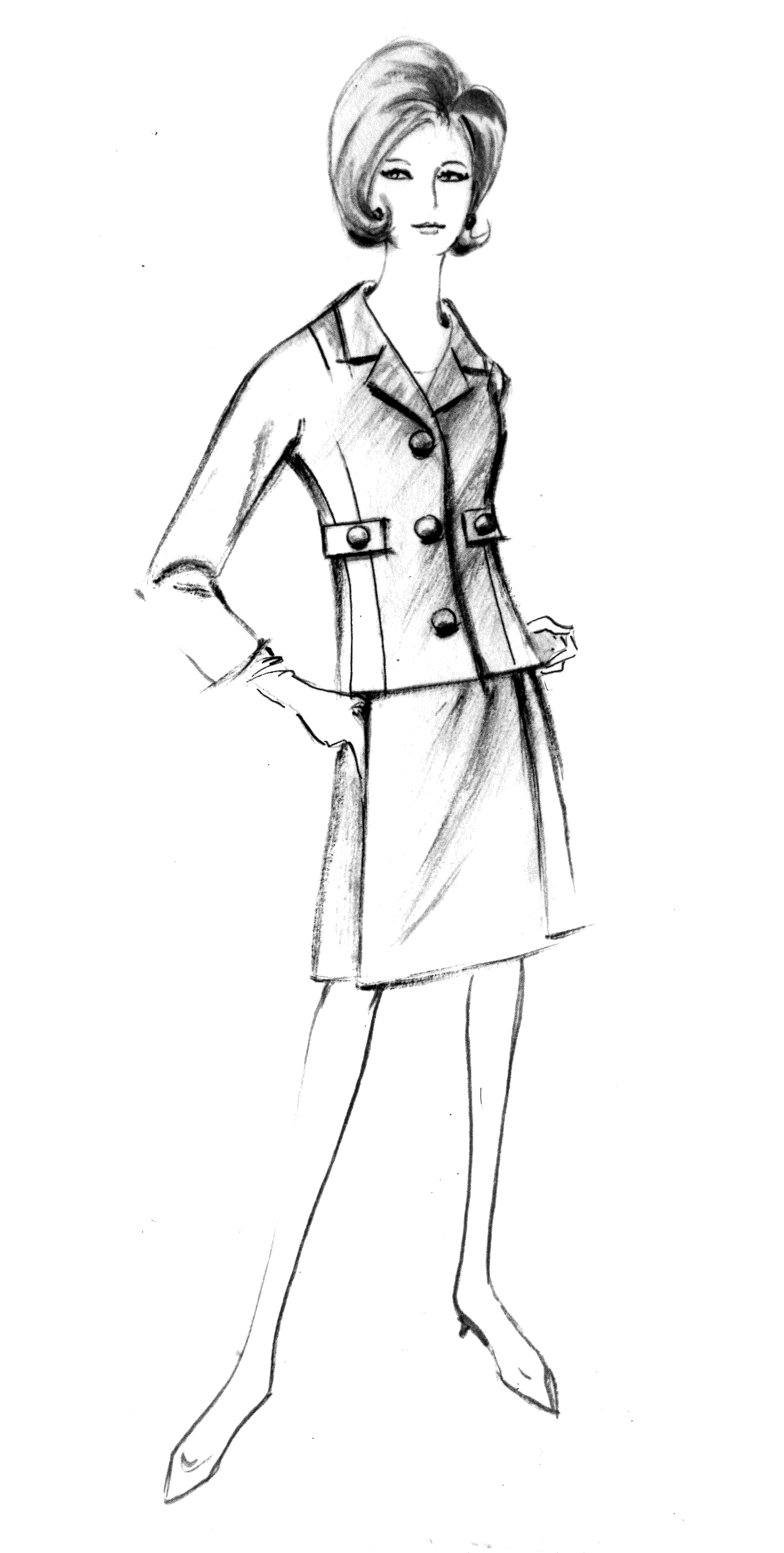

== Bibliography ==
- Connolly, Sybil Irish Hands: The Tradition of Beautiful Crafts, Hearst Books, 1995.
