= Pat Crowley (fashion designer) =

Irish fashion designer (1933–2013)

- Born: Patricia Vernon; 17 May 1933; Taylor's Hill, County Galway
- Died: 16 December 2013 (aged 80)
- Resting place: Rooske Cemetery, Dunboyne, County Meath
- Occupation: Fashion designer
- Spouse: Conor Crowley
- Children: 3
- Awards: Satzenbrau Designer of the Year 1990

Pat Crowley (17 May 1933 – 16 December 2013) was an Irish fashion designer. Her clients included the Irish president Mary Robinson.

== Early and personal life ==
Patricia Crowley, née Vernon, was born in Taylor's Hill County Galway on 17 May 1933. She was the eldest of seven children, her four brothers John, Robert, William and Ray and her two sisters Elizabeth and Anne. Herbert Scott Vernon, Crowley's father, was born in Ballinrobe, County Mayo and worked as a Bank of Ireland agent. Her mother, Netta Vernon née Morrissey, was from Charleville, County Cork.

Herbert Vernon died at the age of 60, his death led her mother to move to America to earn money for the family. Here, she started working as a housekeeper, this being her first job. As Pat's brothers were still in school when their father died, Netta earned enough money working to send home to put them through college.

Crowley met Conor Crowley, from Stillorgan, at an international rugby match in Lansdowne Road. Conor, born 1928, was a partner in Kennedy Crowley. This was a business founded by his father, which then merged to become Stokes Kennedy Crowley accountancy firm (now KPMG). The two married in 1957, but delayed having a family as Crowley wanted to continue her work. In 1968 the couple welcomed their first child, Vernon. They later had two more children, Fiona and Lisa. The family lived in Dolly's Grove, a 62-acre stud farm in Dunboyne, County Meath.

Crowley studied fashion design at Grafton Academy in Dublin, which opened in 1938. It is located at the Grand Canal Dock. She was pushed into going there by her mother, although her father never approved of women getting an education.

== Career ==
When Crowley graduated from the Grafton Academy, she went on to work as an air hostess for Aer Lingus. At the time, being an air hostess was considered a very glamorous job, it provided her with the opportunity to travel and be on the first transatlantic flight out of Ireland. IB Jorgenson was one of the designers of the Aer Lingus uniforms. He also attended the Grafton Academy and later became good friends with Crowley. When Crowley met her husband, it was expected that she would stop working to raise a family, however she decided to continue working. She was not ready for a family and decided to go on the pill, and to get a job. It was rare for a married women to have a job in that time period, but in 1960 Crowley began working for Irene Gilbert.

Irene Gilbert was another leading Irish fashion designer, she is famous for her work and friendship with Grace Kelly. She designed multiple of Grace's outfits, which Crowley would have also worked on. She perfected the designing skills that she learned at Grafton Academy, for example, Draping. Crowley learned a lot about the fashion business from Gilbert. She learned more about fashion design itself, but also sales in fashion, marketing, and management. Crowley travelled to the United States multiple times doing sales and correspondence for Gilbert, this prepared her a lot for when she decided to open her own business. Crowley worked for Gilbert for seven years, until her first child was born.

Crowley then launched her own knitwear business in 1968. She then set up her workshop and store on Duke street in the city centre of Dublin. Crowley's reputation enhanced through the stocking of well known designers such as Valentino, Thierry Mugler and Ungaro to supplement her own designs. Her innovative and creative designs led to a greater demand from her clients. She employed 600 knitters across the country to meet expectations. Her innovative spin on the traditional woollen jumper was the standout of her early designs.

Crowley was becoming an iconic figure in the fashion industry and was starting to make appearances through the media and TV shows, one in particular being "Head To Toe" which was the prime fashion TV show on RTÉ. She appeared on the show in 1992 to showcase her Autumn/Winter collection for that year.

=== Clients ===
Crowley dressed everyone, from presidents to film stars. She spent a lot of her later life still designing and throughout the eighties, she began bringing her clothes to the rich women of America. She had a number of high-profile customers which included Miranda Guinness, Terry Keane and Rosaleen Linehan. Her popularity grew in the US because of her custom fitted clothing and personal interest in all of her customers. Crowley's most noteworthy achievement was the dressing of Mary Robinson when she met Queen Elizabeth in London in 1993, and Pope John Paul in Rome in 1996. Another accolade was when she designed the dress that Marie Heaney wore when her husband Seamus Heaney was awarded the Nobel Prize for Literature in 1995. Crowley received the Satzenbrau Designer of the Year award in 1990. By then, her clothes became more colourful, yet remained elegant. One of Crowley's most well known Irish fashion icons was Miranda Iveagh, known to be one of Ireland's best dressed females. When asked about being dressed by Crowley she said she felt "frightfully happy" dressed in her designs. Iveagh also talked about how Crowley had a way at selling her designs by charming the husbands at spending more money than they anticipated on their wives.

== Later life and death ==
In the mid-to-late 1990s, Crowley's career continued to be busy, as was her husbands. Conor Crowley was competing in the European horse racing championships. The two kept horses on their farm in Dunboyne and rode them every day.

She underwent a hip operation in 1999, which marked a decline in her health. Conor Crowley died on 22 September 1999, when Crowley was in New York. The cause of his death was unknown. It was at this time that she was diagnosed with Alzheimer's disease. In an interview with The Independent, her daughter, Lisa, spoke about her experience with her mother and her Alzheimer's, looking back at one experience in particular,

"..it was like she had disappeared. I brought her in to be diagnosed in November and she was kicking and screaming. I remember it so well, I had taken a half day off from work, she had been riding a horse that morning and she was totally compos mentis in her jodhpurs and riding boots and she said 'You are not going to put me into a loony bin!' She actually got her hand and slapped my arm. I knew that she understood what it would be like. I read her diary two days later and it said 'Lisa brought me to the doctor. I actually was quite glad. I was very frightened. 'It was frightening stuff for everyone concerned, and very emotional."

In her last few years she became difficult, refusing any help or care. She also became very anxious and agitated in situations.

A year later, she decided to retire, closing her boutique in Molesworth Place. She then sold her 62-acre farm for €4.2 million, along with her horses, and moved to Sandymount, Dublin 4. She was later moved into Highfield Healthcare nursing home in Whitehall, under the care of her son Vernon and two daughters Lisa and Fiona. Lisa also spoke in the interview of how Crowley was regressing back to her childhood. Crowley died on 16 December 2013, aged 80 and was buried in Rooske Cemetery, Dunboyne, County Meath.
