= Donegal tweed =

Woven tweed in Ireland

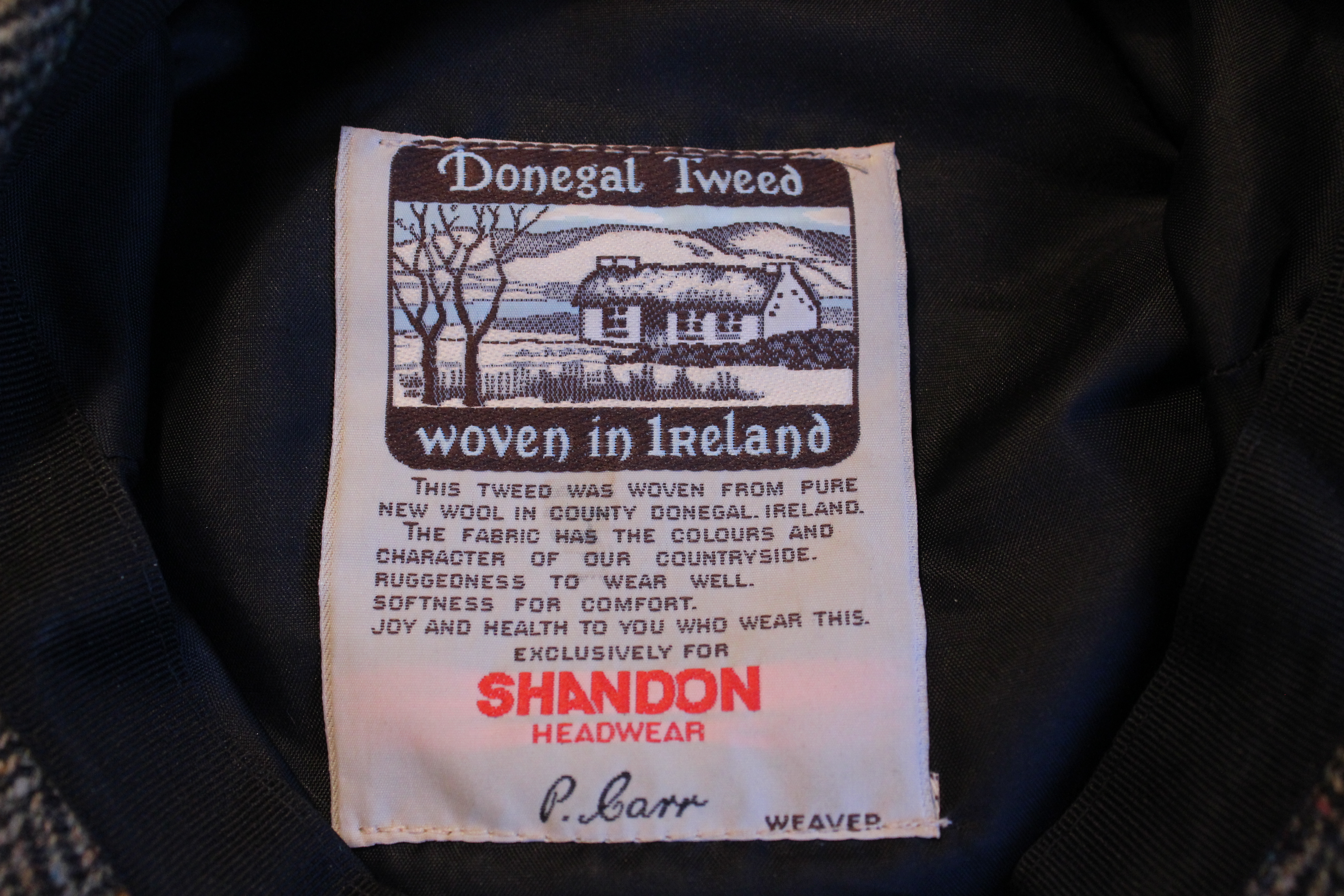
Donegal Tweed Label in a flat cap

Donegal tweed is a woven tweed manufactured in County Donegal, Ireland. Originally all handwoven, it is now mostly machine woven and has been since the introduction of mechanised looms in the 1950s-1960s. Donegal has for centuries been producing tweed from local materials in the making of caps, suits and vests. Towards the end of the eighteenth century, The Royal Linen Manufacturers of Ulster distributed approximately six thousand flax spinning wheels and sixty looms for weaving to various Donegal homesteads. These machines helped establish the homespun tweed industry in nineteenth-century Donegal. The term "Donegal Tweed" was first publicised by May 1869. Although Donegal tweed has been manufactured for centuries it took on its modern form in the 1880s, largely due to the pioneering work of English philanthropist Alice Rowland Hart.

While the weavers in County Donegal produce a number of different tweed fabrics, including herringbone and check patterns, the area is best known for a plain-weave cloth of differently-coloured warp and weft, with small pieces of yarn in various colours woven in at irregular intervals to produce a heathered effect. Such fabric is often labelled as "donegal" (with a lowercase "d") regardless of its provenance.

Along with Harris Tweed manufactured in the Outer Hebrides of Scotland, Donegal is the most famous tweed in the world. It was used in several of the fashion designer Sybil Connolly's pieces.

Linda Reade wrote that the "Donegal Weaver was, and indeed still is, a singular type of man. He normally has a long Celtic face with good long-fingered hands, a highly sensitive touch, an inherent feeling for colour, amazingly dexterous feet and an inbuilt sense of rhythm. This freedom of movement is vigorously displayed in the skilful dancing of jigs and reels at the weaver's parties held each year in Donegal Town."

== Magee of Donegal Town ==
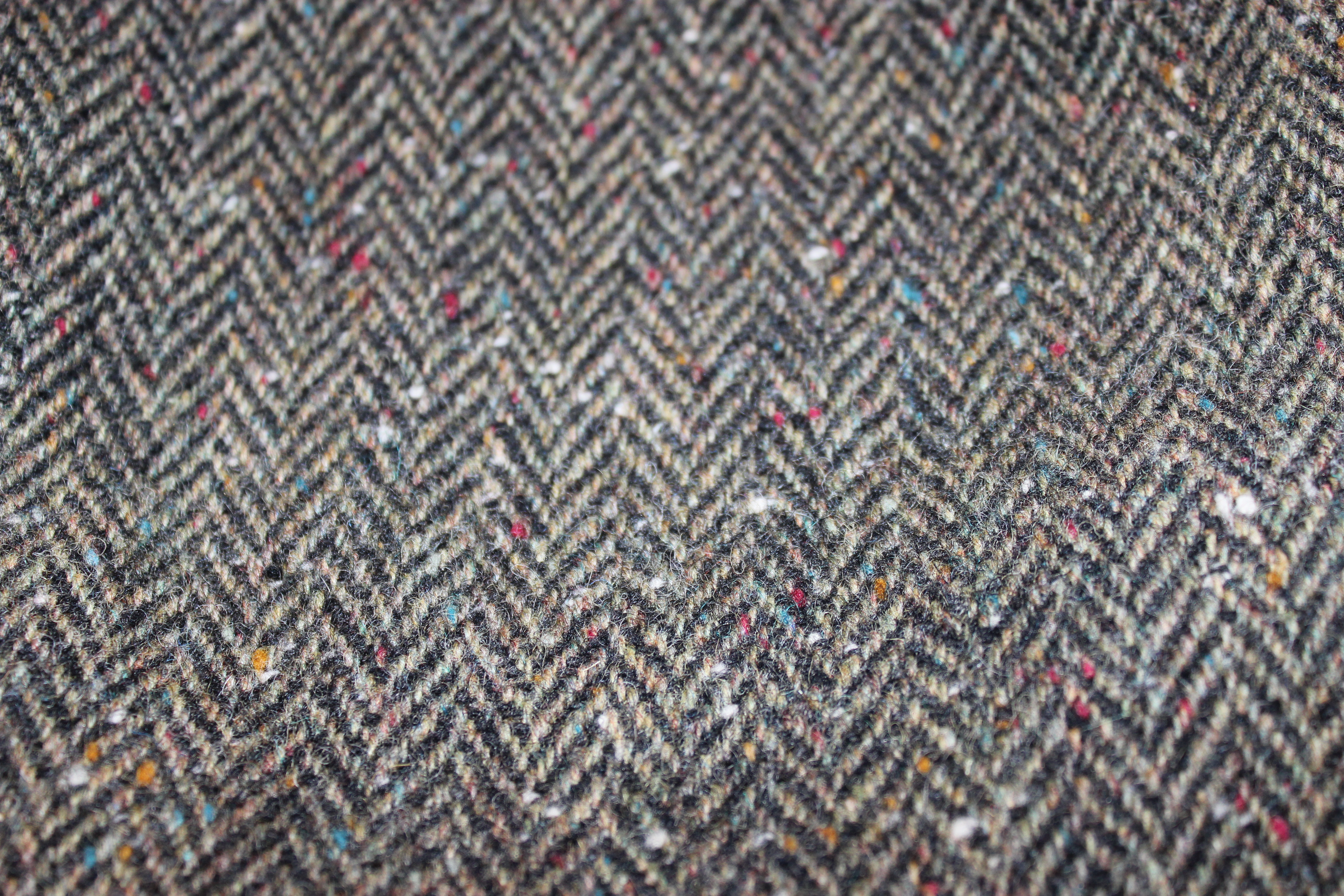
Donegal Tweed fabric – with the characteristic small pieces of yarn in different colours

The firm of Magee dates back to 1866. It was established by John Magee (1849–1901) who established a retail shop in the Diamond, in Donegal (town). He also bought tweed from Ardara and Carrick from part-time weavers who also worked as farmers and fishermen.

In 1887, John Magee's cousin Robert Temple (1866–1958) came to work in the shop as an apprentice. On the death of John Magee in 1901, Temple took over the business. He continued using the outworkers to make tweed, but in order to improve quality, he established a system of sending out patterns and materials to these workers. Later he established a small factory in Donegal Town, where some outworkers worked full-time under his supervision. Robert Temple expanded the business significantly until his death in 1958.

Robert's son Howard Temple (1913–2010) began working with his father in 1931. One of the most significant figures in the history of Donegal tweed, Howard Temple, carried Magee to new heights. The number of weavers (both in-house and out workers) greatly increased, and he began the process of making Donegal tweed an international brand. To this end, he collaborated very closely with the Irish fashion designers Sybil Connolly and Irene Gilbert. In 1966, he also established a large factory in Donegal Town manufacturing ready-to-wear men's clothes, which at its peak employed approximately 300 people.

Magee continues to be the largest and most famous producer of Donegal tweed. Magee clothing is worn by the 9th President of Ireland, Michael D Higgins.

== Donegal tweed and Irish fashion ==
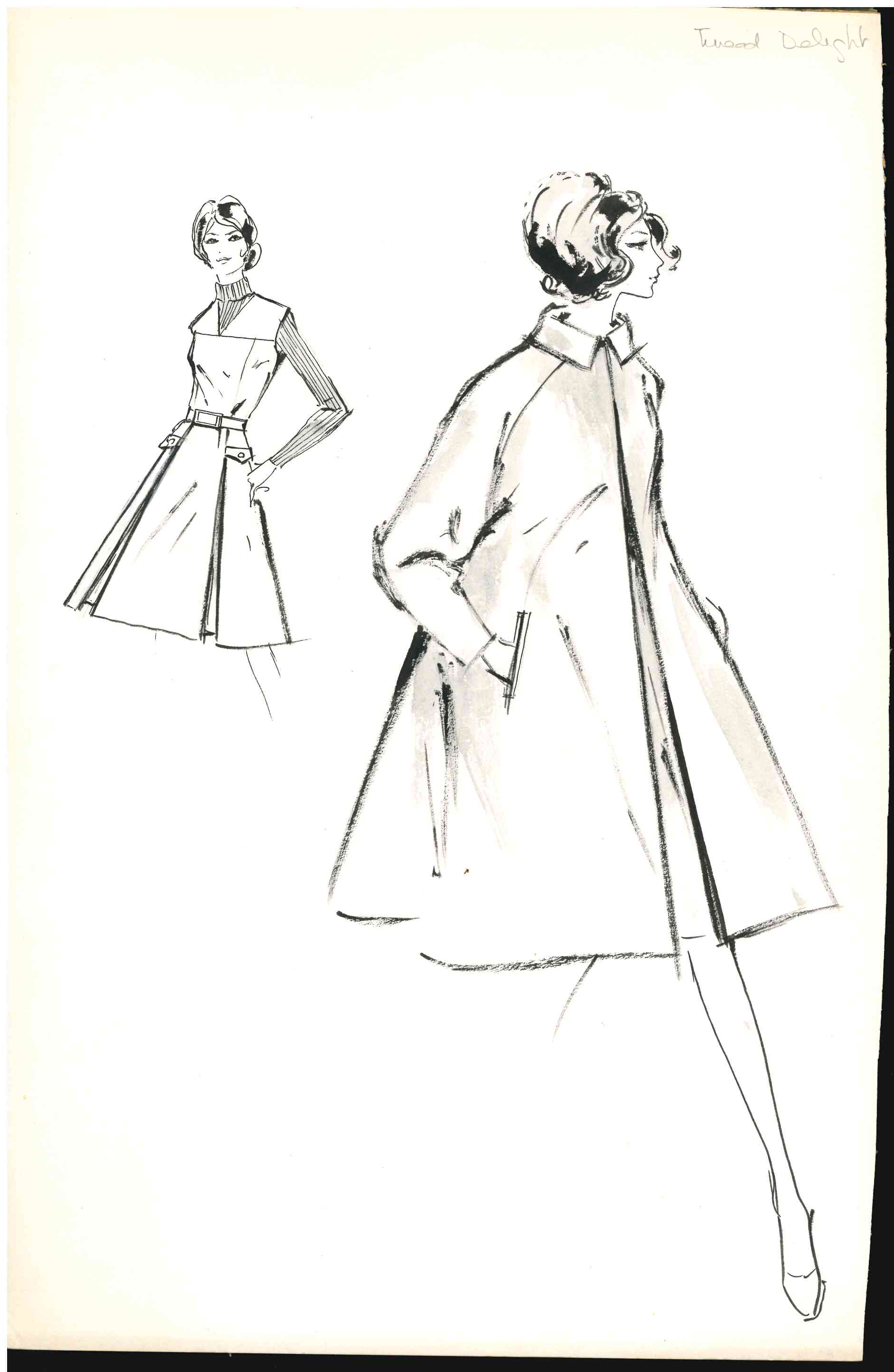
Design sketch for tweed coat given the name 'Tweed Delight'.

During the 1950s and 1960s Irish fashion designers elevated Irish fabrics and used them in their couture designs such as Sybil Connolly, Irene Gilbert and Neillí Mulcahy, with Connolly often using tweed for coats, capes and twin-piece suits. The use of Irish fabrics by such well-known designers brought Irish tweed onto the international couture runways.
