= Pauline Clotworthy =

Irish teacher of fashion design

- Born: Pauline Cecily Elizabeth Keohler; 17 May 1912
- Died: 22 December 2004 (aged 92)
- Occupation: Fashion designer

Pauline Clotworthy (17 May 1912 – 22 December 2004) was an Irish teacher of fashion design.

== Life ==
Pauline Clotworthy was born Pauline Cecily Elizabeth Keohler in Dublin on 17 May 1912. Her father was Robert Nesbitt Keohler, a solicitor, and his second wife, Ethel (née Thompson). Robert's first wife was Ethel's elder sister, Edith Thompson, who had died after the birth of her daughter in 1902. Robert Keohler changed his name to Keller by deed poll two months after the outbreak of World War I, in October 1914.

Clotworthy was educated at Alexandra College, and then went on to attend the Metropolitan School of Art in Dublin from 1931 to 1932. One of her lecturers, Seán Keating, unsuccessfully attempted to stop her from creating fashion sketches during his life drawing classes. Following her interest in fashion, Clotworthy moved to London to attend Browns Paris School of Fashion on Bond Street. Taking advice from the advertising manager of Arnotts in Dublin, Ronald Nesbitt, she returned to London to enrol in the British Institute of Dress Designers. There she learnt pattern-making, cutting, and garment construction alongside fellow students such as Hardy Amies. She completed the course in May 1938. She noticed that there was no equivalent training school in Ireland, and with the help of her father, she went about establishing The Grafton Academy of Dress Designing and Millinery at 6 St Stephens Green.

Her first 15 students begun their training in 1938, and within a few years the annual student show became a feature of the Dublin society calendar. Many prominent designers taught at the school, including Neillí Mulcahy, whilst others were pupils such as Ib Jorgensen. As the only such fashion design training in Ireland for a number of years, Clotworthy was described at the academy's 70th anniversary as the "backbone of the Irish clothing trade".

She married Neil Desmond Clotworthy (1917–1992) in 1940. He was an officer in Irish army, who was born in Saskatchewan, Canada to Irish parents. The couple had two daughters and one son. Clotworthy died on 22 December 2004 at the Blackrock Clinic. She is buried at the Friends' burial ground, Blackrock.
