= Jacqueline Quinn =

20th and 21st-century Irish fashion designer and consultant

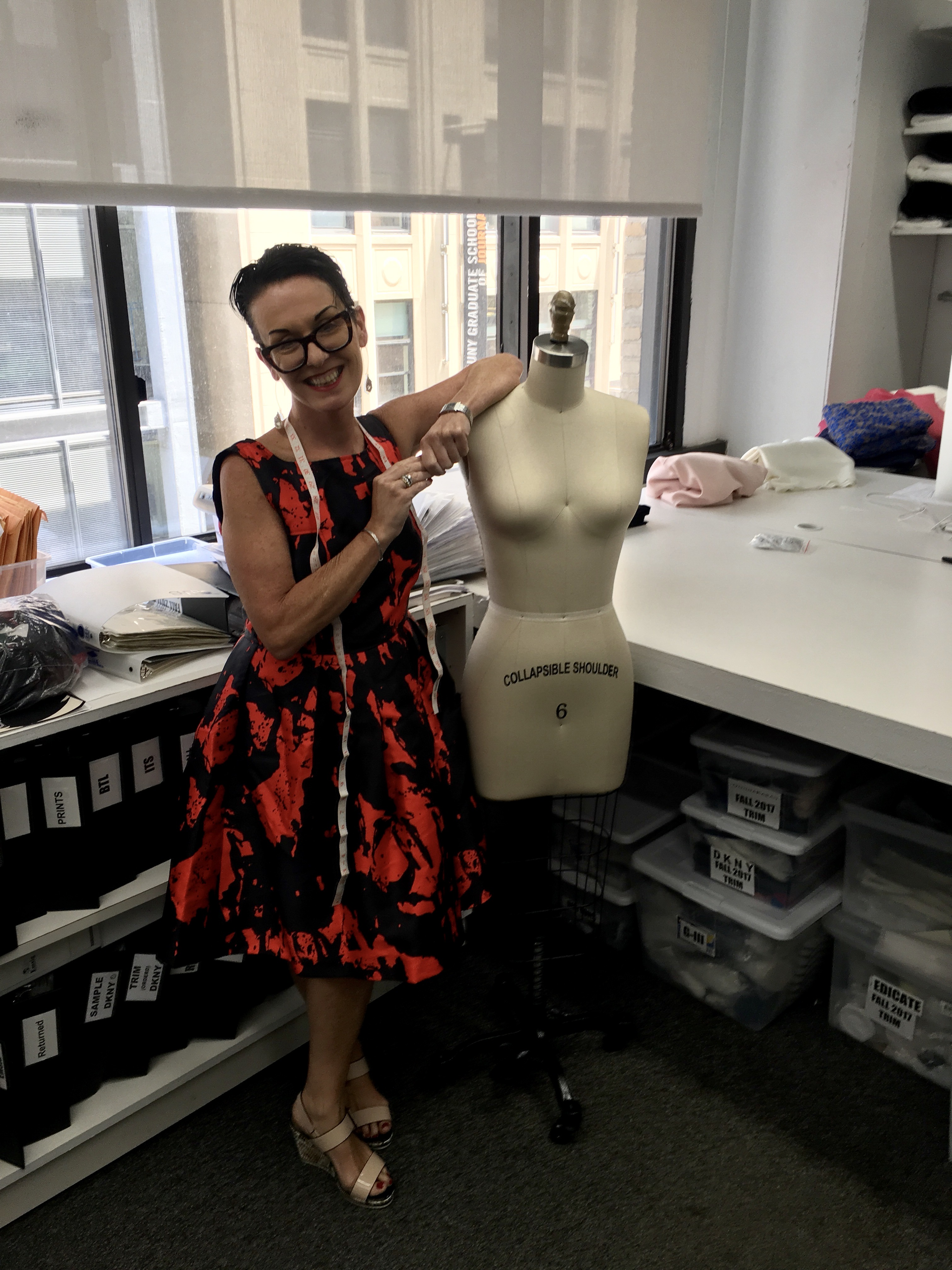
- Quinn in her NYC Studio
- Born: Jacqueline Quinn; April 8, 1965 (age 61); Dublin, Ireland
- Education: The Grafton Academy of Fashion Design
- Occupations: Fashion Designer; Consultant
- Years active: 1985–present

Jacqueline Quinn (born April 8, 1965) is an Irish-born, New York-based, fashion designer and consultant.

== Early life ==
Quinn was born in Dublin, Ireland where she graduated from the Grafton Academy of Fashion Design in 1986. She grew up in Howth, and worked as a designer for Irish and English clients before relocating to New York in 1995.

== Career ==
Quinn began her career in 1985 working as an intern with Willy Smith. She then worked with a British manufacturer who designed clothing for retailers including British Home Stores, Marks & Spencer, and Topshop. In 1995, Quinn moved to New York and began designing for John Roberts Corporation a supplier to Nordstrom, Lord & Taylor, Macy's and Dillards. She then began working as a designer for brands including Perry Ellis and Bill Blass. In 2005, she launched Quinn New York Inc., which includes her eponymous collection.

Quinn's designs are aimed at women in their mid-thirties or older looking for contemporary, age appropriate clothing. – a market that has not been well served. She estimates that 45 percent of her customer base is in southern cities, such as Atlanta and Dallas where women tend to dress up more often and want colorful clothing. "Women in their 30s and 40s look better than ever, and they want clothing that looks stylish and feminine. She has been praised by influential magazines such as Women's Wear Daily and Fashion Manuscript, which reported: "Quinn has produced a product that fits a woman's body well, is age appropriate and still has a great sense of style and a contemporary look." The Sunday Independent has also praised her clothing designs.

Throughout her career, Quinn has collaborated with many brands. Working in association with New Balance to raise breast cancer awareness, Quinn constructed a gown made entirely of shoe material to be worn by Miss USA. In 2011 she helped raise money for a cancer research foundation.

In 2013 Quinn constructed a dress made predominantly from parts of sunglasses by Randolph Engineering which was then worn by singer Nadia Turner live at The Hard Rock Cafe in Boston.

In May 2013, Quinn launched her first handbag collection consisting of twelve embellished bags made as a tribute to ‘Old Hollywood’. Some of the bags in the collection included "Lady Eve", "Lady Grace" and "Lady Oscar". InStyle Magazine chose the "Gabrielle" clutch as the best evening wear bag. It featured a lambskin lining and was embellished with over 130 square-cut crystals. As an avid philanthropist, Quinn partnered with several stay-at-home mothers, living in India, to create the collection. The women completed piecework for the bags which was shipped to a factory for final assembly. As an example, "The Lady Monroe" handbag featured over 200 seashells, hand-collected, cut and shaped by these women. This arrangement offered single mothers and stay-at-home women an opportunity to contribute financially to their households.

Quinn has worked with celebrity clients including Hannah Storm, Rachael Ray, Sarah, Duchess of York as well as department stores including Macy's and Lord and Taylor. Irish Rock Violinists Sephira also frequently wear custom-made designs for their performances. Jacqueline has also designed and fitted Couture pieces for Robert F Kennedy's daughter, Kathleen Kennedy Townsend. The singer, Estelle, was also dressed by Jacqueline for the 2012 Grammy’s. The following year Jacqueline was asked to design something fabulous for Billy Vera who won a Grammy for his song writing for Ricky Nelson and Dolly Parton to name a few.

In 2014, Quinn was on the judging panel for the Design for Brad Smith competition which offered young, emerging designers the chance to spearhead a collection for NFL Philadelphia Eagles player Brad Smith. Winner Kassie Haji was crowned at an award ceremony in Chelsea during New York Fashion Week 2014.

Jacqueline was the head Designer with Jessica Simpson and Guess, and when Morris Goldfarb, CEO of G-III bought DKNY he asked Jacqueline to be the head Designer for the dress division. Jacqueline Quinn & Betsey Johnson: In 2016, Jacqueline Quinn became the creative Director for Betsey Johnson and was responsible for the revival of the 1990 runway collection exclusively for Urban Outfitters which was the most successful brand launch. During her 2 years as the creative Director, for both day time and evening dresses Jacqueline was responsible for the growth of the Betsey Johnson brand to a new generation of customers.

Jacqueline Quinn & Further Education: Early 2019, Jacqueline was accepted to Harvard University. As a mature student, she embraced her studies of the Visual Arts. This then opened up an opportunity to continue further due to her love of Academia. Jacqueline started her Masters in Fashion, Design and Business with the American College /The Grafton Academy and graduated with honors in 2020.

Jacqueline Quinn, The Educator: In 2019 Jacqueline started her career as an educator at the Fashion Institute of Technology where she was a lecturer for the pre-college programs. Upon completion of her Masters, she was offered a position as Adjunct Professor where she taught final year portfolio Design for graduating students. Jacqueline currently teaches two courses in Fashion Design at The Fashion Institute of Technology.

In October 2021 Jacqueline was offered a Professorship at Parsons, The New School. Due to her practical experience in the Fashion industry fused with her business instincts, it was only natural for Jacqueline to teach “Fashion Entrepreneurship“.

Jacqueline’s new collection was launched in New York and Europe earlier this year with couture pieces from Om Diva Boutique, Dublin. Jacqueline is now focused on creating the new collection, and remains a consultant with major brands in fashion on a platform in the global arena.

Irish Central states that Quinn "continues to impress and represents Irish designers in a market where many have failed before her".

== Awards ==
- Best Evening Wear Designer Hollywood Fashion Awards 2012.

== Personal life ==
Quinn is married to forensic pathologist Brian O'Reilly.
