= Irene Gilbert (fashion designer) =

Irish fashion designer

Ireland's first couturier

Irene Gilbert (1908 – 7 August 1985) (pronounced "Irini") was born in Thurles, County Tipperary. She was an Irish fashion designer based in Dublin. Ireland's first couturier, she was a member of the "Big Three" Irish fashion designers, along with Sybil Connolly and Raymond Kenna/Kay Peterson. Designing for royalty and high society, she was famous for her work and friendship with Grace Kelly. She was the first woman to run a successful fashion business in Ireland, operating out of a shop on St Stephen's Green on the southside of the city.

== Early life ==
Gilbert was born in Thurles, County Tipperary in 1908.

Gilbert attended Alexandra College, after which she spent a short amount of time at a Belgian finishing school.

== Work ==
Gilbert's career in the fashion industry began when she ran a dress shop on Wicklow Street in Dublin. She then went to London to train under a court dressmaker, before returning to open a hat shop on Dublin's North Frederick Street in the late 1940s.

Having moved to St Stephen's Green, Gilbert opened a shop there in 1947. She began selling clothes under her own label from 1950, since her first show took place in Restaurant Jammet. She was known for her work with silk, tweed, linen and Carrickmacross lace. Future celebrated designer, Pat Crowley, worked for Gilbert for seven years from 1960, as a designer as well as a sales and marketing specialist. The quality of the work contributed to Dublin's reputation as a "must stop-over" for the international fashion media. In 1962, Gilbert co-founded the Irish Haute Couture Group with Ib Jorgensen and Nelli Mulcahy.

She designed one of the ten variations of the Aer Lingus uniform.

Gilbert closed the business in 1969 and emigrated to Malta. She later moved to Cheltenham in England where she died in 1985.

== Legacy ==
Gilbert's creations were prized by Anne, Countess of Rosse whose collection of Gilberts are now curated at Birr Castle. The National Museum of Ireland holds some of her letters and drawings, as well as some of her clothes. In January 2018, Gilbert's life and work was part of an exhibition at the Little Museum of Dublin.
