= The Grafton Academy =

Private college in Dublin, Ireland

The Grafton Academy of Fashion Design is a third level college based in Dublin, Ireland. It offers an undergraduate 3-year full-time Diploma course in Fashion Design as well as short courses in Fashion Design, dressmaking, pattern drafting, garment construction, millinery, art and design on a full or part-time basis.

== History ==
The Grafton Academy of Fashion Design was founded in 1938 by Pauline Elizabeth Keller Clotworthy. Born in 1912, Clotworthy was brought up in a large house in Glenageary, with several generations of family around her. Pauline showed a keen interest in sketching and writing and went on to study at Dublin's Metropolitan School of Art (now the National College of Art and Design). It was there that one of her tutors, artist Seán Keating cautioned her on turning her life drawing into fashion illustrations, this only encouraged her to go on to study the art of representing fabrics and textures using watercolour in Browns Paris School of Fashion in London. Upon her return to Dublin, Clotworthy was advised by Arnotts department store manager Ronald Nesbit, to further educate herself on how to realise her fashion drawings. She returned to London to train at the British institute of Dress Designing (Hardy Amies was a fellow student). Understanding that she had benefited from an education that was not available in Ireland, she decided she wanted to share the skills she had acquired. Shortly after graduating in 1938, Clotworthy established the Grafton Academy, Ireland's first design school and within a year it had staged its debut show. Early graduates from the college include Neilli Mulcahy, Ib Jorgensen and Clodagh Phillips, all of whom made a significant contribution in promoting Irish fashion culture, both home and abroad.

As of 2018, the Grafton Academy is managed by Clotworthy's daughter Suzanne Marr.

== Alumni ==
Alumni of the college include:

- Louise Kennedy
- Paul Costelloe
- Liz Quinn
- Carolyn Donnelly
- Sharon Hoey
- Patrick Casey
- Ib Jorgensen
- Neilli Mulcahy
- Clodagh Phillips
- Richard Lewis
- Lorcan Mullany (Bellville Sassoon Lorcan Mullany)
- Sean Byrne
- Umit Kutluk
- Emma Manley
- Jacqueline Quinn
