= Sven Bylander =

Swedish engineer

Sven Bylander (1877–1943) was a Swedish engineer who created steel reinforced buildings, designing some of the first steel-framed buildings in London. His frames included the Ritz Hotel and Selfridges Department Store, which were two of his most memorable works. His standardization methods were instrumental in development of the LCC (General Powers) Act 1909.

== Biography ==
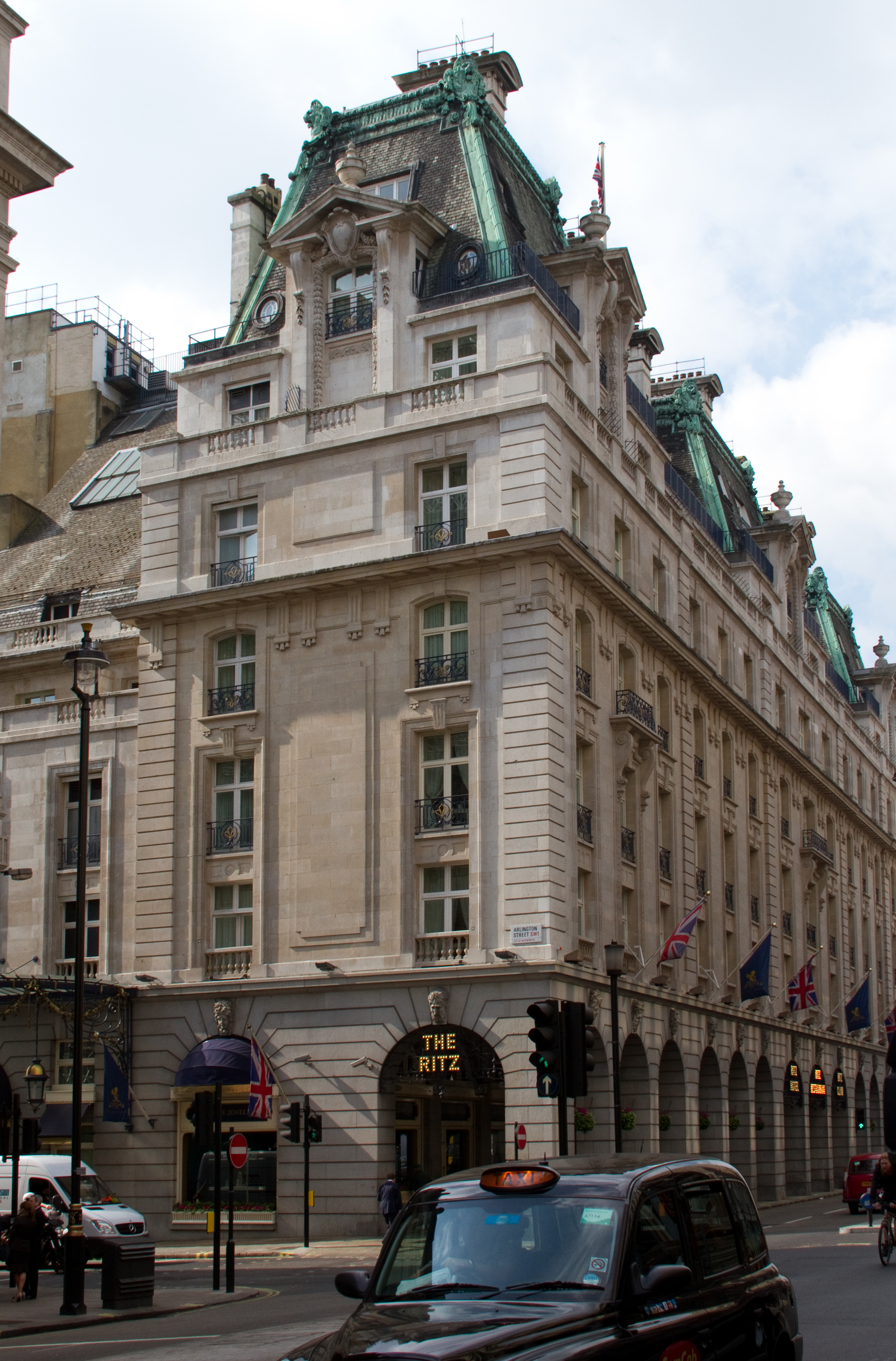
The Ritz Hotel, London

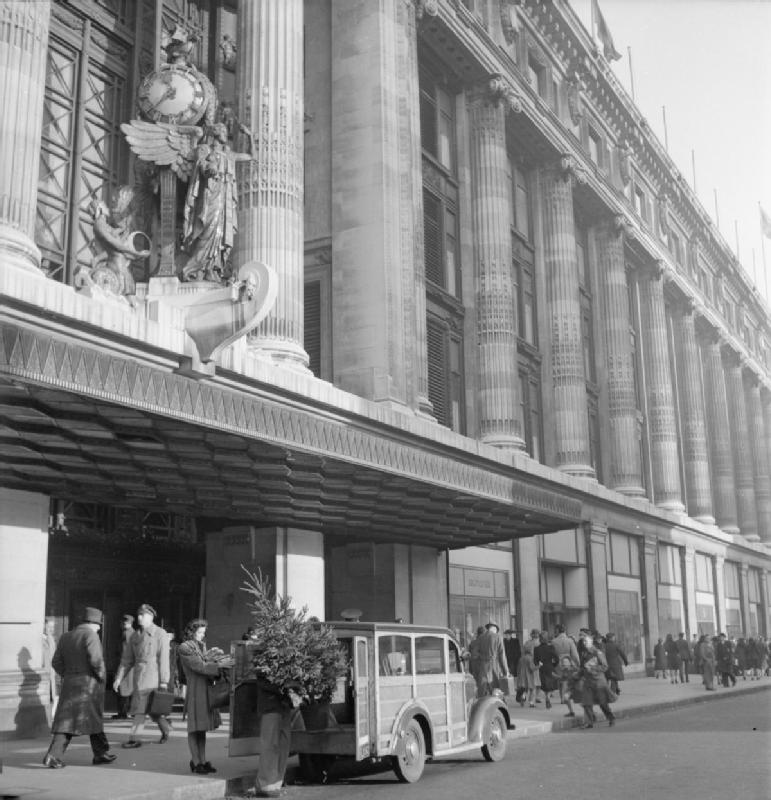
Selfridges (1944)

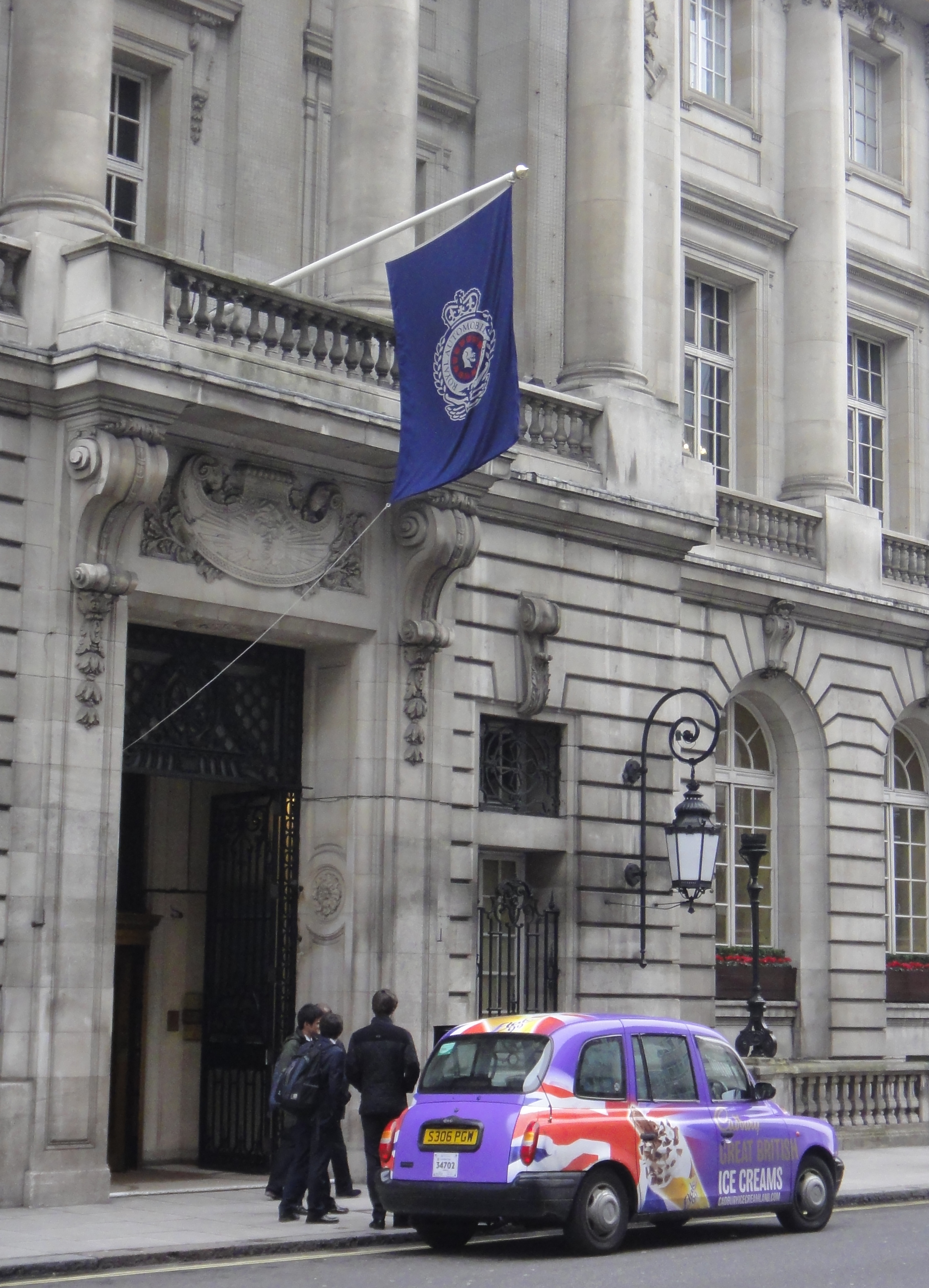
London Royal Automobile Club

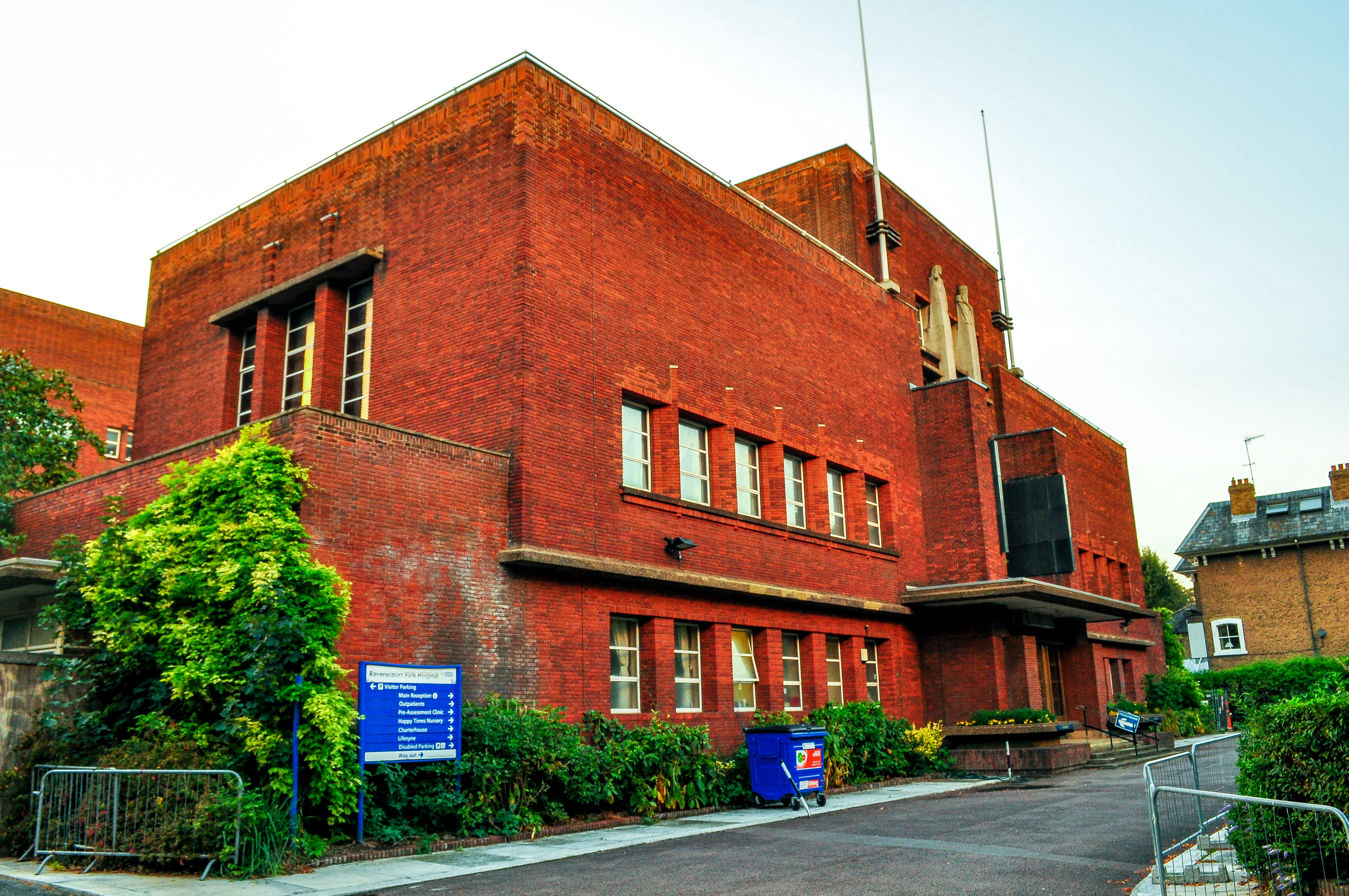
Ravenscourt Park Hospital

Sven Bylander was born in 1877 in Sweden. He learned about steel in a shipyard and incorporated that knowledge into buildings beginning in Germany and the US. He arrived in London in 1902 and was employed by the Waring White Building Company. Prior to Bylander, British building codes and methods of using steel and concrete were haphazard and described by colleagues as consisting of "builders, in using steelwork in building simply piled one piece on top of another, stuck a few bolts in and called it constructional steelwork". The methods he brought to Britain and the influence of Harry Gordon Selfridge and the Concrete Institute led to the passing of the LCC (General Powers) Act 1909, also called the Steel Frame Act which for the first time, regulated construction of steel-reinforced structures.

Between 1904 and 1905, Bylander was hired as structural engineer for the architects Charles Mewès and Arthur J. Davis of Mewès and Davis, in the building of the Ritz Hotel, London's first important steel-framed building. The building attracted daily press notices on its progress and the innovations Bylander used, from his standardized drafting methods, to the numbering system of parts, to the cranes used to lift the steel beams into place.

In 1906, he was hired by Daniel Burnham, lead architect on the project, to assist with fireproofing and design of the structure to be built for Selfridges Department Store in London. Bylander found a warehouse in the Docklands district, made plans and contacted the Metropolitan Buildings Office. By 1907 his plan was approved and construction commenced finishing a year and a half later. Between 1908 and 1911 he built the Royal Automobile Club (RAC Club) with architects Mewès and Davis and in 1919 he designed the Bryant and May Factory in Liverpool, which is believed to be the earliest flat concrete slab construction in Britain.

The Ravenscourt Park Hospital, built in 1933, was the largest independent hospital in Europe when it was built and Bylander designed not only its steel frame, but the semi-circular cantilevered sun balconies as well.

He died 9 October 1943 in London.

== Legacy ==
Bylander's sketches and designs are still in use and are currently held by The Building Archives. The firm Bylander (2000) Ltd. evolved from the firm founded by Sven Bylander and was dissolved in 1999.
