= Rose Selfridge =

Wife of Harry Gordon Selfridge

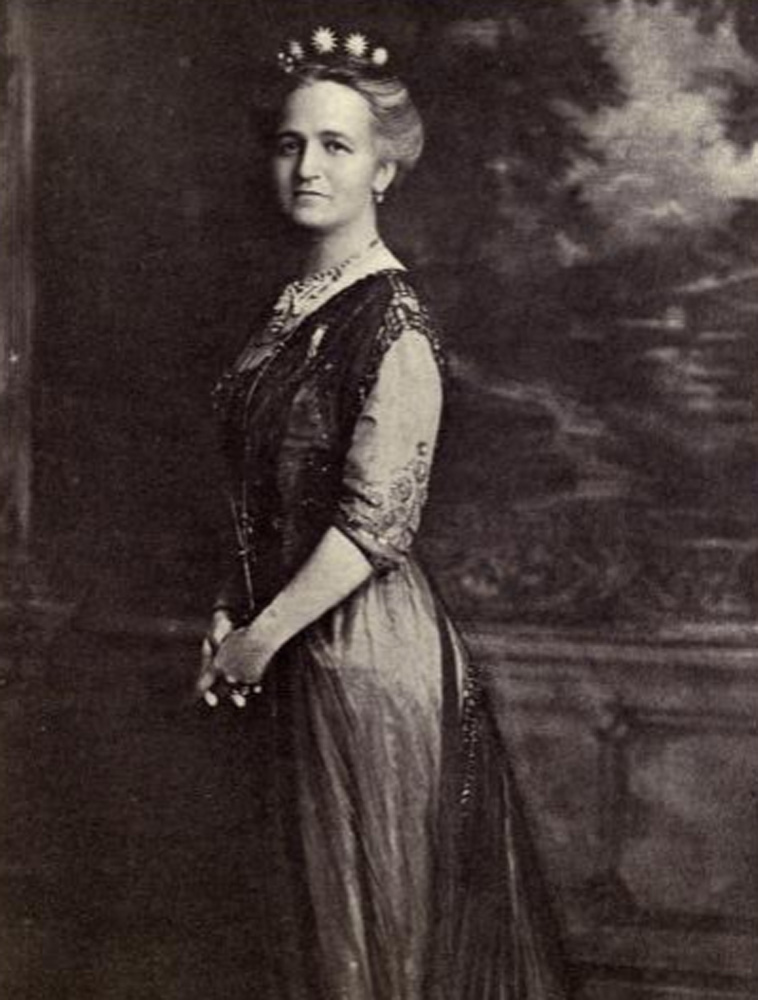
- Rose Selfridge circa 1910
- Born: Rosalie Amelia Buckingham; 5 July 1860; Chicago, Illinois, U.S.
- Died: 12 May 1918 (aged 57); Highcliffe, Dorset, UK
- Resting place: St. Mark's Churchyard, Highcliffe
- Spouse: Harry Gordon Selfridge (m. 1890)
- Children: 5
- Relatives: Kate Sturges Buckingham

Rosalie Amelia Selfridge (née Buckingham; 5 July 1860 – 12 May 1918) was a property developer before becoming the wife of department store magnate Harry Gordon Selfridge. A member of the wealthy Buckingham family of Chicago, she inherited a large amount of investment property. Well educated, she had traveled extensively by the time she met Marshall Field's retail executive Harry Selfridge in the late 1880s. After they were married, the couple remained in Chicago and Rose enjoyed society and her growing family. Later, they moved to London in 1907 when Harry built his new department store on Oxford Street. During World War I, she joined the Red Cross and operated part of their Dorset, England estate as a war-time convalescent hospital. Rose died there during the Spanish flu pandemic.

Her story was portrayed in the television series Mr Selfridge, where she is shown as the patient wife (played by Frances O'Connor) of the famous retailer during their early years in England.

== Early life ==
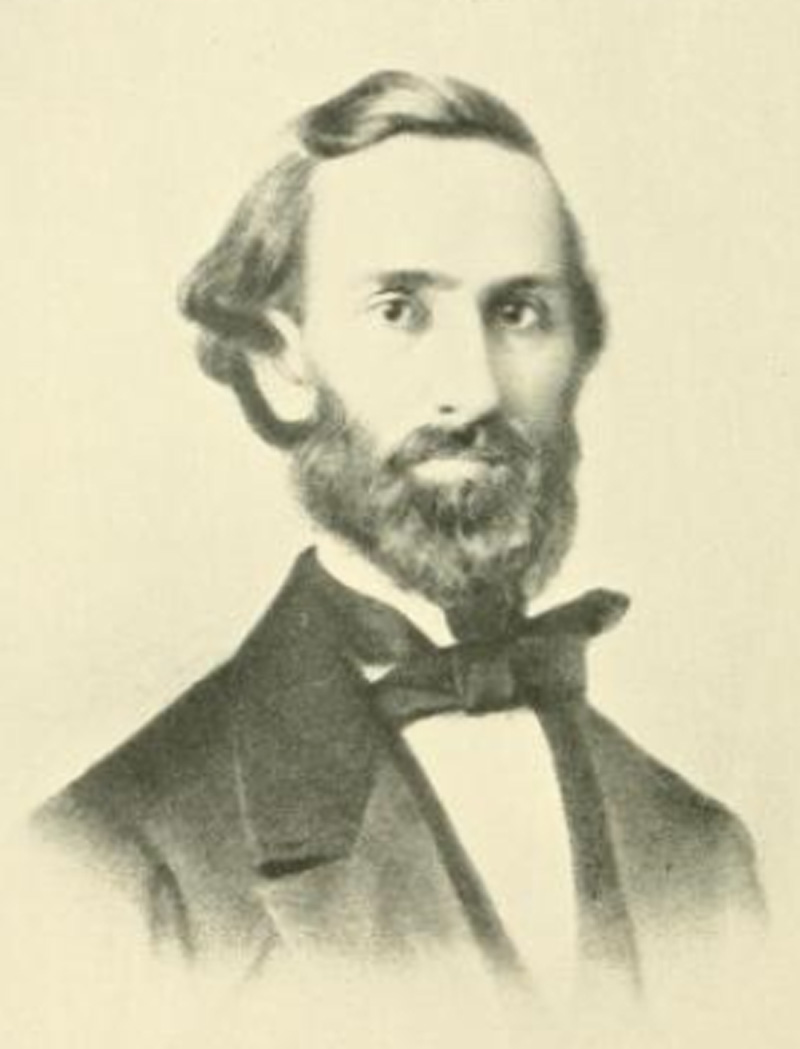
Benjamin Hale Buckingham, father of Rose Selfridge.

Rosalie (Rose) Amelia Buckingham was born in 1860 in Chicago, Illinois. Her father was Benjamin Hale Buckingham, and her mother was Martha Euretta Potwin. Her grandfather was Alvah Buckingham, who had founded the firm Buckingham and Sturges. This firm built the first grain elevator in Chicago and signed a contract with the Illinois Central Railway to handle all of their grain warehousing for ten years. Rose's father Benjamin was part of this family business. Unfortunately, he died in 1864 when Rose was only four years old.

Despite her father's death, Rose's family continued to live well. The 1870 census shows that Rose, her mother Martha and her sister Anna each had inherited considerable wealth consisting of both property and money. Between the ages of 13 and 19, Rose acquired an education by traveling through Europe with her mother, studying languages and music. She was said to be a very gifted harpist and was described by a Chicago socialite in the following terms.

Rose Buckingham, belonging to a distinguished family, was as lovely in mind as she was in body. I think when she stood beside the harp, which she played beautifully, she was an inspiration to those who saw her. A great favorite in society, she was generous in contributing her skill on the harp for charitable purposes. She loved her art and was always willing to help others.

Between the ages of 24 and 28, Rose traveled through Europe, Russia and the Middle East with several members of the Buckingham family. She appears to have been sensitive about her age, as in some of her travel documents she subtracted up to six years from her true birth date. She met Harry Selfridge when she was about 28 and married him in 1890 at the age of 30. Rose and Harry eventually had five children, three girls and two boys (one of whom died as an infant).

At that time, Selfridge worked for the department store firm of Marshall Field & Co., where he rose in time to become an executive, and eventually a partner. Rose, meanwhile, was already a 30-year-old successful property developer in her own right; she had inherited both money and expertise from her family. In 1883, Rose had purchased land on Harper Avenue between 57th Street and 59th Street in Hyde Park, Chicago and hired architect Solon S. Beman to create a row of elegant homes, which came to be known as the Rosalie Villas. Beman supervised the project and designed most but not all of the homes. W. W. Boyington designed a brick home for brick manufacturer Charles Bonner, which Bonner built in 1889 at 5752 S. Harper Ave. Using Beman's plans, Rose built a total of 42 villas and artists' cottages within a landscaped environment. Most of them survive fairly intact, but the Rosalie Inn and Cafe on the southwest corner of 57th and Harper was demolished; the restaurant was once known as the Café Red Roses. The inn marked the entrance to Rosalie Court. Powell's Bookstore now stands on that lot.

== Life in Chicago ==
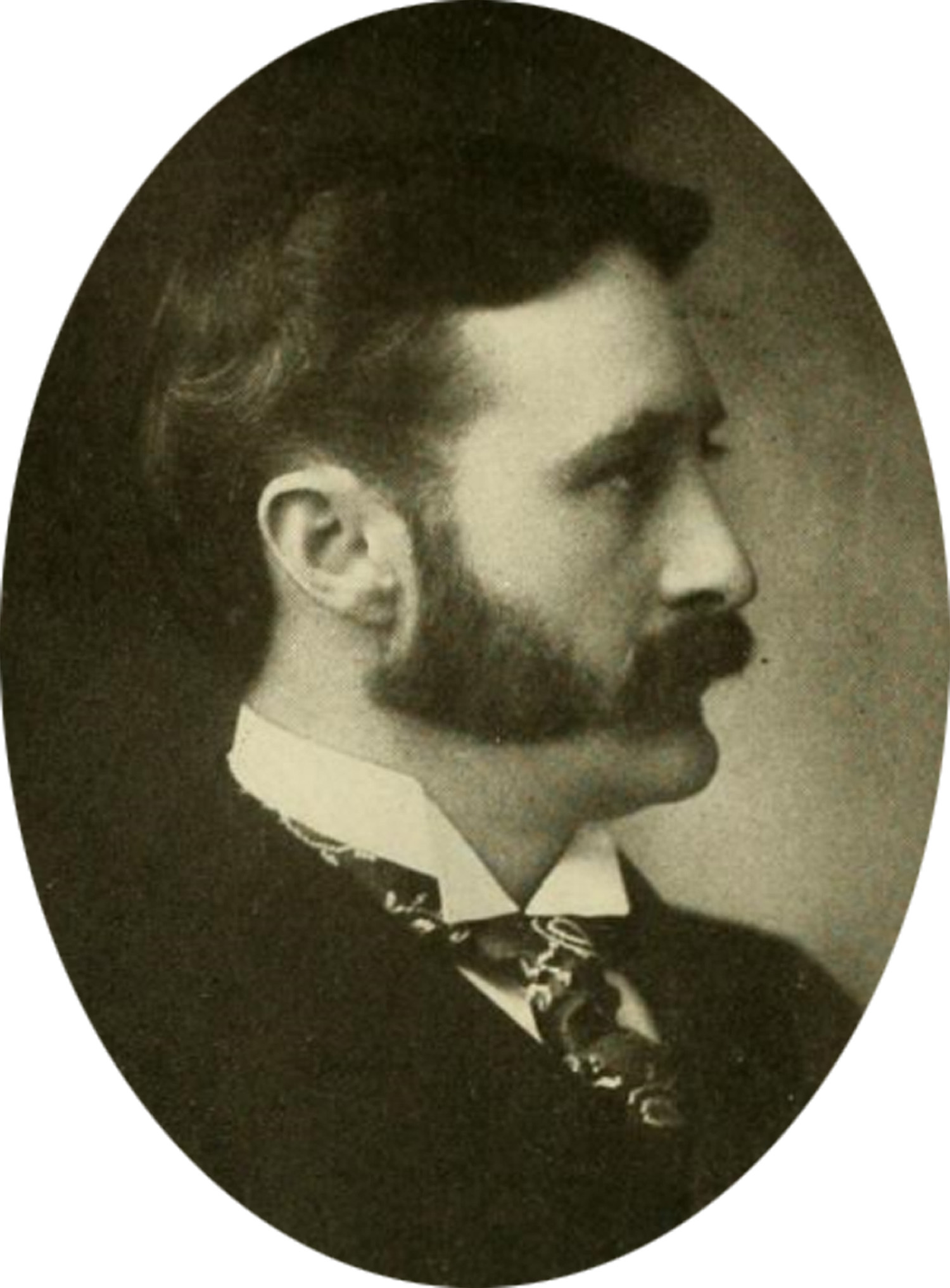
Harry Gordon Selfridge

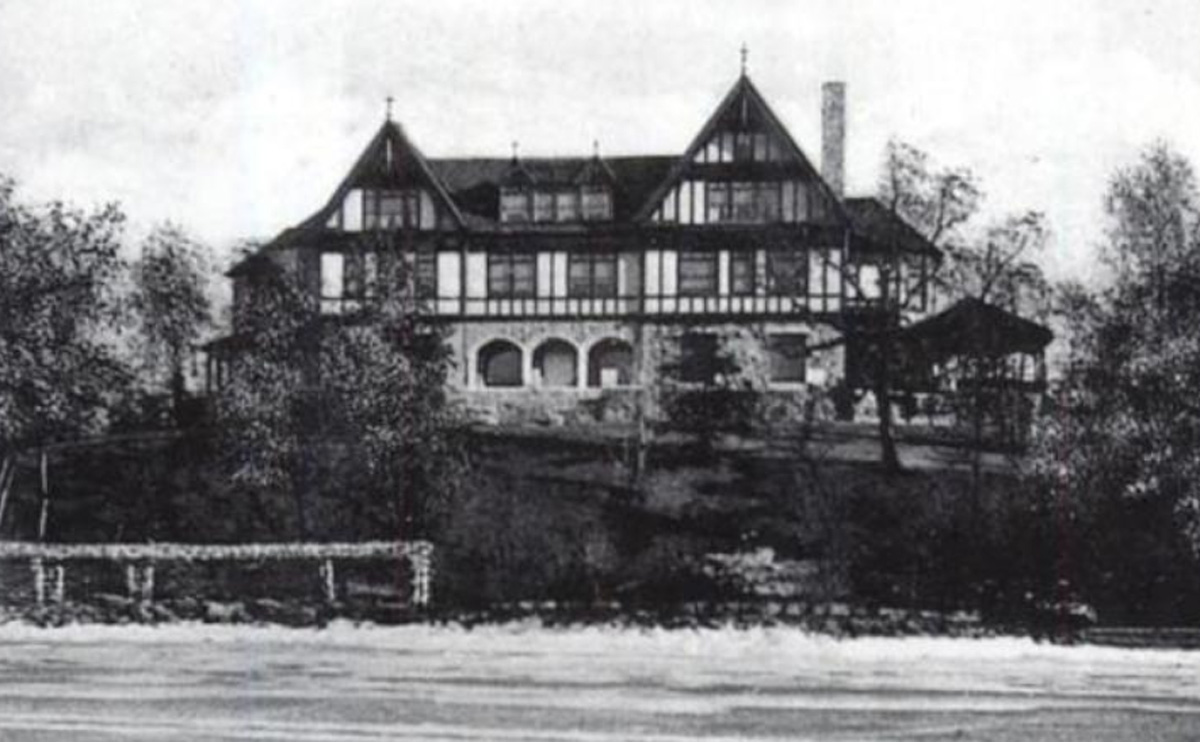
Harrose Hall, Lake Geneva, a second home of Harry and Rose Selfridge.

After their marriage, the couple lived for some time with Rose's mother on Rush Street, Chicago. They later moved to their own house on Lake Shore Drive. The Selfridges also built an imposing mansion called Harrose Hall in mock Tudor style on Lake Geneva, complete with large greenhouses and extensive rose gardens. Over the next decade the couple had five children – Chandler born in 1891, who died shortly thereafter, Rosalie born in 1893, Violette in 1897, Gordon in 1900 and Beatrice in 1901. Throughout their married life Harry's mother, Lois, lived with the family.

Rose was particularly fond of growing orchids and was said to be an expert in this field. The Chicago Tribune in 1903 said that she had 2000 different varieties and lauded her accomplishment as an orchidist. The couple held large parties and were frequently mentioned in the social pages of the Chicago newspapers.

In 1904, Harry opened his own department store called Harry G. Selfridge and Co. in Chicago. However, after only two months he sold the store at a profit to Carson, Pirie and Co. He then decided to retire and for the next two years pottered around his properties, mainly his mansion, Harrose Hall on Lake Geneva. He also bought a steam yacht, which he rarely used, and played golf. However, he soon became bored and began to plan the opening of a department store in London.

Rose was a member of the Daughters of the American Revolution, the Alliance française, the Fortnightly of Chicago and the Colonial Dames. Because of her interest in French culture, the French government conferred her into the Order of the Golden Palms.

== Life in the United Kingdom ==
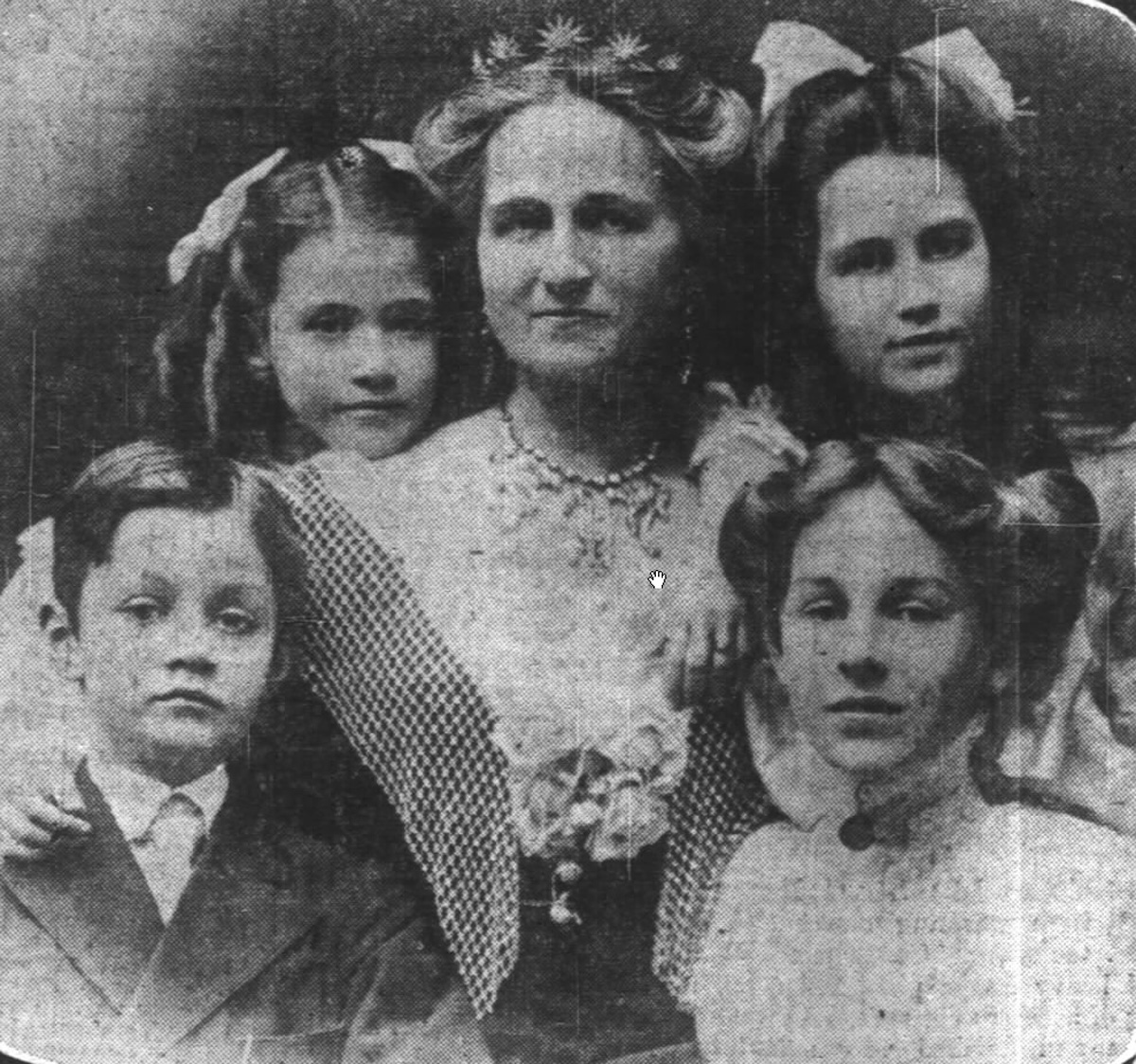
Rose Selfridge and her children. Top row: Beatrice, Rose (in centre) and Violette. Bottom Row: Gordon and Rosalie.

Harry went to London in 1906 without his family to make the preliminary arrangements for the new store. Rose and the four children followed later. They lived a very palatial lifestyle. The 1911 UK census shows that the family lived in a very large house in Arlington Street London with eleven servants. There was a cook, a kitchen maid, four housemaids, a scullery maid and three footmen. Harry appeared to want to lead the life of a traditional British gentleman.

Rose attended numerous social functions, many with the English aristocracy, while she lived in London either accompanied by Harry or alone. The Times in 1910 reported that "Viscount Bridport, the Duchess of Devonshire, Earl Howe, Lord Ornathwaite, Lady Russell and Mrs. Gordon Selfridge were among the many present yesterday at the musical and dramatic matinee given at the Criterion Theatre. The couple together also saw Anna Pavlova dance with her partner Michael Mordkin at a special private performance.

In 1911, the family was involved in a serious car accident near Ambleside in the Lake District. An account was given in a newspaper as follows:

The party were touring the Cumbrian Mountains and were not far from the head of Lake Windermere. Their car was descending Kirkstone Pass when the brakes failed and it ran away, swerving finally from the road and plunging with great force into the side of a house. The car was smashed and its occupants roughly thrown to the ground. Selfridge was badly cut and sustained a concussion of the brain being rendered insensible. He did not regain consciousness until this morning. Mrs. Selfridge was cut about the face and two bones in her forearm were broken. The senior Mrs. Selfridge (Lois) and Miss Selfridge (Rosalie junior) were badly bruised.

Rose did not greatly enjoy her life in London. She missed her home and family in Chicago and returned there to see her sister Anna three or four times a year. Her daughters, Rosalie, Violette, and Beatrice, attended Miss Douglas's School in Queen's Gate and learned to dance and speak French. Their son Gordon was sent away to prep school. Later, young Rosalie went to Finch College in New York City.

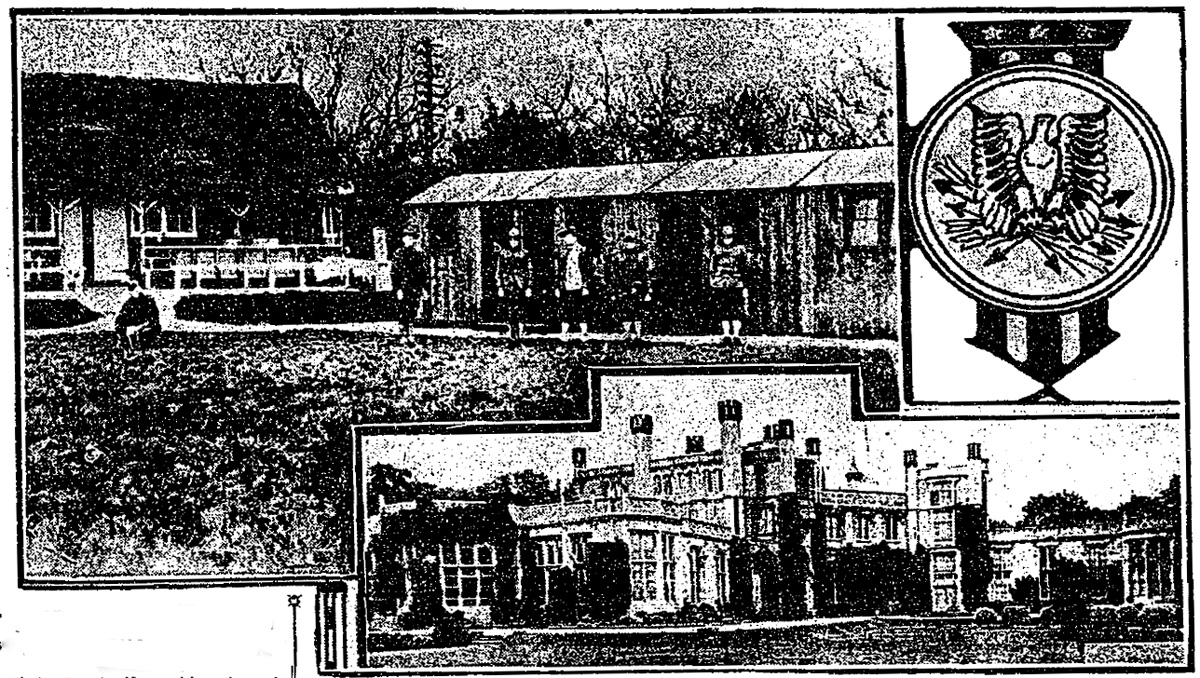
Rose's Convalescent Hospital at Highcliffe Castle.

In 1916 during World War I, Harry rented Highcliffe Castle as his country estate. He immediately made major improvements to the house. Rose and her two eldest daughters joined the Red Cross and for some time worked at nearby Christchurch Hospital. After the U.S. joined the war, Rose opened a convalescent hospital for American soldiers. Hayden Church, a reporter from the U.S., visited her at Highcliffe in 1918 and made a detailed report in his newspaper. It appears that Rose was very enthusiastic about her hospital, as the report states that "the Christmas gift of this American business man (Harry) to his wife was a perfectly equipped convalescent camp." It was described in the following terms:

The former cricket pavilion with thatched roof that must be over a century in age has been transformed into an office for the commandant and into a kitchen and cheerful dining room, in which the convalescent 'Sammies' take their meals. The huts in which they live number 12, with quarters for two men in each, and each of these huts whose open side is protected against the elements by a thick rubber curtain, which is mounted on an axis in such a way so that it may always face the sun. Then there is a recreation hut provided with a gramophone, games, books, maps, writing material and other things to make the men who use it comfortable. Lastly, there is another building known as the 'Medical Ward,' which provides quarters for the permanent American non-commissioned officer who is responsible for the discipline of the camp and which also houses the linen room and the men's bathroom.

In May 1918, Rose suddenly contracted pneumonia during the Spanish flu pandemic and died. Her funeral was conducted at the nearby St. Mark's Church at Highcliffe, and she was buried in the church cemetery. In her honor, Harry continued the work at the convalescent camp.

== Television ==
In the 2013 British period television drama series about Harry Gordon Selfridge and his London department store Selfridge & Co, the role of Rose Selfridge is portrayed by Frances O'Connor. The first episode of the third series commences with the occasion of Rose's funeral, with Harry questioning how he is meant to continue without his beloved wife.
