= Selfridges flagship store =

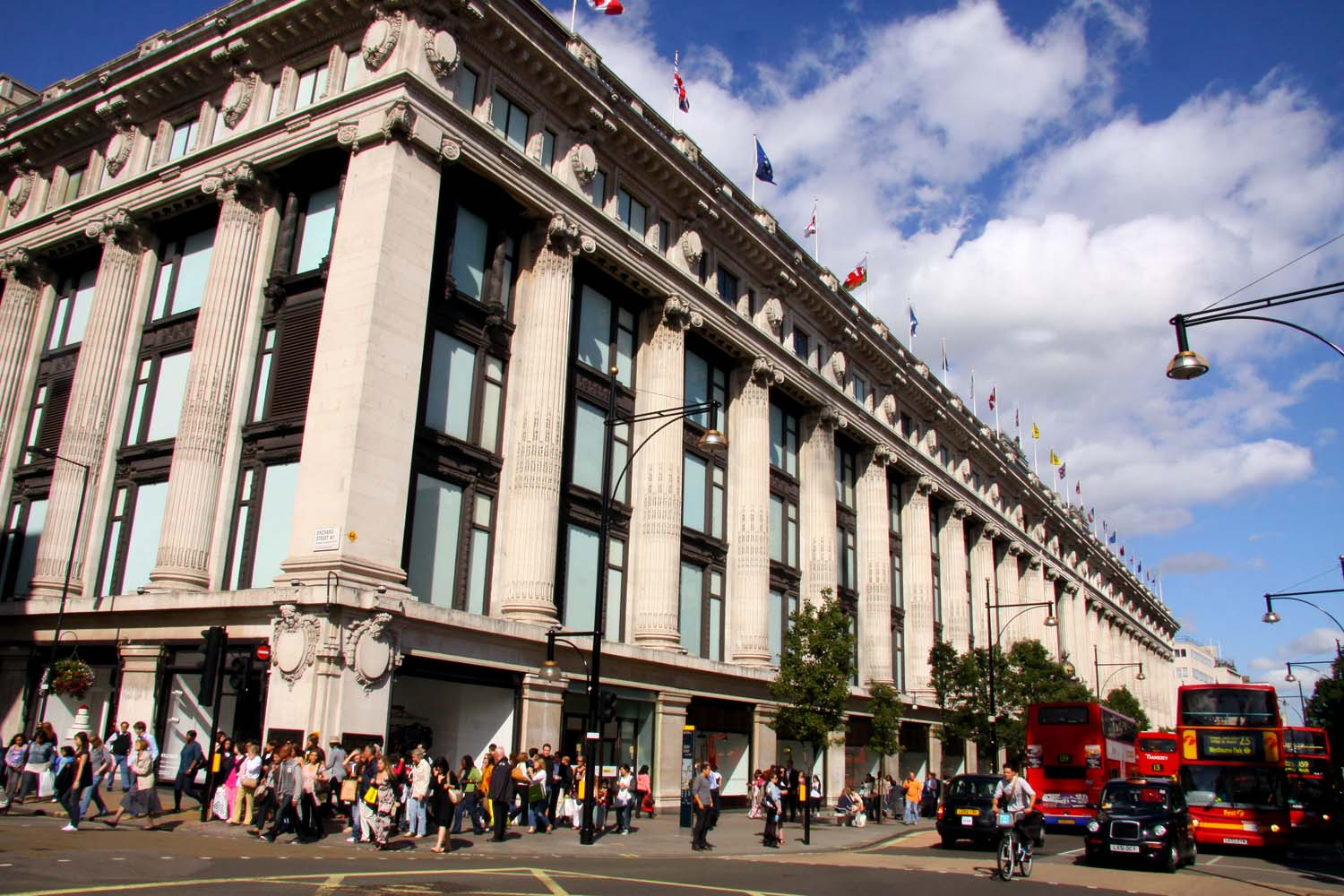
- Exterior of Selfridges flagship store (2010)
- Interactive map of Selfridges flagship store

General information
- Status: Open
- Type: Department store
- Architectural style: Beaux-Arts with Ionic columns
- Location: 400 Oxford Street, Marylebone, London, England
- Coordinates: 51°30′51.04″N 0°9′9.46″W
- Current tenants: Selfridges
- Opened: 15 March 1909; 116 years ago
- Cost: £400,000
- Client: Harry Gordon Selfridge
- Owner: Selfridges Group

Technical details
- Structural system: Steel frame
- Floor count: 9 (Note: Floor count includes five above-ground floors of selling space, one basement level of selling space, two basement levels of storage, and one roof terrace.)
- Floor area: 540,000 square feet (50,000 m^{2}) of selling space

Design and construction
- Architect: Daniel Burnham
- Structural engineer: Sven Bylander
- Other designers: Francis Swales; R. Frank Atkinson; Thomas Smith Tait; Gilbert Bayes

Website
- Store information

Listed Building – Grade II*
- Designated: 5 February 1970
- Reference no.: 1357436

The Selfridges flagship store is a Grade II listed department store on Oxford Street in Marylebone, London, England, and is also the headquarters of the Selfridges department store chain. It was designed by Daniel Burnham for Harry Gordon Selfridge, and opened in 1909. The store spans 540,000 square feet (50,000 m^{2}) of selling space, making it the second-largest department store in the United Kingdom, after Harrods. It was named the world's best department store in 2010, and again in 2012.

== Background ==
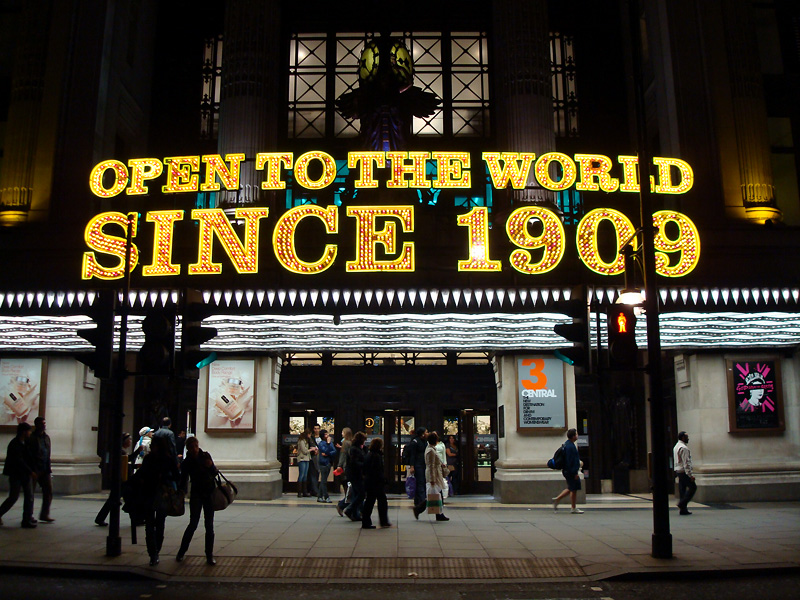
Entrance to Selfridges department store

In 1906, Harry Gordon Selfridge travelled to England on holiday with his wife, Rose. Selfridge had made his fortune as an executive for the Marshall Field's department store in Chicago. Unimpressed with the quality of existing British retailers, he noted that London's large stores had not adopted the latest selling ideas used in the United States. Determined to create something new, he invested the then-staggering sum of £400,000 to build his own department store. To secure the desired site, he gradually acquired a series of Georgian buildings located on the block bounded by Somerset, Wigmore, Orchard, and Duke Streets—an area that was, at the time, considered an unfashionable end of Oxford Street.

When Selfridges opened in 1909, it introduced several features that framed shopping as a form of leisure rather than solely a commercial activity. Among the facilities added at different times were a library, reading and writing rooms, and a designated "silence room". These were intended to extend the duration of visits while also broadening the store's functions beyond retail. The expansion of department stores during this period paralleled wider social changes, particularly the greater independence of women, who were increasingly able to shop without a chaperone. Department stores consequently became venues where women could spend time outside the home, engage in social activity, and encounter goods that represented contemporary ideas of taste and luxury.

== Design and construction ==
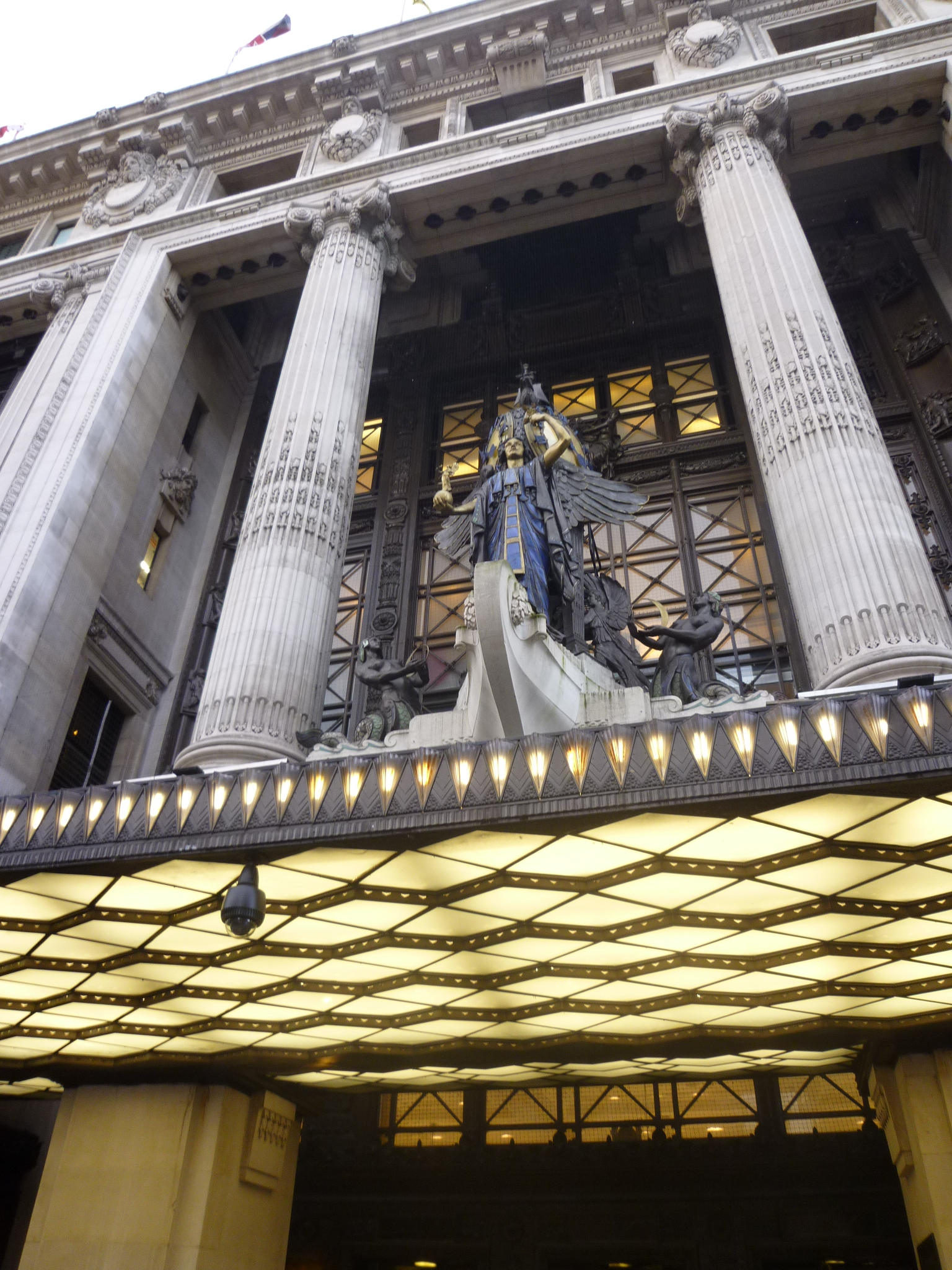
Art Nouveau features on the exterior of Selfridges on Oxford Street, London

Selfridges department store was designed by American architect and urban planner Daniel Burnham, a classical Beaux-Arts proponent combined with modern building technique, who was also respected for his department store designs. He created Marshall Field's, Chicago, Filene's in Boston, Wanamaker in Philadelphia, and Gimbels and Wanamaker's in New York City. The building was an early example in the UK of the use of a steel frame, five storeys high with three basement levels and a roof terrace, originally laid out to accommodate 100 departments.

American-trained Swedish structural engineer Sven Bylander was engaged to build the structure's steel frame. As the building was one of the early examples of steel frame in the UK, Bylander had to first agree to appropriate building regulations with the London County Council, requiring amendments to the London Building Act 1844. Using as a basis the regulations which covered the similarly-designed London docklands warehouses, Bylander then agreed changes which enabled greater spans within lesser beam dimensions due to the use of steel over stone. Bylander designed the entire supporting structure which was approved by the LCC in 1907, with a steel frame based on blue brick pile foundations, supporting a steel frame which holds all of the internal walls and the concrete floors. Bylander designed in additional supported internal walls, as LCC would not approve store areas above 450,000 cubic foot (13,000 m^{3}) due to the then approved fire safety regulations, many of which were removed 20 years later in light of new legislation. Bylander submitted a 13-page fully illustrated account of the design of the building to Concrete and Constructional Engineering, which was published in 1909. The work of Burnham and Bylander with LCC led to the passing of the LCC (General Powers) Act 1909, also called the Steel Frame Act, which gave the council the power to regulate the construction of reinforced concrete structures.

American architect Francis Swales, who trained at the École Nationale Supérieure des Beaux-Arts in Paris, was briefed to design the frontispiece. Aided by British architects R. Frank Atkinson and Thomas Smith Tait, the final design was highly influenced by John Burnet's 1904 extension to the British Museum. The steel supporting columns are hidden behind Ionic columns, to create a facade which presents a visually uniform, classical, Beaux-Arts appearance. The distinctive polychrome sculpture above the Oxford Street entrance is the work of British sculptor Gilbert Bayes. The final frontage, through use of cast iron window frames to a maximum size of 19 feet 4 inches (5.89 m) by 12 feet 0 inches (3.66 m), means that both the Oxford Street and Duke Street frontages are made up of more glass than stone or iron works.

=== Construction ===
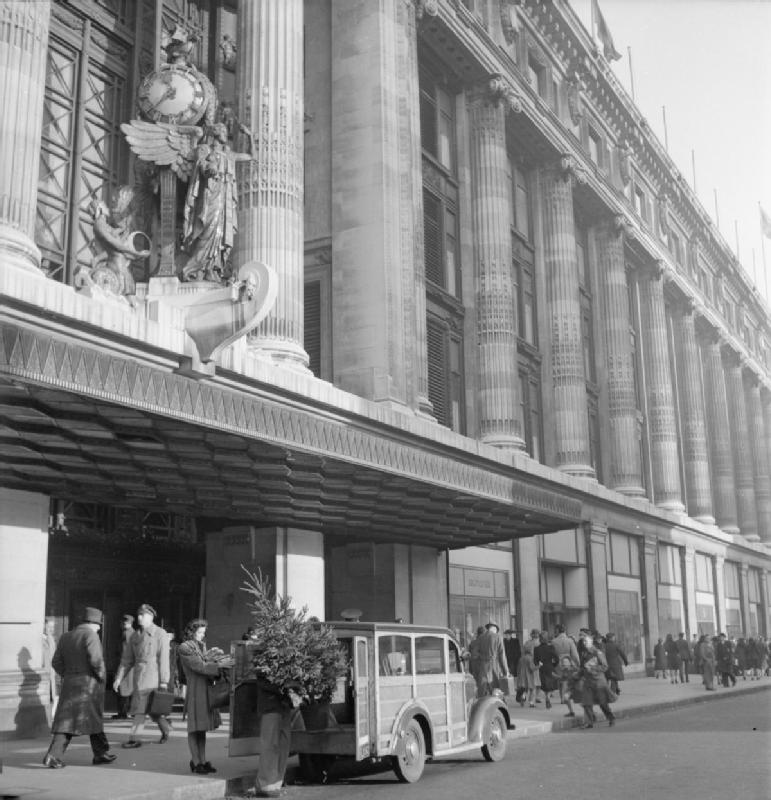
Selfridges at Christmas, 1944

Opened on 15 March 1909, the store was built in phases. The first phase consisted of the nine-and-a-half bays closest to the Duke Street corner, a site of 250 feet (76 m) wide on Oxford Street by 175 feet (53 m) along Duke Street. The floor heights averaged 15 feet (4.6 m), and the initial structure contained nine passenger lifts, two service lifts and six staircases.

The main entrance and all of the bays to its left were added some 18 years after the store first opened, using a modified construction system. The complete building opened fully in 1928, and resultantly through the use of supporting spandrel steel panels, the scale of the glass panes within the main entrance could be greatly enlarged.

A scheme to erect a massive tower above the store post-World War I was never carried out. Harry Selfridge also proposed a subway link to Bond Street station, and renaming it "Selfridges"; however, contemporary opposition quashed the idea.

The final design of the building completed in 1928, although classical in visible style and frontage, was thoroughly modern in its steel frame construction. In part due to new schools of architectural thought emerging apart from the classical schools, and in part due to the close proximity of World War I, the building was seen as the last of the great classical buildings undertaken within the UK. Although the UK was late in adopting modern architecture only from the 1930s onwards, by the mid-20th century many architects looked at Selfridges as if it were pre-historic in design, accepted just because Harry Gordon Selfridge wanted to advertise his business with a confident display of classicism in stone.

=== Basements ===
There are two levels of basement beneath the lower-ground shop floor: the 'sub' and the 'sub-sub'. Combined, these descend 60 metres (200 ft) below street level. These two areas are then split into two more areas: the dry sub and sub-sub, and their "wet" equivalents. The wet area is beneath the original nine-and-a-half bays closest to the Duke Street corner of the 1909 building. The "dry" is under the rear of the building, known as the SWOD after the surrounding four streets – Somerset, Wigmore, Orchard and Duke – that once enclosed it.

During World War II after the entry of the United States into the conflict, from 1942 the dry sub-sub SWOD was used by the United States Army. The building had one of the only secure telex lines, was safe from bombing, and was close to the US Embassy on Grosvenor Square. Initially used by U.S. General Dwight D. Eisenhower, the commander of SHAEF, it later housed 50 soldiers from the 805th Signal Service Company of the US Army Signal Corps, who installed a SIGSALY code-scrambling device connected to a similar terminal in the Pentagon building. The first conference took place on 15 July 1943. Initial visitors included Prime Minister Winston Churchill, to enable secure communications with the President of the United States, although later extensions were installed to both 10 Downing Street and the Cabinet War Rooms. Rumours persist of a tunnel built from Selfridges to the embassy so that personnel could move between the two in safety, with interrogation cells for prisoners hewn from the resultant uneven space available.

=== 2002 restoration ===
During restoration work in 2002, the scaffold was used to carry the largest photographic artwork ever produced, 60 feet (18 m) tall by 900 feet (270 m) long and weighing two tons. Created by Sam Taylor-Wood, it showed a gathering of well-known pop and cultural figures of the time, including Sir Elton John.

== Operations ==
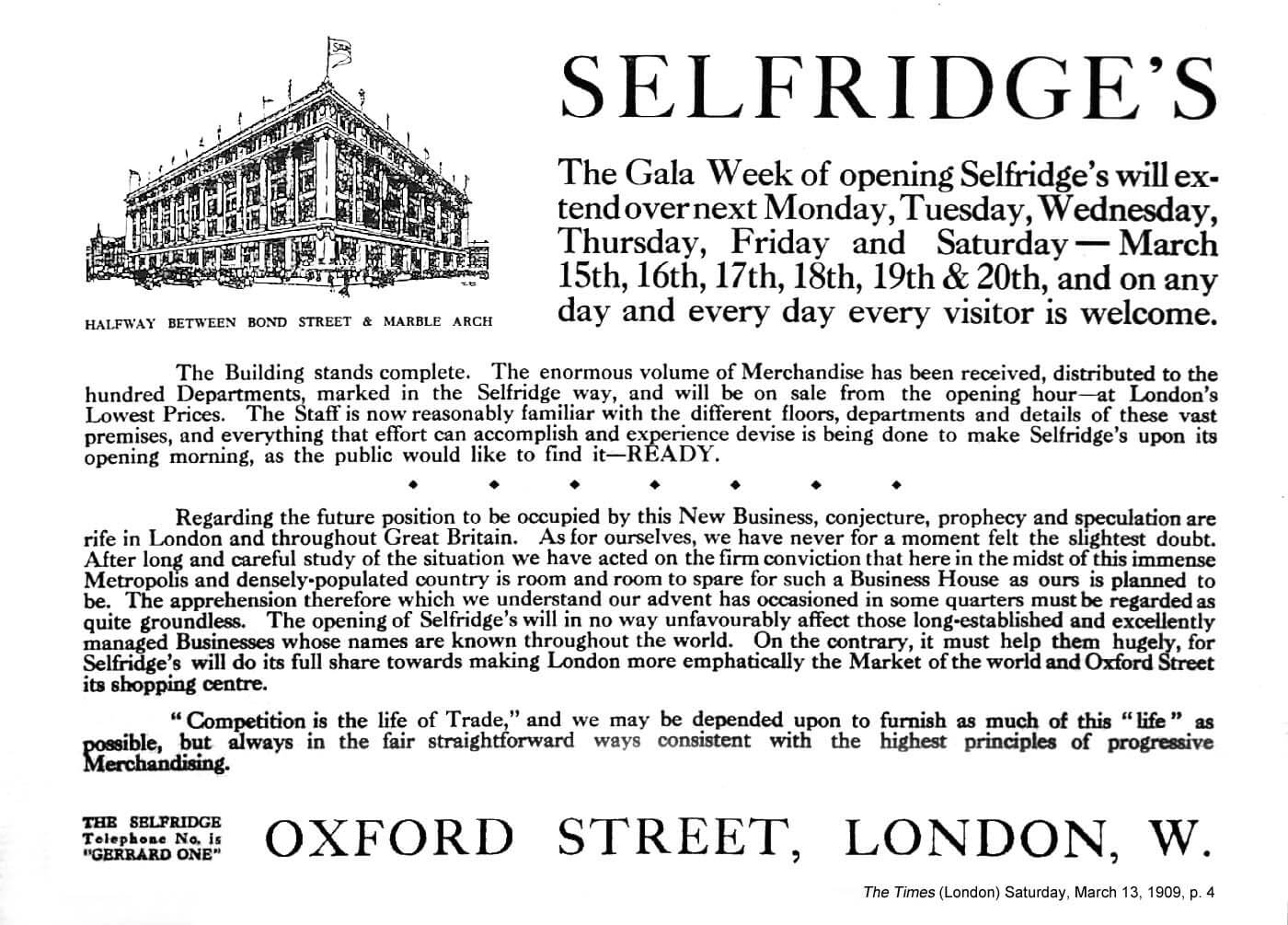
Two days before opening, an ad in The Times assured readers that the "apprehension...occasioned in some quarters" was unfounded, and that Selfridge's would provide competition in "fair straightforward ways consistent with the highest principles of progressive Merchandising".

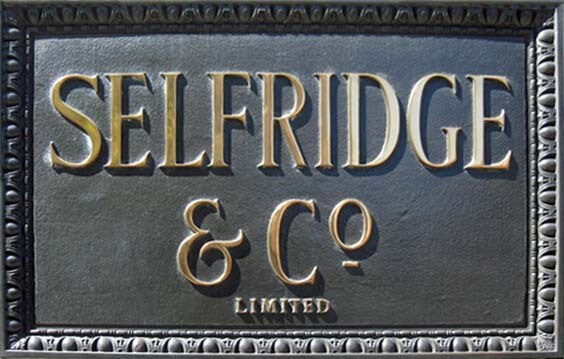
Selfridges nameboard

The new store opened to the public on 15 March 1909, employing 1,400 staff, setting new standards for the retailing business.

At that time, women were beginning to enjoy the fruits of emancipation by wandering unescorted around London. A canny marketer, Selfridge promoted the radical notion of shopping for pleasure rather than necessity. The store was extensively promoted through paid advertising. The shop floors were structured so that goods could be made more accessible to customers. There were elegant restaurants with modest prices, a library, reading and writing rooms, special reception rooms for French, German, American and "Colonial" customers, a First Aid Room, and a Silence Room, with soft lights, deep chairs, and double-glazing, all intended to keep customers in the store as long as possible. Staff members were taught to be on hand to assist customers, but not too aggressively, and to sell the merchandise. Oliver Lyttleton observed that, when one called on Selfridge, he would have nothing on his desk except one's letter, smoothed and ironed.

Selfridge also managed to obtain from the GPO the privilege of having the number "1" as its own phone number, so anybody had to just dial 1 to be connected to Selfridge's operators.

The roof terrace hosted terraced gardens, cafes, a mini golf course and an all-girl gun club. The roof, with its views across London, was a common place for strolling after a shopping trip and was often used for fashion shows. As with much of central London during World War II, Selfridges suffered serious damage on a number of occasions during the 57 nights of the London Blitz from 7 September 1940, and in 1941 and 1944. After the heavy bombing of the West End on 17/18 September 1940 by a combined force of 268 Heinkel He 111 and Dornier Do 17 bombers – after which the store's Art Deco lifts were out of service until post-WW2, and the signature window was shattered – Harry had the ground floor windows bricked-up. The roof terrace reopened again for the first time since in July 2011, for a promotional event staged by Truvia as part of their UK launch. In Summer 2012, Bompas & Parr designed an art installation themed as "The Big British Tea Party", which included a cake-themed 9-hole crazy golf course, accompanied by a Daylesford Organic sponsored tea house.

The bomb on 17 April 1941 destroyed only the Palm Court Restaurant, venue for the rich and famous. However, at 11 pm on 6 December 1944, a V-2 rocket hit the Red Lion pub on the corner of Duke Street and Barrett Street. A canteen in the SWOD basement area (see above) was massively damaged, with eight American servicemen killed and 32 injured, as well as ten civilian deaths and seven injuries. In the main building, ruptured water mains threatened SIGSALY, and while the Food Hall was the only department that did not need cleaning, Selfridges' shop-front Christmas tree displays were blown into Oxford Street. By 2010, only three of the four major pre–World War II Oxford Street retailers—Selfridges, House of Fraser and John Lewis—survive in retail, while Bourne & Hollingsworth and Peter Robinson (acquired in 1946 by Burton's), are no longer trading. Selfridges is the only retailer still trading in the same building, which still bears the scars of war damage, while John Lewis has moved. Bourne & Hollingsworth was located in the now closed Plaza Shopping Centre at No 120, while Peter Robinson is now Niketown at No 200–236.

A Milne-Shaw seismograph was set up on the third floor in 1932, attached to one of the building's main stanchions, unaffected by traffic or shoppers. It recorded the Belgian earthquake of 11 June 1938 which was also felt in London. At the outbreak of war, the seismograph was moved from its original site near the Post Office to another part of the store. In 1947, the seismograph was given to the British Museum.

Parts of Selfridges were damaged in the Oxford Street bombing in 1974 committed by the Provisional Irish Republican Army. The IRA planted other bombs too – on 21 February 1976 inside the store, injuring five people; just outside the store on Oxford Street on 28 August 1975, injuring seven; and inside the store on 29 January 1977, setting the building ablaze and causing an injury.

In 2002, Selfridges was awarded the London Tourism Award for visitors' favourite London store. Selfridges was named world's best department store in 2010, and again in 2012. It claims to contain the UK's largest beauty department, and Europe's busiest doorway which siphons 250,000 people a week past the Louis Vuitton concession on to Oxford Street.

=== Windows ===
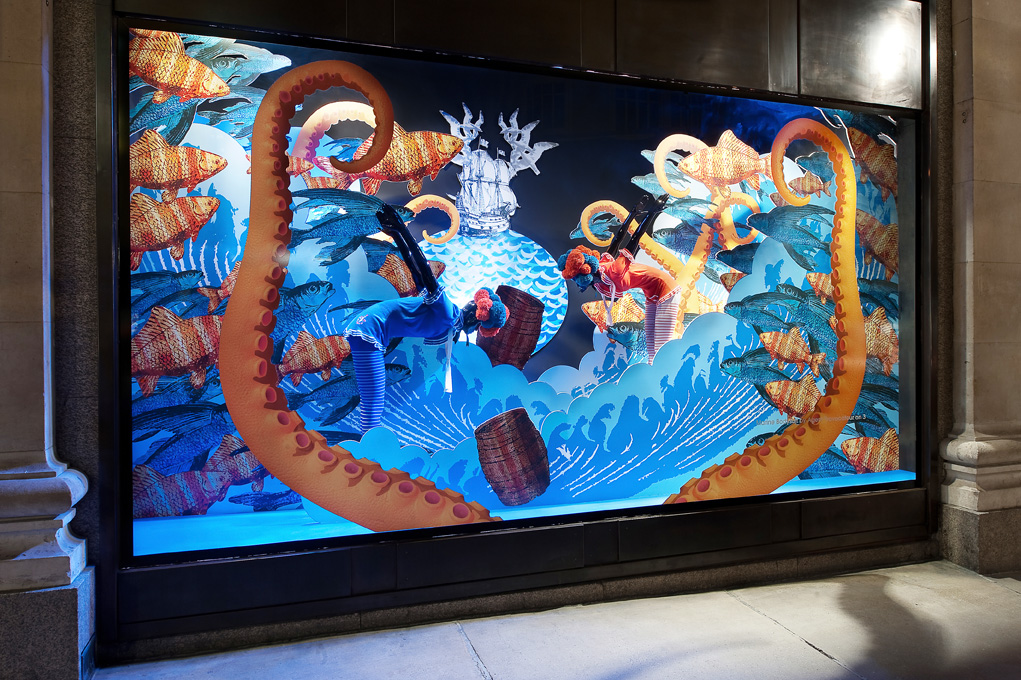
Selfridges window display, 2009

Selfridges' 27 Oxford Street windows have become synonymous with the brand, and to a certain degree have become as famous as the store and the Oxford Street location itself. The windows consistently attract tourists, designers and fashionistas alike to marvel at the current designs and styling and fashion trends.

Selfridges has a history of bold art initiatives when it comes to the window designs. When the building opened, Harry Selfridge initiated a "signature" window which was signed by all of the stars and famous people who came to shop at the store. This was cracked in the first bombing during the blitz, and was never restored.

Today, the visual merchandising team calculate that 20% of business-winning trade is from the windows. When Alannah Weston became Creative Director after the purchase by her family in 2003, she approached artist Alison Jackson to put her trademark Tony Blair and David Beckham lookalikes in the windows. The resultant display brought traffic to a standstill, with the Metropolitan Police finally insisting they stop the project because it was clogging up Oxford Street.

Since 2002, the windows have been photographed by London photographer Andrew Meredith and published in magazines such as Vogue, Dwell, Icon, Frame Magazine, Creative Review, Hungarian Stylus Magazine, Design Week, Harper's Bazaar, New York Times, WGSN and much more including worldwide press, journals, blogs and published books all over the world.

== Ownership ==
In 1941, Selfridge retired. In 1951 the store was acquired by the Liverpool-based Lewis's chain of department stores, which was in turn taken over in 1965 by the Sears Group owned by Charles Clore. Expanded under the Sears group to include branches in Oxford, Manchester and Birmingham, in 2003 the chain was acquired by Canada's Galen Weston for £598 million.

== Expansion ==
In 2011, the Weston family bought 388–396 Oxford Street, which is located immediately to the east of the Selfridges building across Duke Street, on which fashion chain French Connection has a lease until 2025.

In early 2012, Selfridges commissioned Italian architect Renzo Piano (responsible for London's The Shard skyscraper), to work on an extension to the 1909 department store. The project could feature a hotel as well as office space, or additional retail space.

In December 2012, Selfridges acquired the 100,000 square feet (9,300 m^{2}) Nations House office building from Hermes, which is located immediately behind its Oxford Street store in Wigmore Street, for around £130m.
