= Lindy Woodhead =

British writer

Lindy Woodhead (born 1950) is a British writer and biographer, best known for her book Shopping, Seduction & Mr Selfridge, which was adapted into the ITV drama Mr Selfridge.

== Life and career ==
Woodhead turned to writing biographies in 2000 when she turned 50 after a long career as a journalist and as a publicist in the film and fashion industry and running her own public relations company.

Her first book, published in 2003, was War Paint and is a dual biography of make-up pioneers Elizabeth Arden and Helena Rubinstein and their professional rivalry. The book was adapted into a Broadway musical.

Her next book, about Harry Selfridge, came in 2012 and was adapted by screenwriter Andrew Davies into four series of Mr Selfridge for ITV. Davies admitted that when he was sent Woodhead's book as a possible project to adapt, he couldn't see the television appeal of shopping. But he changed his mind once he'd read it.

== Books ==
- War Paint: Elizabeth Arden and Helena Rubinstein: Their Lives, Their Times, Their Rivalry (2003, Orion ISBN 9781474606509)
- Shopping, Seduction & Mr Selfridge (2012, Profile, ISBN 9781847659644)
- Midnight Mother: Mrs Meyrick - the Most Notorious Nightclub Owner in 1920s London (2014, Penguin Random House, ISBN 9780091954000)
