= Mr Selfridge =

Television series

- Genre: Period drama
- Created by: Andrew Davies
- Based on: Shopping, Seduction & Mr Selfridge by Lindy Woodhead
- Starring: Jeremy Piven; Amanda Abbington; Ron Cook; Grégory Fitoussi; Tom Goodman-Hill; Trystan Gravelle; Amy Beth Hayes; Katherine Kelly; Aisling Loftus; Kika Markham; Aidan McArdle; Frances O'Connor; Zoë Tapper; Hannah Tointon; Kara Tointon; Polly Walker; Zoë Wanamaker; Samuel West
- Composer: Charlie Mole
- Country of origin: United Kingdom
- Original language: English
- No. of series: 4
- No. of episodes: 40

Production
- Executive producers: Kate Lewis; Andrew Davies; Rebecca Eaton
- Producers: Chrissy Skins; Jeremy Piven
- Running time: Episode 1: 63 minutes Episodes 2–40: 44–46 minutes
- Production companies: ITV Studios; Masterpiece

Original release
- Network: ITV
- Release: 6 January 2013 – 11 March 2016

Mr Selfridge is a British period drama television series about Harry Gordon Selfridge and his department store, Selfridge & Co, in London, set from 1908 to 1929. It was co-produced by ITV Studios and Masterpiece/WGBH for broadcast on ITV. The series began broadcasting on ITV on 6 January 2013 and 30 March 2016 on PBS in the United States.

In the series, Selfridge has successfully modernized the department store Marshall Field's in Chicago before deciding to open the finest department store in the world in London's Oxford Street. The socialite Lady Mae Loxley is among his first allies. The series depicts a number of historical figures who have interactions with Selfridge or his staff over the following decades, including (among others) the French aviator Louis Blériot, the Russian ballerina Anna Pavlova, the detective fiction writer and spiritualist Arthur Conan Doyle, the Anglo-Irish explorer Ernest Shackleton, and the British monarch Edward VII. By the end of the series in the late 1920s, Selfridge is forced to step down from his leadership position after acquiring the store William Whiteley Limited and unwittingly inheriting its debts to unpaid suppliers.

== Production ==
=== Development and production ===
It was announced on 24 May 2011 that ITV was in discussions with ITV Studios about developing an adaptation of Lindy Woodhead's biography Shopping, Seduction & Mr Selfridge. Andrew Davies was confirmed to be working on the script. Beginning in London in 1908, during a time period when women were enjoying an ever-increasing amount of freedom, it tells the story of Harry Gordon Selfridge, the founder of Selfridges department store and includes members of his family, particularly his wife Rose Selfridge.

It was originally planned to be screened in late 2012, and it is claimed that ITV was forced to postpone airing the drama to January 2013 due to rival BBC airing a similarly themed drama series The Paradise which was broadcast on 25 September 2012.

A set to the north of London was built to house a replica of the 1909 Selfridge's store interior. The exterior of the store was recreated in The Historic Dockyard Chatham, in Kent.

The disused Aldwych tube station was used to film Rose Selfridge travelling on the London Underground and scenes in the first episode.

On 8 February 2013, ITV announced Mr Selfridge had been commissioned for a second series of ten episodes, to start on 19 January 2014. Anthony Byrne, who directed three episodes of series one, returned to direct some of the new episodes. On 22 July 2013, PBS also purchased a second series that aired in 2014 as part of its Masterpiece Classic. The second series is set in 1914 and portrays the consequence of World War I to the store and staff. On 21 February 2014, it was announced that Mr. Selfridge had been renewed for a third series, to air in 2015. On 13 March 2015, ITV announced Mr Selfridge had been commissioned for a new 10-part fourth and final series.

On 11 March 2016, Mr Selfridge aired its final episode after the conclusion of the fourth series and a total of 40 episodes were produced.

=== Casting ===
An American casting director was employed to find an actor suitable to play Harry Selfridge. Jeremy Piven's agent informed him of the role. Producer Chrissy Skinns and director Jon Jones met Piven in Los Angeles and were impressed by his understanding of the character. Executive producer Kate Lewis was "thrilled to attract" Frances O'Connor to the role of Rose Selfridge because she had long been a fan of the actress. Former Coronation Street actress Katherine Kelly signed up to play Lady Mae Loxley and returned for Series 2 and Series 4. The casting of the trio was announced in March 2012 alongside Grégory Fitoussi (Henri Leclair), Aisling Loftus (Agnes Towler), Zoe Tapper (Ellen Love) and Trystan Gravelle (Victor Colleano).

== Cast and characters ==
Actor	Character	Series			
Actor	Character	1	2	3	4
Selfridge Family
Jeremy Piven	Harry Gordon Selfridge	Main	Main	Main	Main
Frances O'Connor	Rose Selfridge	Main	Main		
Kika Markham	Lois Selfridge	Main	Recurring	Main	Main
Adam Wilson	Gordon Selfridge	Recurring			
Greg Austin	Gordon Selfridge		Recurring	Recurring	Main
Poppy Lee Friar	Rosalie Selfridge	Recurring	Recurring		
Kara Tointon	Rosalie Selfridge			Main	Main
Freya Wilson	Violette Selfridge	Recurring			
Millie Brady	Violette Selfridge		Recurring		
Hannah Tointon	Violette Selfridge			Main	Main
Raffey Cassidy	Beatrice Selfridge	Recurring			
Alana Boden	Beatrice Selfridge		Recurring	Guest	
Amy Morgan	Grace Calthorpe		Recurring	Main	Main
Zoë Wanamaker	Princess Marie Wiasemsky de Bolotoff			Main	
Leon Ockenden	Serge de Bolotoff			Main	
Selfridge Staff
Ron Cook	Arthur Crabb	Main	Main	Main	Main
Tom Goodman-Hill	Roger Grove	Main	Main	Main	Main
Amanda Abbington	Josie Mardle	Main	Main	Main	Main
Trystan Gravelle	Victor Colleano	Main	Main	Main	Main
Samuel West	Frank Edwards	Main	Main	Main	Main
Amy Beth Hayes	Kitty Hawkins	Recurring	Main	Main	Main
Calum Callaghan	George Towler	Recurring	Recurring	Main	Main
Deborah Cornelius	Miss Blenkinsop	Recurring	Recurring	Recurring	Recurring
Aisling Loftus	Agnes Towler	Main	Main	Main	
Grégory Fitoussi	Henri Leclair	Main	Main	Main	
Lauren Crace	Doris Millar	Recurring	Recurring	Recurring	
Anna Madeley	Irene Ravillious	Main			
Timothy Watson	Mr Perez	Recurring			
Pippa Haywood	Flora Bunting	Recurring			
Sadie Shimmin	Miss Plunkett		Recurring	Recurring	Recurring
Ria Zmitrowicz	Sarah Ellis		Recurring	Recurring	Recurring
Sai Bennett	Jessie Pertree		Recurring	Recurring	
Cal MacAninch	Mr Thackeray		Main	Guest	
Sean Teale	Franco Colleano		Recurring		
Sacha Parkinson	Connie Hawkins			Recurring	Main
Edward Akrout	Pierre Longchamp			Recurring	
Lottie Tolhurst	Meryl Grove				Recurring
Sam Swann	Freddy Lyons				Recurring
Mimi Ndiweni	Matilda Brockless				Recurring
Others
Katherine Kelly	Lady Mae Loxley	Main	Main		Main
Malcolm Rennie	Fraser	Recurring	Recurring	Recurring	Recurring
Wendy Nottingham	Mildred Crabb	Guest	Guest	Recurring	Recurring
Zoë Tapper	Ellen Love	Main			
Oliver Jackson-Cohen	Roderick Temple	Main			
Nick Moran	Reg Towler	Main			
Will Payne	Tony Travers	Recurring			
Aidan McArdle	Lord Loxley		Main	Main	
Raymond Coulthard	Lord Miles Edgerton		Recurring	Recurring	
Polly Walker	Delphine Day		Main		
Oliver Farnworth	Florian Dupont		Recurring		
Vincenzo Nicoli	Uncle Gio		Recurring		
Amanda Lawrence	Jane Pimble		Recurring		
Kelly Adams	Nancy Webb			Main	
Jolyon Coy	Augustus Paynton			Recurring	
Naomi Ryan	Elsa Simmons			Recurring	
Mitchell Hunt	Joe Tooby			Guest	Recurring
Robert Pugh	Lord Wynnstay				Main
Sacha Dhawan	Jimmy Dillon				Main
Emma Hamilton	Rosie Dolly				Recurring
Zoe Richards	Jenny Dolly				Recurring
Oliver Dimsdale	Mr Keen				Recurring
Sophie Holland	Flora			Guest	

== Series overview ==
Series	Episodes	Originally released		Average rating (millions)
Series	Episodes	First released	Last released	Average rating (millions)
1	10	6 January 2013	10 March 2013	7.99
2	10	19 January 2014	23 March 2014	8.09
3	10	25 January 2015	29 March 2015	7.32
4	10	8 January 2016	11 March 2016	3.49

== Shop staff ==
=== Accessories ===
- Josie Mardle (Series 1–4), Head of Department
- Grace Calthorpe (Series 2–3), Shop assistant / Head of Department
- Agnes Towler (Series 1), Senior shop assistant
- Doris Millar (Series 1), Shop assistant
- Kitty Hawkins (Series 1), Shop assistant

=== Beauty ===
- Kitty Hawkins (Series 2–4), Head of Department
- Jessie Pertree (Series 2–3), Shop assistant

=== Fashion ===
- Flora Bunting (Series 1), Head of Department
- Irene Ravilious (Series 1), Head of Department
- Mr Thackery (Series 2–3), Head of Department
- Josie Mardle (Series 3), Head of Department
- Connie Hawkins (Series 3–4), Shop assistant / Head of Department
- Agnes Towler (Series 1), Shop assistant
- Gordon Selfridge (Series 3), Shop assistant
- Meryl Grove (Series 4), Shop assistant

=== Loading Bay ===
- George Towler (Series 1–2), Assistant / Head of Department
- Gordon Selfridge (Series 2), Assistant
- Sam (Series 1), Assistant
- Alf (Series 1), Assistant
- Ed (Series 2), Assistant
- Dave (Series 2), Assistant
- Sarah Ellis (Series 2–3), Assistant

=== Offices ===
- Harry Selfridge (Series 1–4), General Manager
- Henri Leclair (Series 2–3), Deputy Manager
- Gordon Selfridge (Series 3–4), Deputy Manager / Provincial Stores Manager
- Roger Grove, (Series 1–4), Chief of Staff / Deputy Manager
- Josie Mardle (Series 4), Deputy Manager
- Arthur Crabb (Series 1–4), Finance
- Miss Blenkinsopp (Series 1–2), Secretary
- Miss Plunket (Series 2–4), Secretary

=== Design ===
- Henri Leclair (Series 1), Head of Display
- Agnes Towler (Series 2–3), Head of Display
- Pierre Longchamp (Series 3), Head of Display
- Freddy Lyons (Series 4), Head of Display

=== The Palm Court ===
- Mr Perez (Series 1), Head of Department
- Victor Colleano, (Series 1–2), Waiter / Head of Department
- Franco Colleano (Series 2), Waiter

=== Sewing Room ===
- Mae Rennard (Series 4), Designer
- Sarah Ellis (Series 4), Head of Department
- Matilda Brockless (Series 4), Machinist / Head of Department
- Prue (Series 4), Machinist
- Joyce (Series 4), Machinist

=== Other departments ===
- Gordon Selfridge (Series 2), Tea
- George Towler (Series 3–4), Head of Security
- Miss Blenkinsop (Series 3–4), Head of Information Bureau

== Episodes ==
=== Series 1 (2013) ===
(1908–1910)

No. overall	No. in series	Title	Directed by	Written by	Original release date	UK viewers (millions)
1	1	"Episode 1"	Jon Jones	Andrew Davies	6 January 2013	9.36 (Note: 7.699 million on ITV, 844,000 on the ITV HD simulcast, and 813,000 on ITV +1.)
March 1908 – March 1909 Flamboyant Harry Selfridge, after transforming Chicago's Marshall Field's into a modern department store, realises London needs a similar one. He decides to build the biggest and finest department store in the world at the "dead end" of Oxford Street, but his business partner pulls out of the project. Via a pressman he receives help from socialite Lady Mae Loxley and her contacts, one of whom invests. With his wife, four children and his mother arriving in London, Selfridge begins to assemble his staff as the building is completed in record time. Months after inadvertently getting Agnes Towler fired from Gamage's for "conduct unbecoming" (she let him behind the counter while he was looking to purchase a pair of gloves), he hires her for Selfridge's.
2	2	"Episode 2"	Jon Jones	Andrew Davies	13 January 2013	8.95 (Note: 7.383 million on ITV, 834,000 on the ITV HD simulcast, and 730,000 on ITV +1.)
An initial lack of customers forces Harry Selfridge to think of ways of attracting people to his new London department store. He persuades the first man to fly across the English Channel, French aviator Louis Blériot, to make a personal appearance along with the aircraft in which he made his historic flight. Meanwhile, Harry and music-hall artiste Ellen Love are caught in a compromising situation. His marriage comes under threat when Rose agrees to pose for young bohemian artist Roddy Temple. Agnes gets her brother George a job as a porter and abusive father Reg foists himself on them. A well-to-do customer propositions Victor Colleano in the store's restaurant.
3	3	"Episode 3"	John Strickland	Kate Brooke	20 January 2013	7.60 (Note: 6.19 million on ITV, 786,000 on the ITV HD simulcast, and 626,000 on ITV +1.)
Harry installs Ellen Love in an apartment. Watching her apply make-up, he decides to open a new cosmetics department at the front of the store, not hidden away, and tasks Henri Leclair to create a house perfume. Agnes – sporting a black eye from her violent father – is asked to assist in creating a perfume for ordinary women. Lady Mae helps Rosalie, Harry's eldest daughter, enter society and applies pressure on Harry over his personal affairs. Rose Selfridge learns of the apartment from Lady Mae.
4	4	"Episode 4"	John Strickland	Kate O'Riordan	27 January 2013	7.73 (Note: 6.97 million on ITV and ITV HD, and 760,000 on ITV +1.)
Miss Bunting is sacked for theft and Miss Ravillious is appointed the new head of fashion, ruffling a few feathers. Selfridge takes his wife and eldest daughter to see iconic dancer Anna Pavlova; she is invited to visit his store for a publicity event, and to take tea with his wife. Ellen Love, feeling neglected, arrives during the event and tries to share the limelight with Pavlova but is made to leave. Agnes' drunken father makes a scene at the event. Roddy and his bohemian friends delay Rose Selfridge with the result that she misses the tea altogether.
5	5	"Episode 5"	Anthony Byrne	Kate Brooke	3 February 2013	7.76 (Note: 6.27 million on ITV, 747,000 on the ITV HD simulcast, and 744,000 on ITV +1.)
Agnes has resigned following her father's drunken antics at the store. Selfridge goes to her home to mend matters; she is reinstated and he confronts her father. Selfridge becomes disturbed by memories of his own abusive father. Ellen Love decides to visit Rose to reveal the affair. Selfridge discovers the painting of his wife and wonders about her relationship with the artist, Roddy. Theft in the loading bay where George works is discovered. Henri Leclair is pleased Agnes has returned; she falls out with Victor, who is beginning to ingratiate himself with Lady Mae. Selfridge and his wife finally confront one another; he flees to his club and a showdown with Ellen Love. Overwhelmed with sorrow, Selfridge crashes his car while drunk.
6	6	"Episode 6"	Anthony Byrne	Kate Brooke	10 February 2013	7.79 (Note: 6.658 million on ITV, 727,000 on the ITV HD simulcast, and 407,000 on ITV +1.)
Selfridge is in a coma from the car crash. Ellen Love is recovering from a botched suicide attempt by drug overdose. Mr Grove – recently bereaved – returns from leave to take charge and his first decision is to ban Lady Mae's suffragettes from meeting in the store. Lady Mae has begun an affair with Victor and he is cold to Agnes; Henri Leclair would like to become her suitor. Selfridge's young son Gordon goes alone to the store, learning he alone will inherit it someday. Ellen thinks about selling her story to the press but is forestalled by an offer from Frank Edwards. The staff must appease the angry suffragettes.
7	7	"Episode 7"	Anthony Byrne	Kate O'Riordan	17 February 2013	7.88 (Note: 6.57 million on ITV, 654,000 on the ITV HD simulcast, and 654,000 on ITV +1.)
Selfridge welcomes author and spiritualist Sir Arthur Conan Doyle (John Sessions) to a Sherlock Holmes book signing and Selfridge agrees to his request to hold a séance in the store. The séance raises the hopes of Miss Mardle but upsets Lois Selfridge. Doris takes pity on Miss Bunting whose sacking has landed her in poverty. Kitty has a secret admirer – but not the one she hoped for. Agnes transfers from accessories to women's fashion. Lady Mae helps Selfridge win over the bankers in order to make a share issue; she also chaperones Rosalie Selfridge into high society.
8	8	"Episode 8"	Michael Keillor	Kate Brooke	24 February 2013	7.71 (Note: 6.26 million on ITV, 712,000 on the ITV HD simulcast, and 742,000 on ITV +1.)
Selfridge's old family friend Frank Winfield Woolworth (Michael Brandon) and his wife arrive in London to open a "pile 'em high, sell 'em cheap" store in competition and Selfridge decides to counter with a mid-season sale in every department. Lady Mae proposes suitors for Rosalie and the Selfridges attend one of her soirées at which Roddy is also a guest. Kitty and Doris are rivals for the position of senior assistant subject to interview by Mr Grove. Selfridge refuses to write a reference for Miss Bunting. Agnes has supper with Henri Leclair. Victor's dream of his own restaurant diminishes with Lady Mae's lack of interest. Roddy's attention is proving a nuisance to Rose Selfridge.
9	9	"Episode 9"	Michael Keillor	Kate O'Riordan	3 March 2013	7.40 (Note: 5.97 million on ITV, 695,000 on the ITV HD simulcast, and 736,000 on ITV +1.)
Selfridge invites Antarctic explorer Ernest Shackleton (Mark Dexter) to give a lecture in the store. The staff are late arriving for work due to a body on the Underground track and Selfridge is shocked to discover he might be responsible. Frank Edwards loses his job and seeks employment from Selfridge, but is denied it. Roddy Temple's attention to Rosalie results in Harry confronting him. Miss Ravillious discovers the affair between Agnes and Leclair just as his old flame, Valerie Maurel (Joséphine de La Baume), returns with a job offer from New York. Doris Miller takes tea with Mr Grove to remember Miss Bunting.
10	10	"Episode 10"	Michael Keillor	Andrew Davies	10 March 2013	7.73 (Note: 6.20 million on ITV, 726,000 on the ITV HD simulcast, and 799,000 on ITV +1.)
King Edward VII (David Calder) is invited to attend an after hours shopping spree arranged by Lady Mae. In return the King invites the Selfridges to the opening of Ellen Love's new play, to Rose's dismay. Doris Miller is engaged and Miss Mardle is shocked to discover the identity of her fiancé. Henri Leclair tenders his resignation. George Towler invites Kitty Hawkins to the cinema and Agnes Towler renews her friendship with Victor Colleano. The Selfridges and Lady Mae find that the play is a satire with additions to the script by Frank Edwards, bitterly ridiculing them all. Ashamed, Rose Selfridge takes the children back to the United States. Harry Selfridge is now the King of Oxford Street but estranged from his wife and children.

=== Series 2 (2014) ===
(1914)

No. overall	No. in series	Title	Directed by	Written by	Original release date	UK viewers (millions)
11	1	"Episode 1"	Anthony Byrne	Andrew Davies and Kate Brooke	19 January 2014	6.76 (Note: 5.43 million on ITV, 777,000 on the ITV HD simulcast, and 553,000 on ITV +1.)
June 1914 The store is celebrating five years, and Harry and his wife, Rose, have become increasingly estranged. He's thrilled when she returns to celebrate the fifth anniversary. There's still a rift between them exacerbated by the influence of novelist Delphine Day and their 15-year-old son, Gordon, who wants to leave school and work in the store. Agnes Towler returns from Paris as head of departmental displays. Lady Mae's husband unexpectedly arrives in London and she hears him blackmail his way onto a government military committee amid rumours of impending war.
12	2	"Episode 2"	Anthony Byrne	Kate O'Riordan	26 January 2014	5.73 (Note: 5.16 million on ITV and 569,000 on ITV +1.)
The staff is worried Selfridge will return to the United States if war breaks out. To reassure them, he organises an Empire Exhibition in the Palm Court restaurant and a staff party. The party ends up being held, to Selfridge's apprehension, at Delphine's club at his wife's request. Selfridge agrees to this change, hoping it will reconcile them. Trade unionists stir up the warehouse workers to demand more rights and Selfridge's son, Gordon, joins the meeting. Lord Loxley thwarts Lady Mae's plans to escape to their country house without him by renting it out. He also invites himself to the party to meet Selfridge. Delphine lets it slip that Rose has met Henri Leclair, who has returned to London after a failed venture in New York City.
13	3	"Episode 3"	Rob Evans	Kate Brooke	2 February 2014	5.43 (Note: 4.91 million on ITV and 519,000 on ITV +1.)
July & August 1914 Agnes struggles to get the empire exhibition ready, undermined by Mr Thackeray and the rival departments needs, and Selfridge offers Henri Leclair, to her delight and Victor Colleano's displeasure, a job to assist her. Lord Loxley pays Selfridge a visit to tell him he can get Winston Churchill to open the event in return for information on leather suppliers, while Lady Mae discovers her husband is bankrupt, information she conceals from Selfridge. Mr Grove handed his final warning when late for work again pulls himself together and discovers 80% of the male staff are eligible for the army. Rose finds her son Gordon's collection of racy photos, and they have a heart to heart over the relationship of his parents. War is declared between Britain and Germany.
14	4	"Episode 4"	Rob Evans	Dan Sefton	9 February 2014	5.57 (Note: 5.06 million on ITV and 506,000 on ITV +1.)
News of the first horrors of war in Belgium, threaten a staff shortage as the men of Selfridges enlist headed by Agnes Towler's brother, George. Selfridge appoints Henri Leclair as his deputy to the displeasure of Thackeray. Rose, Delphine and Lady Mae organise a chocolate sale to aid refugees. Miss Mardle is impressed by Belgian chocolatier Jean Neuhaus (Anthony Howell). Victor, about to enlist, faces a family crisis when his uncle has a heart attack. Lord Loxley gets his shady money-making plans off the ground. Frank Edwards, with little sympathy from Selfridge, finds his war reports are censored by the government.
15	5	"Episode 5"	Lawrence Till	Kate O'Riordan	16 February 2014	5.17
The women now working in the loading bay are struggling to do the job in the clothing provided until Rose Selfridge steps in with some suggestions to make the clothing women-friendly. Selfridge wants to do more for the war effort, so Delphine arranges a card game with several senior government figures who could help. Selfridge suggests to Lady Mae that Lord Loxley attend, which Loxley is pleased to do believing he can beat Selfridge. Crabb organises rifle training for the staff and Rose Selfridge includes the women. Thackeray's interest in Henri Leclair's secretive behaviour reaches a new level when he follows him. Miss Mardle receives a Belgian refugee as house guest, a violinist.
16	6	"Episode 6"	Lawrence Till	Kate Brooke	23 February 2014	5.19
German goods are removed from the shelves, and the British government see an opportunity for Selfridge to go secretly to Berlin to engender information. Selfridge organises a charity concert to foster patriotic sentiment and Lady Mae helps out by arranging for her old friend, music hall singer Richard Chapman (Alfie Boe) to perform at the event and Miss Mardle offers the services of her lodger as an accompanist. Agnes and Victor are going out together and he makes a proposal. Thackeray believes Leclair is a German spy and his response is a surprise. As the concert starts Selfridge is spirited away by the government.
17	7	"Episode 7"	Lawrence Till	Dan Sefton	2 March 2014	5.22
In the absence of Selfridge the store is run by Grove and Crabb, who have to deal with Leclair's arrest as a spy with the help of Agnes and Victor. With the death of a worker from the loading bay on the front line, Gordon Selfridge takes on the task of writing a condolence letter. Selfridge, in his absence, is accused by Lord Loxley of providing substandard army equipment to the British Troops and ensures Frank Edwards publishes the scandal together with the knowledge that Selfridge is in Germany. Lady Mae leaves Loxley. Agnes receives a telegram. Leclair, cleared as a spy, is rearrested and handed over to the Americans for embezzlement.
18	8	"Episode 8"	Rob Evans	Kate Brooke	9 March 2014	5.19
Returning from Germany, Selfridge finds his reputation in tatters and the store losing business. Delphine helps by arranging a visit to the store by Hollywood stars and producer Mack Sennett. Agnes, whose brother is missing in action, asks Selfridge to help Leclair by finding the mysterious woman he was looking for, and Selfridge asks a favour from his government contact. Lady Mae, to end her association with Lord Loxley, decides to help Selfridge but he rebuffs her. Selfridge finds the woman who can clear Leclair's name.
19	9	"Episode 9"	Rob Evans	Dan Sefton	16 March 2014	5.01
Losing customers, Harry is determined to get the store back on track and asks Delphine to organise a special event in the Palm Court restaurant. Leclair suggests he invite American journalist Winifred Bonfils Black (Sara Stewart) to write a story about Selfridge's. Agnes doubts she has made the right choice in Victor Colleano. Lady Mae is taken in by the Selfridges, and she and Frank Edwards unite to help Selfridge but his plan backfires. Selfridge's daughters and his mother arrive from the United States just as Rose is diagnosed with lung congestion and has to spend time in the country. Lady Mae gives Delphine an ultimatum and Agnes receives a visitor. After an improper suggestion by her at attempting to seduce him, Selfridge rejects Delphine and tells her he wishes never to see her again.
20	10	"Episode 10"	Rob Evans	Kate O'Riordan	23 March 2014	5.23
Late November 1914 Victor and Agnes tell Selfridge they intend to resign when they marry and Leclair intends to join the French army, causing all three to have second thoughts. Lady Mae searches Lord Loxley's papers for the proof that will clear Selfridge. Miss Mardle tells her Belgian violinist, Florian, that she reciprocates his feelings but is somewhat wary due to their differing age. Before a family thanksgiving dinner Rose Selfridge confides to her husband about the graveness of her condition/illness. Harry is devastated...

=== Series 3 (2015) ===
(1918–1919)

No. overall	No. in series	Title	Directed by	Written by	Original release date	UK viewers (millions)
21	1	"Episode 1"	Rob Evans	Kate Brooke	25 January 2015	4.23
May 1918. The funeral of Rose, Harry's wife, who has died, takes place and a distraught Harry says goodbye. Spring 1919. Selfridge's daughter Rosalie marries Serge de Bolotoff, son of Russian Princess Marie (Zoe Wanamaker), an aviator eager to construct a new aerodrome in West London, on a site also proposed as homes for returning soldiers. Lord Loxley returns to avenge himself against Selfridge. Dissent in the loading bay between the women and returning men from war poses problems, Victor Colleano bribes police to ignore activities in his club, and George Towler starts to work with Victor. Henri Leclair returns from France and he and Agnes marry.
22	2	"Episode 2"	Rob Evans	Kate O'Riordan	1 February 2015	3.99
Selfridge's pursuit of the new homes project is thwarted by Crabb's statement to the company board regarding its viability. The biggest postwar fashion event at the store proves a challenge for the staff; and during a heated exchange, Selfridge fires Thackeray, leaving Henri and Agnes to save the situation with unexpected help from Selfridge's daughter Violette. Lord Loxley sees a way to make trouble for Selfridge by investing in Serge's aerodrome plans. Henri, suffering from shell shock, takes to drinking at Colleano's club.
23	3	"Episode 3"	Rob Evans	Helen Raynor	8 February 2015	4.56
Selfridge personally pays off women made redundant in the loading bay by demobilised soldiers. Proceeding with his plan to buy land for housing, Selfridge finds himself bidding against Lord Loxley (who attends the auction to inflate the hammer price) and pays double what he had intended. Henri has a very public row with Agnes in one of the store's display windows. Lois, Selfridge's mother, investigates Princess Marie's circumstances. Kitty gets her sister, Connie, a job at Selfridge's to get her out of the Edwardses' house, where Connie is annoying Kitty's husband, Frank, who has begun to write a book about out-of-work ex-soldiers -- with unanticipated consequences for his wife and himself when she is attacked.
24	4	"Episode 4"	Robert Del Maestro	Kate Brooke	15 February 2015	3.81
To catch Kitty's attackers, her husband must reveal his involvement with the men, straining their marriage. Another marriage under strain is Rosalie's: she must pay her husband's gambling debts after Lord Loxley, having used him to hurt Selfridge, abandons Sergei's project. To save her marriage, Agnes resigns and takes Henri back to his childhood home to recuperate. Grove decides to hire ex-servicemen to act as undercover security guards within the store. Violette frequents Colleano's nightclub, as does her brother Gordon with shopclerk Grace. After helping the police, Colleano hopes to stop paying protection money to corrupt policemen. A lonely Selfridge proposes marriage to Nancy Webb. Last appearances of Aisling Loftus as Agnes Towler and Gregory Fitoussi as Henri Leclair.
25	5	"Episode 5"	Robert Del Maestro	Helen Raynor	22 February 2015	4.18
Selfridge seeks a new store deputy from his staff, placing Miss Mardle and Mr. Grove in direct competition. A reluctant Gordon is persuaded by Miss Calthorpe to apply. Lord Loxley exploits the fallout from the attack on Kitty Edwards by establishing a charitable foundation for former soldiers that would improve his own poor reputation. Selfridge counters by advancing his and Nancy Webb's plans for the Selfridge estate. Lois Selfridge confronts Princess Marie about her debts. Doris Grove confides in Miss Mardle as to the paternity of her youngest child. The police raid Colleano's club, and he and Violette are arrested.
26	6	"Episode 6"	Joss Agnew	Matt Jones	1 March 2015	4.14
Selfridge sells some of his stock, raising cash for his and Nancy Webb's planned Selfridge estate but losing him majority control of the store. Victor Colleano is approached by a man who will get the police off his back in exchange for hosting gambling in Colleano's nightclub. Mr. Grove is not happy being passed over for promotion and lets Gordon, the new store deputy, give the new head of display approval for a new window display not realizing the embarrassment that it will cause. Kitty Edwards, realizing her husband is powerless to stop Lord Loxley from helping the men who attacked her, seeks George Towler's help to resolve the situation. Miss Mardle's attempt to help Doris Grove and the real father of her baby goes disastrously awry.
27	7	"Episode 7"	Joss Agnew	James Payne	8 March 2015	3.98
Selfridge's relationship with Nancy Webb deepens and she has doubts about her own plans when Lord Loxley, who has purchased the stock Selfridge sold, tries to undermine him at a board meeting. Loxley, to demand a seat on the board, has also acquired Rosalie's shares through Serge, and Selfridge's fury with him dissipates only with the news that Rosalie is pregnant. George Towler, unhappy that Colleano turns a blind eye to drug-taking at the club, walks away. Grove questions why his wife died and a guilt-ridden Miss Mardle reveals the paternity of his son, Ernest; Grove orders her to take the baby away.
28	8	"Episode 8"	Lawrence Till	Helen Raynor	15 March 2015	3.64
Late June 1919. The peace Treaty of Versailles is signed and Selfridge decides to hold a "Britain at Play" event to promote the store; he appoints Frank Edwards as head of print and publications. Lord Loxley heads a group of shareholders examining Selfridges's plans. Colleano decides to make his club a members only gambling establishment, which requires the backing of Regan, the man who has been keeping the police off his back. George Towler convinces Mr Grove to reunite his children, including Ernest. Miss Calthorpe realises she has no future with Gordon Selfridge. Nancy Webb's plans begin to unravel when she accepts a proposal of marriage from Selfridge.
29	9	"Episode 9"	Lawrence Till	Kate O'Riordan	22 March 2015	3.88
To make good his promise to shareholders to increase profits, Selfridge announces a massive sale. Bad publicity engendered by rival stores is exploited by Lord Loxley, who convenes an emergency board meeting. Lord Loxley reads of the forthcoming marriage of Lady Mae. George Towler is re-employed as head of security following an approach to Mr Grove by Miss Mardle. Colleano is under pressure from Regan to make more money from the club's clientele. Nancy Webb's secret partner, unhappy with her plans to marry Selfridge, is discovered by Princess Marie, whose own fortune has taken an upturn.
30	10	"Episode 10"	Lawrence Till	Kate Brooke	29 March 2015	3.96
Selfridge survives a vote of no-confidence engineered by Lord Loxley. Gordon chooses Miss Calthorpe against his father's wishes. Mr Grove and Miss Mardle are reconciled. Nancy Webb confesses to Selfridge when her secret partner, her brother, is arrested and Selfridge ends their relationship despite her professing her love for him. Violette is again rejected by Victor Colleano and she goes to Paris to await a proposal of marriage from Jacques de Sibour, an airman friend of Serge. Lord Loxley sells his shares to a mysterious backer intent on owning the store.

=== Series 4 (2016) ===
(1928–1929)

No. overall	No. in series	Title	Directed by	Written by	Original release date	UK viewers (millions)
31	1	"Episode 1"	Robert Del Maestro	Helen Raynor	8 January 2016	4.09
It's 1928 and nine years on, retail magnate Harry is enjoying his time at the heart of the Roaring Twenties. In store, while about to unveil a new monument he receives a very special visitor – though a later accident places his role at the helm in jeopardy. Elsewhere, Mr Grove celebrates his birthday in the company of his now 19-year-old daughter Meryl, and store favourite Kitty Edwards is keen to show off her luxurious new abode – while her sister Connie has some exciting news.
32	2	"Episode 2"	Robert Del Maestro	Helen Raynor	15 January 2016	3.77
After his accident Selfridge is annoyed with his son Gordon whom the newspapers report is taking over. Returning to the store he upsets Mae when he insists the Dolly Sisters take part in the promotion of her fashion wear. Selfridge opens a new technology department. Mae takes on a black seamstress. Mr Grove's daughter upsets the customers on her first day. Kitty and Frank Edwards come to terms with Connie's news. Tragedy once again strikes Selfridge when he returns home to find his mother, Lois dead in the chair, having died in her sleep.
33	3	"Episode 3"	Bill Anderson	Matt Jones	22 January 2016	3.62
Despite the loss of his mother Selfridge continues gambling and womanising particularly with Rosie Dolly. He embarks on a dubious cash raising scheme on the stock exchange with new found friend Jimmy Dillon. This infuriates Gordon as it involves the provincial stores that he had built up. Kitty Hawkins meets her heroine Elizabeth Arden who offers her a job in New York that does not please her husband. Mr Grove has a fall, to be told by doctors he has a terminal illness.
34	4	"Episode 4"	Bill Anderson	James Payne	29 January 2016	3.64
Pleased with the money he has made on the stock exchange Selfridge acquires new stores on the continent announcing it in Biarritz at a party with his friend Jimmy Dillon, the Dolly Sisters, and journalists that he has flown over. Mae meets him there to implore him to make peace with his son Gordon. The party gets out of hand and Frank Edwards unable to control events and a story concerning Rosalie Selfridge's marriage is published. Miss Mardle on hearing of his health returns to see Mr Grove. The Dolly sisters become involved in a film project but the backers pull out and Selfridge bankrolls the film with money he had intended to pay off his gambling debts to London gangster D'Ancona.
35	5	"Episode 5"	Fraser MacDonald	Ben Morris	5 February 2016	3.37
The ground floor of the department store is transformed into a film set as the Dolly Sisters and famed-actor Bumby Wallace shoot "Double Trouble". Miss Mardle is reconciled with Mr Grove and his children. Kitty comes to realise what happened in France between Frank and another journalist. Mae reconnects with old-flame Victor Colleano, to Jimmy's annoyance, at Selfridge's party for the completion of the film. D'Ancona sends Selfridge a message as the party is in full swing.
36	6	"Episode 6"	Fraser MacDonald	Kate O'Riordan	12 February 2016	3.14
Selfridge's debts to D'Ancona come home to roost when his inability to pay starts to affect his family. Rosalie has her possessions taken and Gordon has to sell the Northern stores through a deal Jimmy Dillon has brokered. Selfridge ends his relationship with the Dolly sisters. Mr Grove and Miss Mardle are married. Frank tells Kitty she should take the job in New York offered by Elizabeth Arden. Jimmy Dillon's jealousy of Victor Colleano's rekindled friendship with Mae results in a fight and Colleano falling from a balcony.
37	7	"Episode 7"	Joss Agnew	Hamish Wright	19 February 2016	3.33
June 1928. Kitty Edwards leaves for her new job in New York and after seeking advice from Selfridge, Frank goes with her. Gordon Selfridge resolves a lawsuit between his father and press baron Lord Wynnstay. Meryl Grove pleads for Mae's black seamstress who has been given extra work only for Mr Grove to dismiss her. Selfridge's consolidation plans are put on hold when he agrees to Jimmy Dillon's scheme to buy iconic Bayswater store William Whiteley Limited. Lord Wynnstay's reporter finds a connection between Colleano, Selfridge, D'Ancona and Jimmy Dillon.
38	8	"Episode 8"	Joss Agnew	Matt Jones	26 February 2016	3.18
Whiteleys accounts prove a problem to Selfridge. Mr Crabb inspects the books and finds suppliers unpaid and no stock in the store. Mr Grove retires and is retained as a consultant to Whiteleys – but is unable to fulfill this commitment, dying peacefully in his garden. Seamstress Tilly Brockless is reinstated after Meryl Grove pleads her case with her father with the sewing room supervisor forced to leave. Selfridge comes up with plan to restock Whiteleys. Lord Wynnstay's reporter's investigation unsettles Mae.
39	9	"Episode 9"	Rob Evans	Kate O'Riordan	4 March 2016	3.28
Jimmy Dillon struggles to run Whiteleys as suppliers refuse to lift their embargo. He hatches a secret plan with a reluctant Crabb to save the store. Miss Mardle struggles with the children's and her own grief and Mr Crabb offers a solution. Connie Towler goes into labour. Lord Wynnstay's exposé of Dillon comes to a head and he confesses to Selfridge who feels his trust betrayed by him and Mae who had her suspicions.
40	10	"Episode 10"	Rob Evans	Helen Raynor	11 March 2016	3.51
March 1929. Final episode. Jimmy Dillon's final act leaves Selfridge shaken and Gordon struggling to hold things together. Mae leaves for Paris. Selfridge returns to the store and promotes Miss Mardle to deputy manager and his attempt to woo the suppliers backfires when the embargo is extended to Selfridge's. Gordon approaches the main shareholder Civic Assurance, and brokers a deal to save the store who agree as long as Selfridge stands down. Mr Crabb also retires. On the 20th anniversary Selfridge leaves the store for the last time to be met by Mae.

== Reception ==
In a poll hosted by MSN more than 80% of readers said they would continue watching the show following the first episode. Phil Hogan writing for The Guardian bemoaned the story development. He observed that there is "so much crisis with so little drama". Ross Sweeney from Cultbox said that the show had direction but lacked "actual substance and any real surprises". He praised the costume designers for their "astonishing attention to detail". Susanna Lazarus of the Radio Times opined that the character's earnestness detracted from the realism of the story. She added the female cast created the "plot tension" needed to maintain viewership. Gabriel Tate of Time Out branded it an unsubtle, daft series with glorious production values but felt it was "ideal escapism for a Sunday night". He also stated that the character of Agnes Towler was "the heart of the show". Benjamin Secher from The Daily Telegraph said that Mr Selfridge is a "less cosy, more charismatic" production of The Paradise. A "sumptuous, frothy drama" and "entertaining spectacle", but ultimately Secher did not believe the story. MSN critic Dan Owen branded it "sumptuous Sunday evening viewing". He thought the "wonderful" sets and costumes were better than those featured in fellow period drama Downton Abbey.

== International broadcasts ==
The programme has been distributed internationally by ITV Studios' Global Entertainment brand. ITV sold the series to a number of countries at the 2012 Mipcom event. In addition they have pre-sold the show to Australia's Seven Network and the satellite television provider, Yes, in Israel. In the Netherlands, Series 1 was aired starting August, 2013 and series 2 was aired from July 2014. In Sweden "Mr Selfridge" was aired at the public service network SVT. The last two episodes of season 4 were aired as a double on 25 June 2016 on SVT1. The series began broadcasting on 31 March 2013 on PBS drama anthology program, Masterpiece in the United States.
