= Deborah Milner =

British fashion designer (born 1964)

- Born: 1964 (age 61–62)
- Education: Central Saint Martins; Royal College of Art
- Label: Ecoture
- Website: http://www.deborahmilner.net

Deborah Milner (born 1964) is a British fashion designer, active since the 1990s. Since 2000, she has focused on ecologically aware design, founding her ecological couture line, Ecoture, in 2005. In the early 2010s, she was head of the Alexander McQueen couture studio.

== Career ==
=== 1990s ===
Milner studied at Central Saint Martins and the Royal College of Art. Whilst she gained a reputation among fashion insiders as a creative designer who used unusual materials, including a skirt made from film negatives and garments using wire and steel mesh filters, and was recognised for the superb cut of her clothing, she was not immediately successful. Eventually, whilst sharing a studio with Philip Treacy, Milner became principally a designer of wedding dresses.

Her highest-profile wedding dress was a 1997 beaded lace gown worn by Estelle Skornik as 'Nicole' in the final instalment of the Papa & Nicole advertisements for Renault, which was estimated to have been seem by 23 million viewers. Renault subsequently donated the dress and accessories to the Victoria and Albert Museum. Another of Milner's wedding dresses, an ecclesiastical silk coatdress worn in 1998 by Selina Blow with a huge golden headdress by Treacy, was featured in the Museum's major Wedding Dress exhibition in 2014.

In 1997, a purple velvet Milner evening coat was chosen by Isabella Blow as part of her selection of garments representing 1997 in the Fashion Museum, Bath's Dress of the Year collection, alongside designs by Treacy, Hussein Chalayan, Julien MacDonald, and Lainey Keogh. Blow also owned a red velvet coat by Milner that she wore in a photograph that would later be the lead image for a posthumous exhibition of her wardrobe at Somerset House in 2013. Daphne Guinness, Blow's friend and organiser of the exhibition, told Vogue that she thought the coat "epitomised Isabella, somehow," hence the decision to use it as the main publicity image. Women's Wear Daily declared the coat one of the highlights of the Blow exhibition.

In 1998, Milner designed a Dior-inspired purple corset-bodice dress for Helena Bonham Carter to wear to the Oscars. Bonham Carter later commented "I've never before attached that much importance to what I wear. Now it's monumental," after having her dress praised by Newsday and Vogue. That same year, Donatella Versace signed Milner up to head up a design studio at Versace.

The Victoria & Albert Museum showed her work in 1999 as part of the Fashion in Motion project, describing Milner as a 'leading British designer' in accompanying publicity.

=== 2000s ===
Growing "disillusioned" with fashion design, Milner took a career break in 2000, and lived in Brazil for a while, while trying to decide how she could become involved in environmental and social issues, eventually realising that she could combine these with her fashion design skills. In 2005, with the financial backing of Aveda, Milner launched Ecoture, dedicated to the development of couture fashions that combined high end style with sustainability. The first Ecouture show was presented in September 2006 at London Fashion Week. It presented clothes and accessories made using left-over fabric from other manufacturers, a 'lace' dress where old plastic bags were tied together and melted using heat to create a lacy pattern, textiles dyed using natural dyes and accessories made from wood from sustainable sources.

In 2011 Milner designed a bright blue dress for Tara Palmer-Tomkinson to wear to the wedding of Prince William and Catherine Middleton. The outfit drew media attention, with The Telegraph praising it and the matching Treacy hat and Nicholas Kirkwood shoes as chic, but criticising the 'matchy-matchy' nature of the additional accessories. As of 2012-13, Milner is head of the Alexander McQueen couture studio under Sarah Burton's direction, and had previously collaborated with Alexander McQueen before his death.
