= Doll hat =

Fashion item

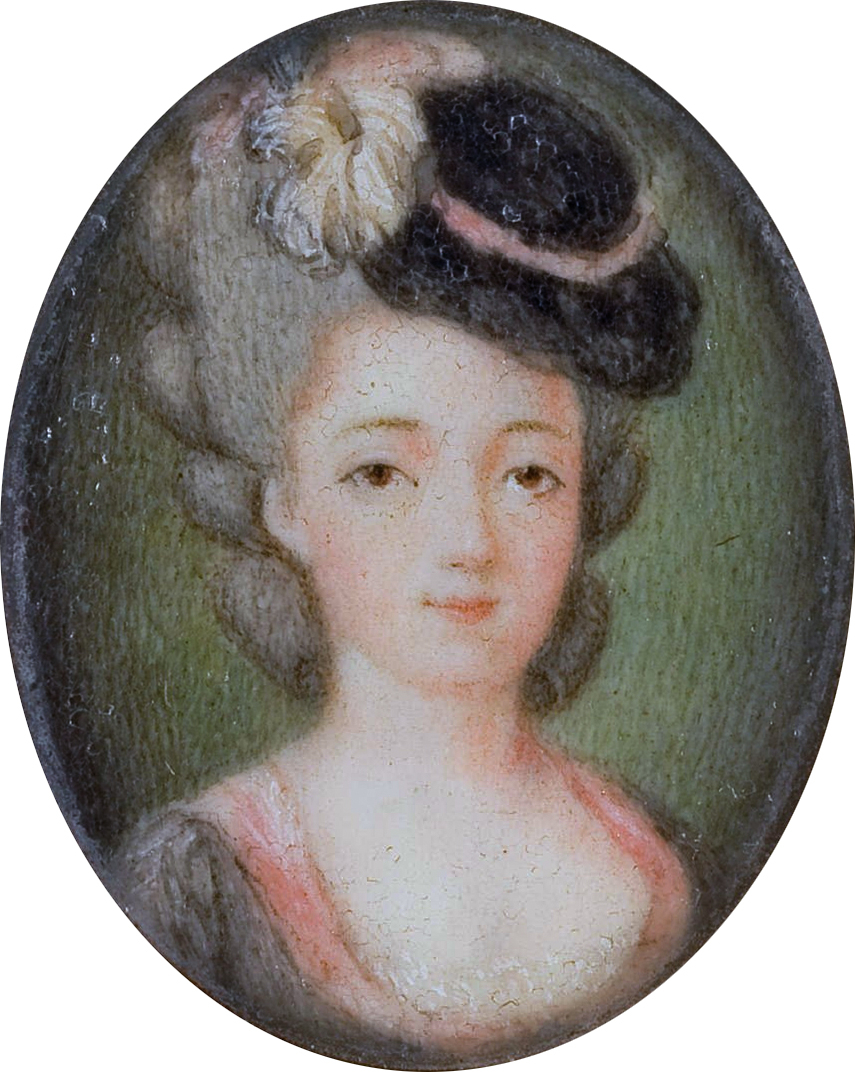
A later copy of an 18th-century miniature showing a doll-hat design worn as decoration for an ornate wig

A doll hat (sometimes doll's hat) is a women's millinery design scaled down to suggest a hat that could be worn by a doll. It can be of any design and is generally worn at the front of the head. The hat is usually held in place with a band of fabric or elastic secured at the back of the head.

== Origins of the hat ==
The doll hat had periods of popularity in both the 18th and 19th centuries. This was an era of elaborate hairstyles and the hat was a decorative accessory rather than serving a practical function.

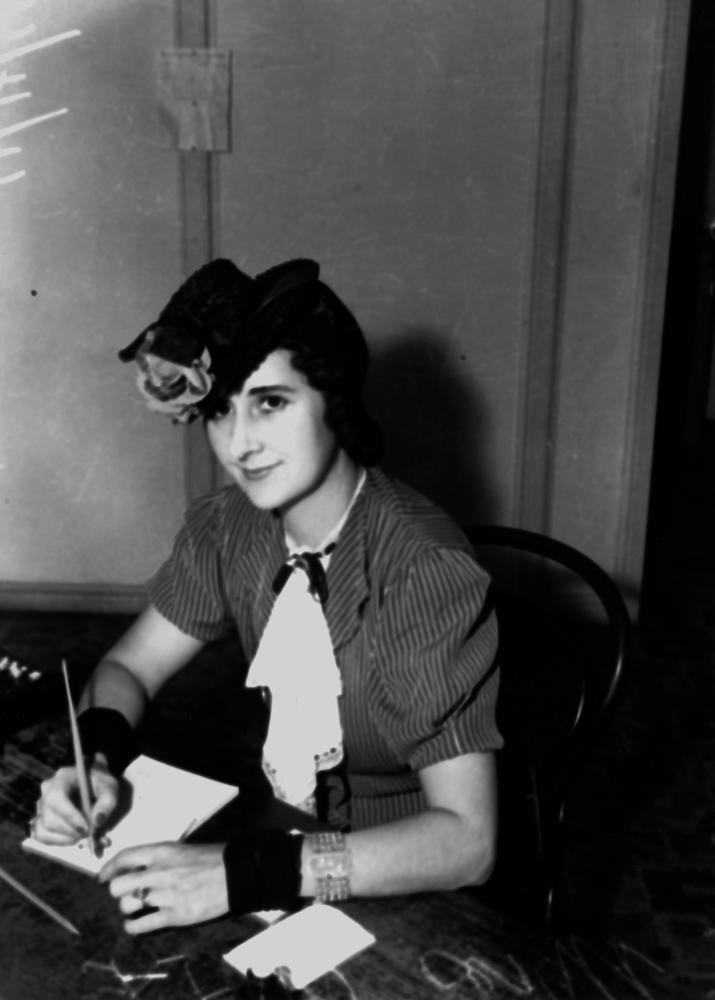
A 1946 version of the doll hat, also worn tilted forward on the head

Doll hats became popular again in the 1930s. A report in The Times in 1937 on the latest London millinery described a miniature bonnet as among the key introductions: "A hat that looks like a doll's hat has been made of Leghorn; the floral topknot of the evening translated, as it were, into daytime wear. It needs only ribbon strings to reproduce the young matron's bonnet of the Victorian era". As with earlier version of the hat, this was a decorative style suited to occasion wear. A fashion report in 1938 described an Edwardian-style model of indigo blue feathers decorated with a winged bird as ideal for: "grander occasions or the theatre".

Later that year, the paper reported a new fashion for vivid doll hats in fuchsia, violet or Florentine blue worn with all-black outfits. The paper added that when a black doll hat was chosen, it should have a contrasting veil in a bright shade such as blue or pink matched with the same hue in gloves or buttonhole.

The popularity of miniature hat continued into World War II. In the United States, the absence of imports from French milliners inspired American designers to innovate. Variations on the beret, bowler and boater were introduced – along with forward tilted miniature hats. Although American Vogue magazine warned its readers in 1941 that doll hat designs were: "definitely not for the unselfconfident", the design became very popular during the war years.

=== Variations ===
While many versions of the doll hat replicated traditional straw hats in miniature, variations included scaled down witches' hats and Welsh hats.

== See also ==
- List of hat styles
- Cocktail hat
- Fascinator
