= Louise Kennedy =

Irish fashion designer

- Born: 28 June 1960 (age 65); Puckane, County Tipperary, Ireland
- Website: http://www.louisekennedy.com

Louise Kennedy is an Irish fashion designer and businesswoman who, in 2013, was called the "uncrowned queen of Irish fashion".

== Career ==
Kennedy studied at the College of Marketing and Design, now part of Dublin Institute of Technology and the Grafton Academy, before setting up her own business in 1983, according to her official website. (Some sources say 1982, or 1984.)

In 1990 she was commissioned by Mary Robinson, the first female president of Ireland, to design a purple moiré outfit for her presidential inauguration. Robinson subsequently became a regular customer, wearing Louise Kennedy outfits through her term in office and afterwards. Kennedy stated that she had been very fortunate by the timing of this, as it drew a great deal of attention and media coverage with many Irish clients suddenly made aware of her work and choosing to buy from her. That same year she was chosen to exhibit at the London Designer Show. In the mid-'90s she joined the British Fashion Council, showing her collections at London Fashion Week twice a year.

She opened her flagship stores in Dublin (at 56 Merrion Square) and London in 1997, the same year in which she designed uniforms for flight staff on Aer Lingus. Since 1999 she has also designed glassware for Tipperary Crystal, collaborating with Marcus Notley since 2001.

In 2009, she designed new judge's robes for the Irish Law Courts, marking a break from the traditional British robes that previous judges had worn. In 2011 Kennedy started offering bespoke wedding dresses. In 2013, the 30th anniversary of her company, she launched a range of personalised designer handbags, produced in collaboration with the British luxury leather goods company Tanner Krolle.

In April 2014, Kennedy was among the Irish designers chosen to create the wardrobe for Irish President Michael D. Higgins's wife Sabina for their state visit to London. The outfits, apart from two custom-made ball gowns for state banquets, one by Kennedy and the other by Jill Howard, were bought as ready-to-wear, and chosen by Sabina with the assistance of her friend, the film and theatrical costume designer Joan Bergin, in order to showcase the best of Irish design, with Bergin saying "It was not my intention to commission a special wardrobe, but to show Irish women what was on offer out there." The outfits were widely acclaimed in the Irish press, with the Irish Independent dedicating an article to the fact that Sabina wore three separate Kennedy ensembles in one day.

Alongside Sabina Higgins and Mary Robinson, Kennedy has also dressed the British Prime Ministers' wives Cherie Blair and Sarah Brown. In 1998, she replaced Ronit Zilkha as Cherie Blair's favourite designer. Other clients include the Duchess of Edinburgh, Meryl Streep, Kirsty Young, and Enya.

In December 2014 Kennedy joined a group of mainly British designers, artists and businesspeople (including David Bailey, Roja Dove and Stella McCartney) at 10 Downing Street to mark their roles as ambassadors for David Cameron's GREAT Britain campaign, which was designed to promote the United Kingdom as a tourist destination, a place for study, or somewhere to do business.

== Awards ==
Kennedy was named Irish Designer of the Year award in 1989 and 1990. She won a Fashion Oscar in 1992 for the Best Irish Designer Collection and in 1994 was the first female designer to receive an award for Outstanding Achievements in Fashion from the Irish Clothing Industry. For her achievements in Irish fashion she was elected Tipperary Person of the Year in 1992. She has also been named Veuve Cliquot's Irish Businesswoman of the Year for 2003 and 2004. In 2009 she became the first woman to act as style envoy for Mercedes-Benz. In 2014, The Irish Post gave Louise Kennedy a Company of the Year award.

Throughout her career Kennedy has been recognised for her suit and coat designs, winning awards specifically for these in 1985 (Best Irish Coat Collection), 1991 (Best Suit and Best Coat Award), and 1993 (Best Coat and Suit Collection Designer of the Year).

In November 2014 Kennedy was awarded an honorary PhD from her former university, the Dublin Institute of Technology, in recognition of her commercial and cultural success.

On Saturday 21 November 2017, the Royal College of Physicians of Ireland (RCPI) awarded Kennedy an honorary fellowship, which is the highest honour bestowed by the RCPI. This award is reserved for world leaders in medical science and those who have made an exceptional contribution to society.

== In popular culture ==
In 2010 Kennedy was one of six contemporary Irish fashion designers featured on a set of Irish postage stamps issued by An Post. The other designers featured were Paul Costelloe, Lainey Keogh, John Rocha, Philip Treacy and Orla Kiely.

Along with Costelloe, she was a celebrity guest judge for the 2013 final of RTÉ Television's Craft Master show.

Kennedy's Dublin showroom neighbours the former home of another Irish designer, Sybil Connolly.
