= Fascinator =

Elaborate ornamental headpiece

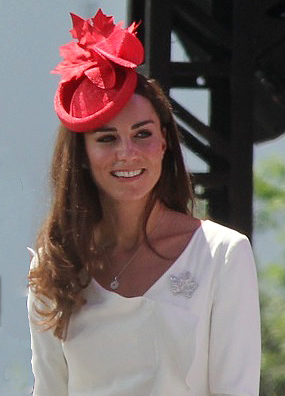
Catherine, Princess of Wales, then Duchess of Cambridge, wearing a red fascinator during her visit to Canada in 2011

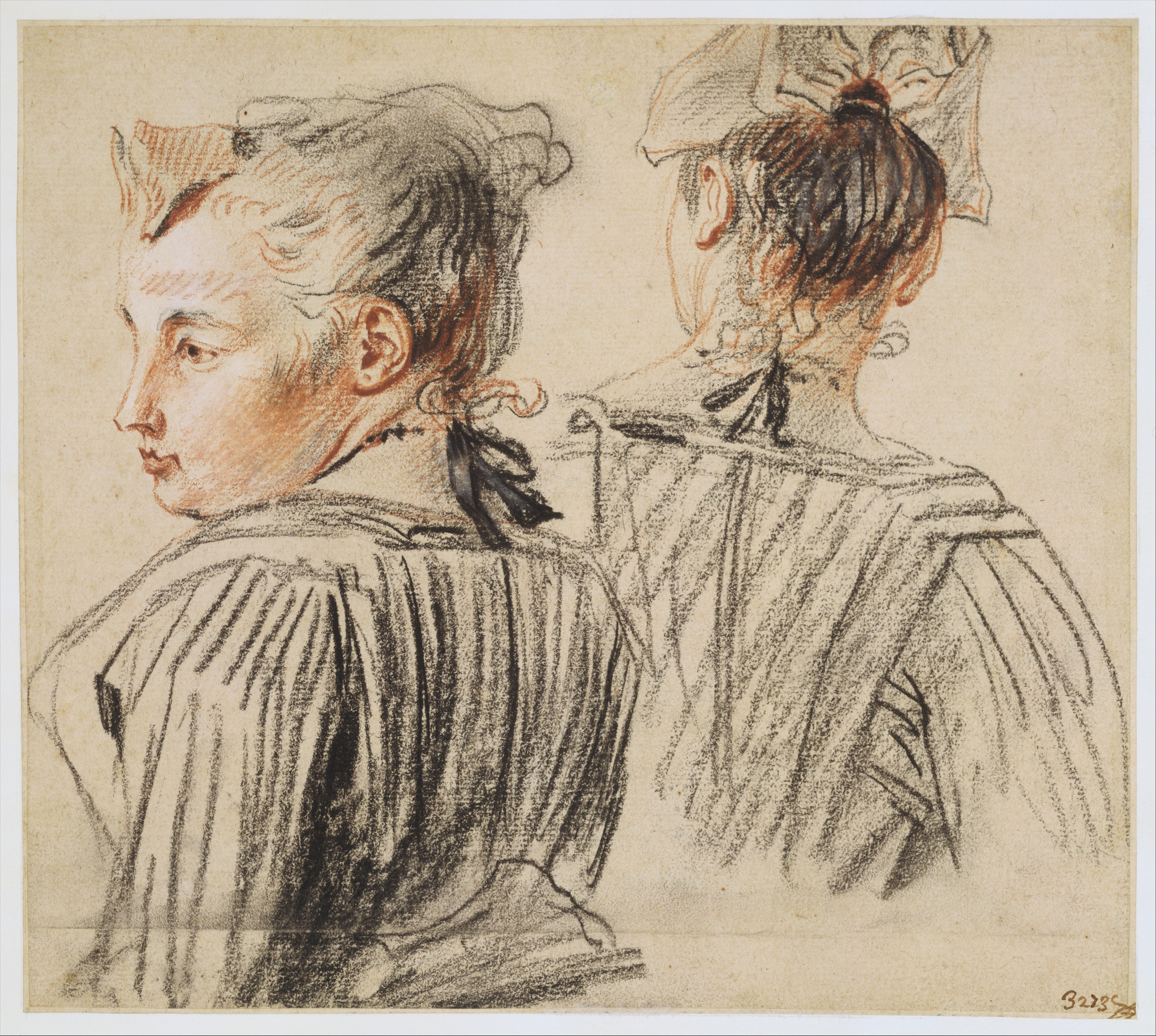
Antoine Watteau: Studies of a woman wearing a cap (1717–1718)

A fascinator is a formal headpiece, a style of millinery. Since the 1990s, the term has referred to a type of formal headwear worn as an alternative to the hat; it is usually a large decorative design attached to a band or clip. In contrast to a hat, its function is purely ornamental: it covers very little of the head and offers little or no protection from the weather. An intermediate form, incorporating a more substantial base to resemble a hat, is sometimes called a hatinator. In recent times, especially in countries like Australia and New Zealand, the term ‘fascinator’ has devolved to often refer to mass-produced cheap hairpieces (and used in a more derogatory sense); pieces handmade by qualified milliners are referred to instead by the generic term ‘headpiece’, or by the particular style such as cocktail hat, percher, etc.

== Etymology ==
The word "fascinator" is derived from the verb to fascinate.

== History ==
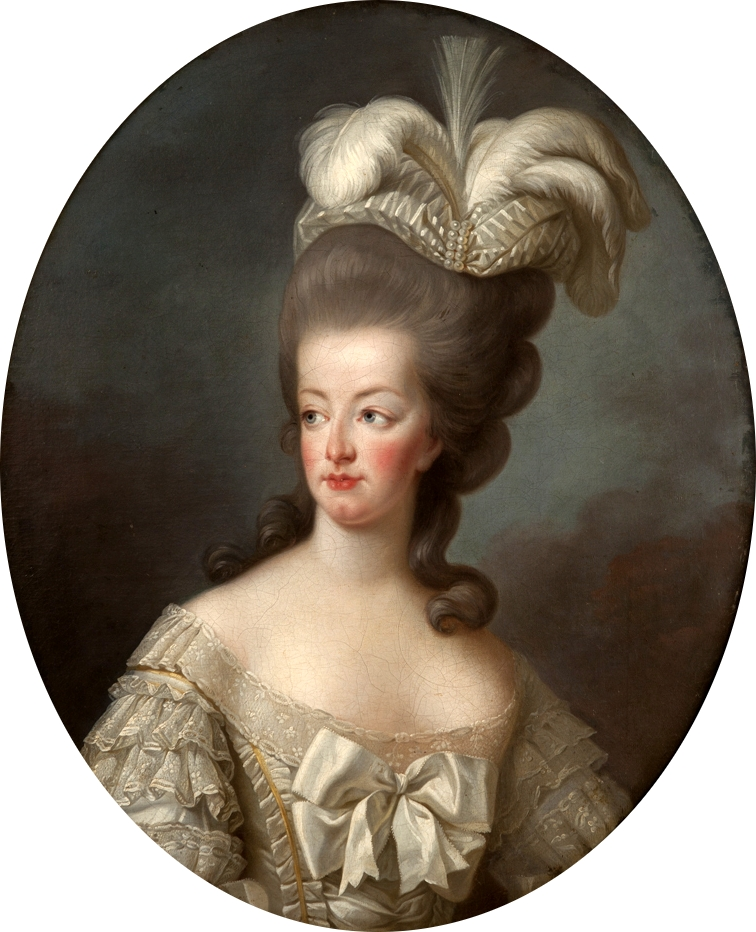
Élisabeth Vigée-Lebrun: Marie Antoinette, Queen of France (1778) with feathers on her hair cover.

=== Earlier decorative headpieces ===
It was customary for Christian women in Europe to wear some sort of headcovering. The European fashion of decorating the female head with a round-brimmed headgear (or hat) can be traced back to the late Renaissance era of the 16th century when some rare Tudor bonnets appear to have a brim. Starting with the Baroque era of the 17th century, brimless head decorations developed. Queen Marie Antoinette made the fashion of using ostrich plumes as a head decoration popular among the European royal courts. Increased trade with Africa meant ostrich feathers were becoming more readily available to be used in fashion items, although this was still costly and therefore affordable only to the aristocracy and wider upper classes.

=== 19th-century fascinators ===
In the mid-19th-century United States, the term "fascinator" was first applied to headwear. In this context, a fascinator was a lightweight hood or scarf worn about the head and tied under the chin, typically knitted or crocheted. The earliest citation identified by the Oxford English Dictionary for the use of the word in this sense is from an advertisement in the Daily National Intelligencer of December 1853. The fascinator was made from soft, lightweight yarns and may originally have been called a "cloud". The "cloud" is described in 1871 as being "a light scarf of fine knitting over the head and round the neck, [worn] instead of an opera hood when going out at night". The fascinator went out of fashion in the 1930s, by which time it described a lacy hood similar to a "fussy balaclava". Apart from the common terminology, these fascinators bore no relationship to the modern headpiece.

=== Modern ===
The use of the term "fascinator" to describe a particular form of late-20th- and early-21st-century millinery emerged towards the end of the late 20th century, possibly as a term for 1990s designs inspired by the small 1960s cocktail hats, which were designed to perch upon the highly coiffed hairstyles of the period. The Oxford English Dictionary cites a use of the word (in quotation marks) from the Australian Women's Weekly of January 1979, but here it appears to have been used in a slightly variant sense, to describe a woman's hat incorporating a small veil (in other words, a cocktail hat). However, the term was certainly in use in its modern sense by 1999.

Although they did not give the style its name, the milliners Stephen Jones and Philip Treacy are credited with having established and popularised fascinators in 20th-century couture.

== Uses ==
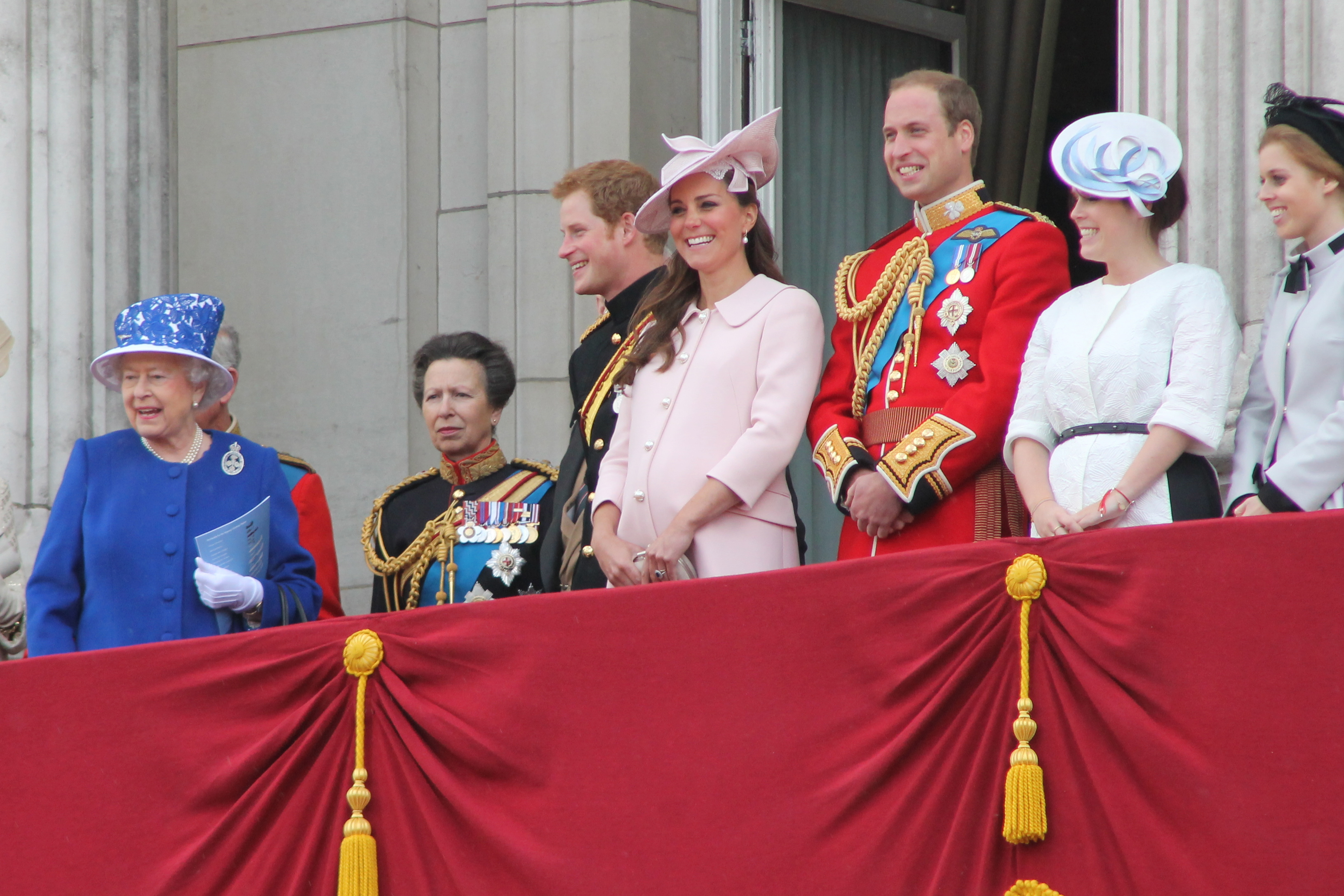
The British royal family, with the Queen wearing a blue hat, Catherine—then the Duchess of Cambridge—a pink hatinator, Princess Eugenie of York a fascinator, and Princess Beatrice of York a black hat (June 2013).

A fascinator is worn on occasions where hats are customary, sometimes serving as an evening accessory, when it may be called a cocktail hat. It is generally worn with fairly formal attire. In addition, fascinators are frequently worn by women as a Christian headcovering during church services, especially weddings.

A substantial fascinator is a fascinator of some size or bulk. Bigger than a barrette, modern fascinators are commonly made with feathers, flowers or beads. They need to be attached to the hair by a comb, headband or clip. They are particularly popular at premium horse-racing events, such as the Grand National, Kentucky Derby and the Melbourne Cup. Brides may choose to wear them as an alternative to a bridal veil or hat, particularly if their gowns are non-traditional.

At the wedding of Prince William and Catherine Middleton in April 2011, various female guests arrived wearing fascinators. Among them was Princess Beatrice of York, who wore a piece designed by the Irish milliner Philip Treacy. The unusual shape and colour caused quite a media stir and went on to become an internet phenomenon with its own Facebook page. Princess Beatrice used the publicity to auction it off on eBay, where it garnered €99,000 for charity.

In 2012, Royal Ascot announced that women would have to wear hats, not fascinators, as part of a tightening of the dress code in Royal Ascot's Royal Enclosure. In previous years, female racegoers were simply advised that "many ladies wear hats".

== Hatinator ==
The term "hatinator", which emerged in the early 2010s, is used to describe headgear that combines the features of a hat and a fascinator. The hatinator is fastened on the head with a band like a fascinator, but has the appearance of a hat, while a fascinator is much smaller and normally does not go over the sides of the head. The particular style of headgear favoured by the Princess of Wales, is sometimes described as a hatinator.

== Gallery ==
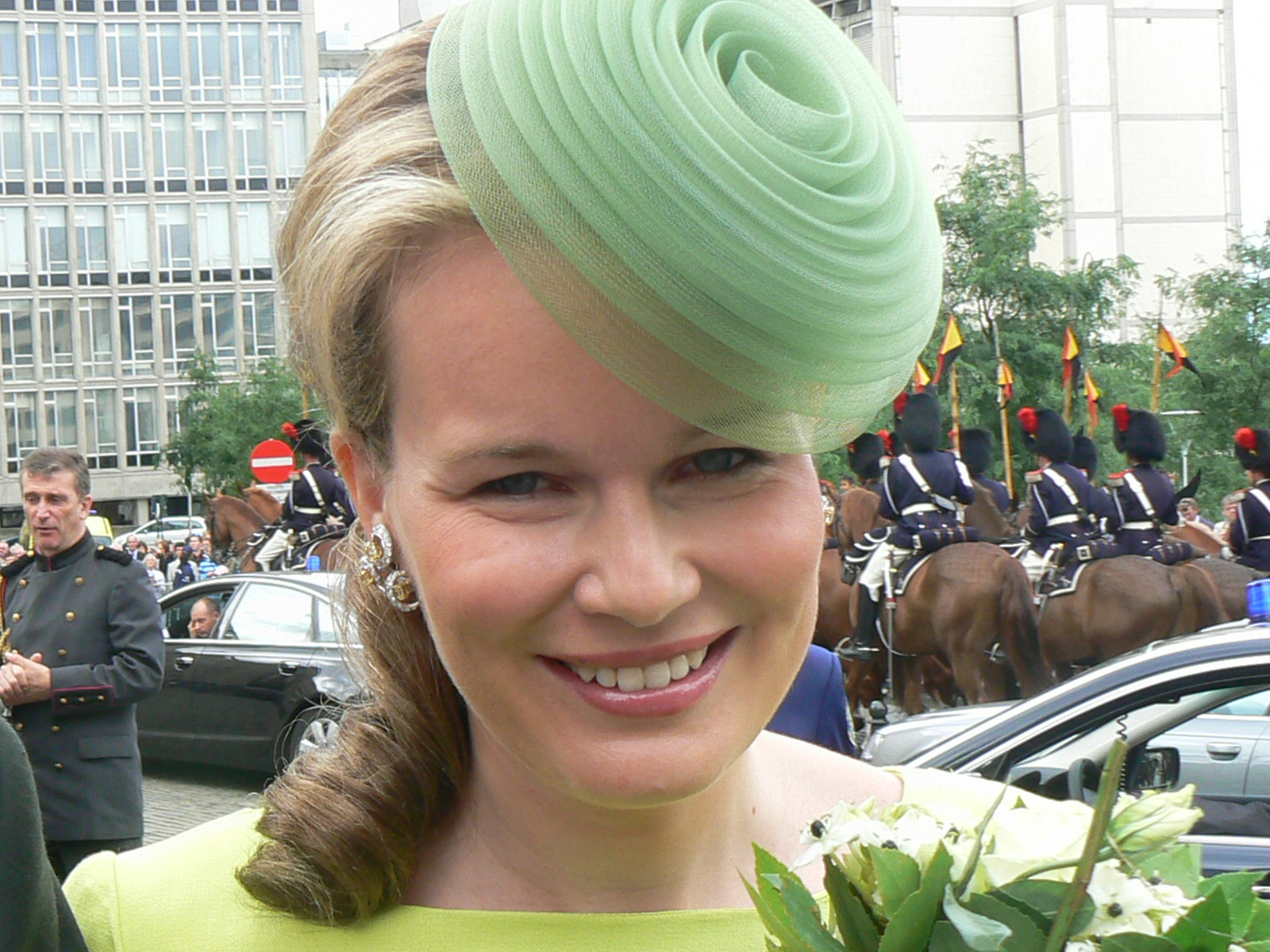
Queen Mathilde of Belgium wearing a light green fascinator

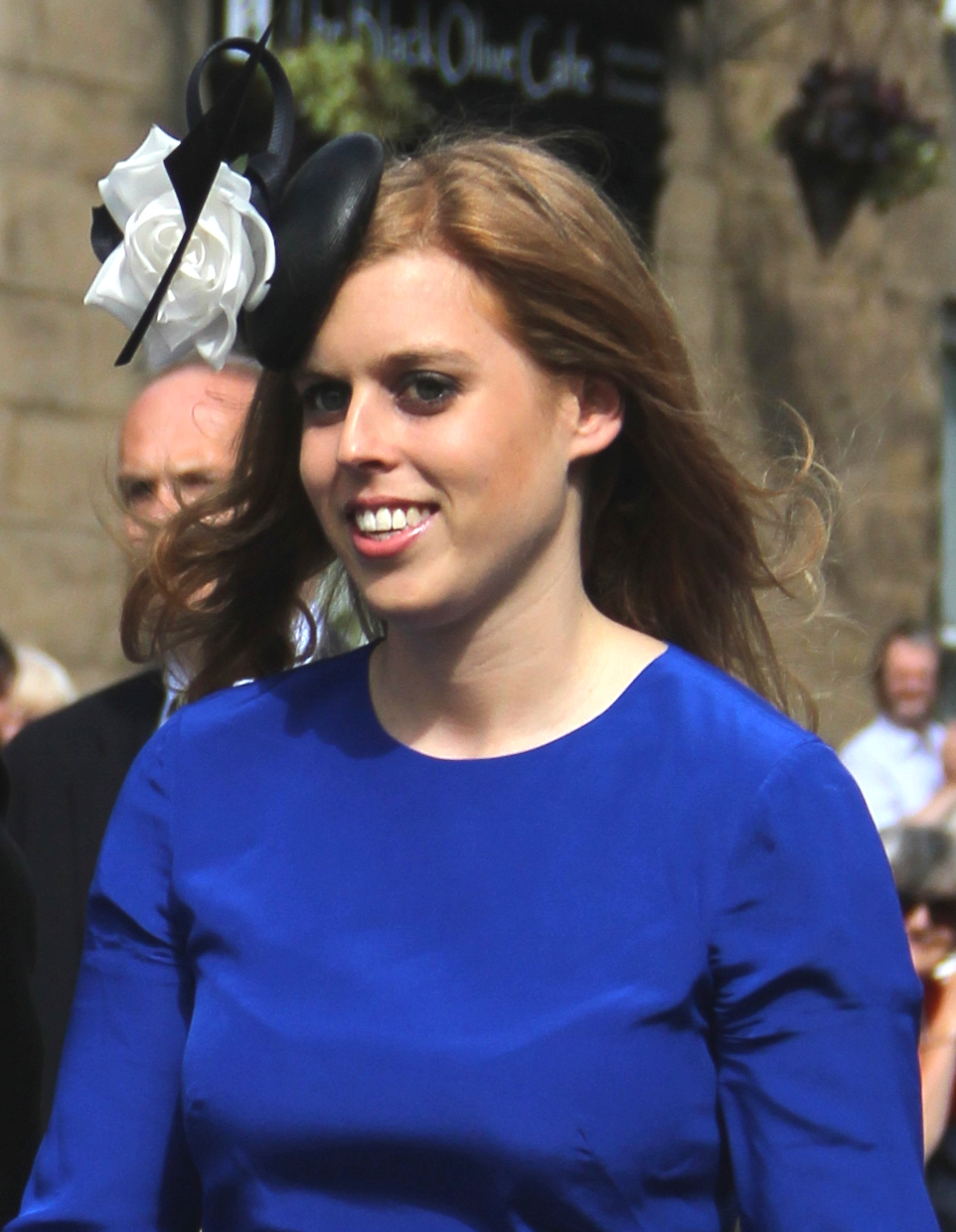
Princess Beatrice of York wearing a black-and-white fascinator

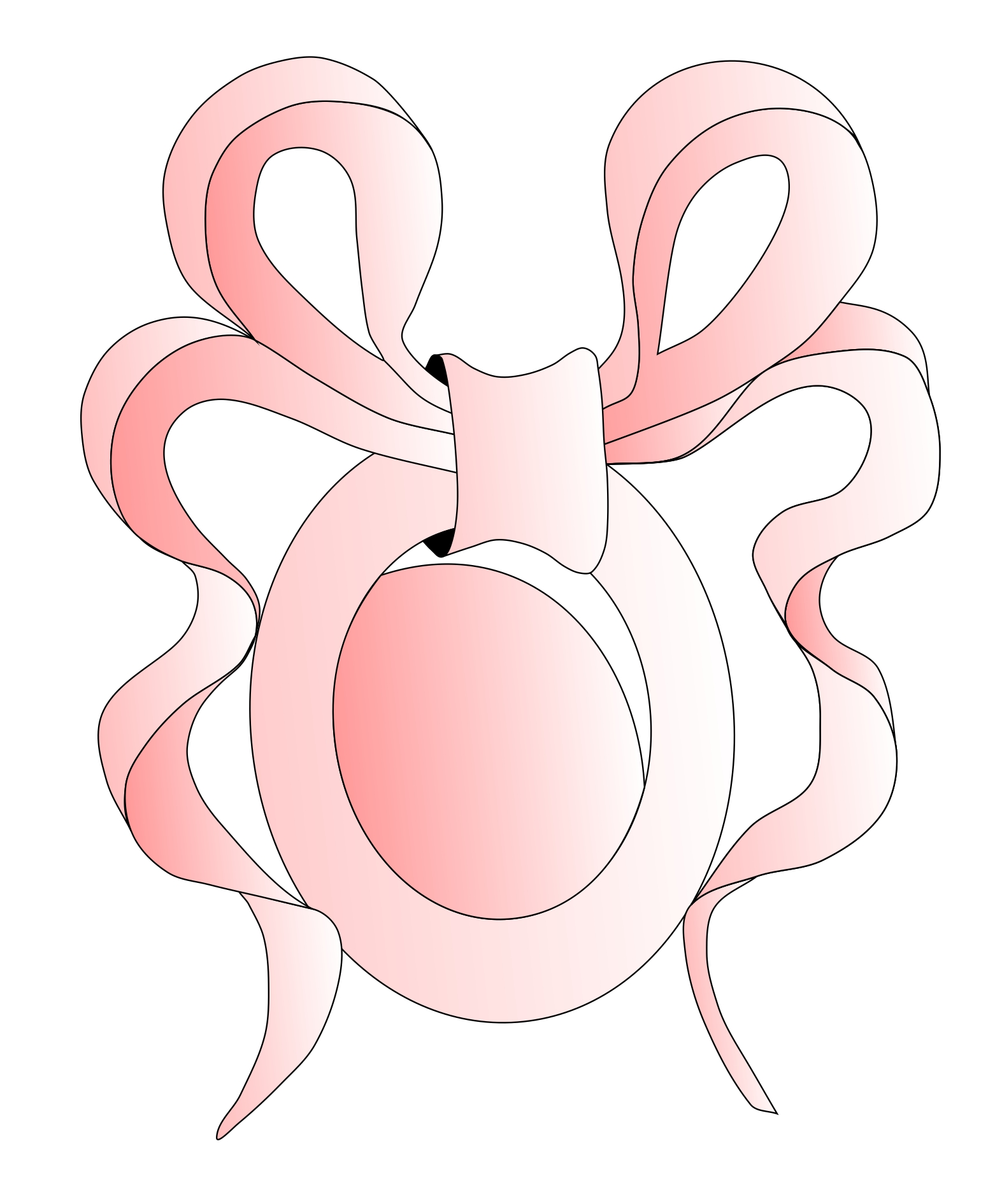
Drawing of Princess Beatrice's 2011 fascinator, by Philip Treacy

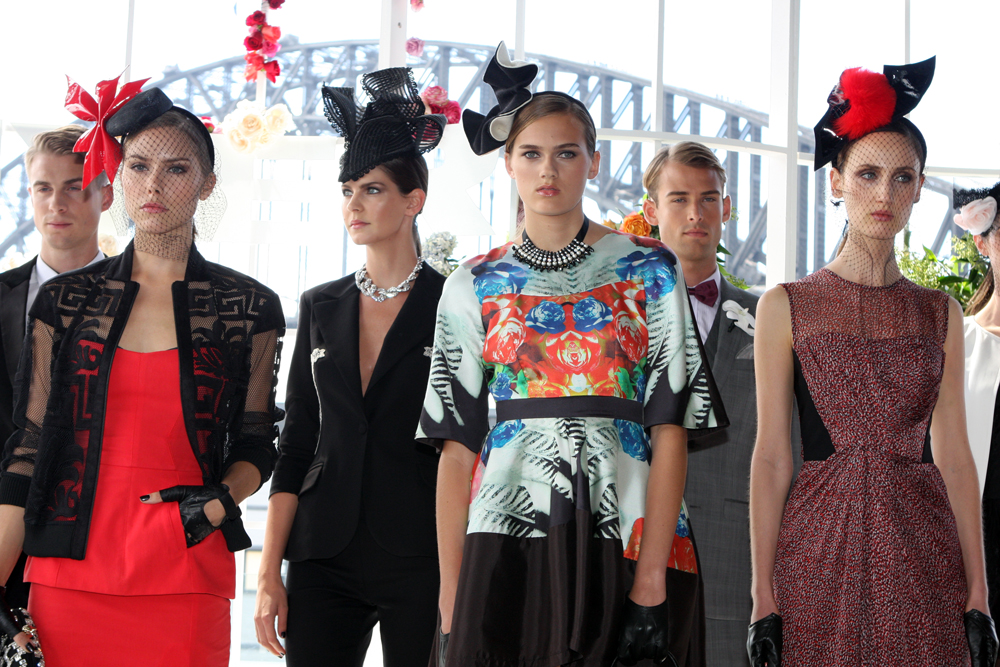
Fascinators worn at the Myer Racing collection preview 2013 (Amber Sherlock third from left)

== See also ==
- Doll hat
- List of hat styles
