= Cocktail hat =

Small, extravagant, and typically brimless hat for a woman

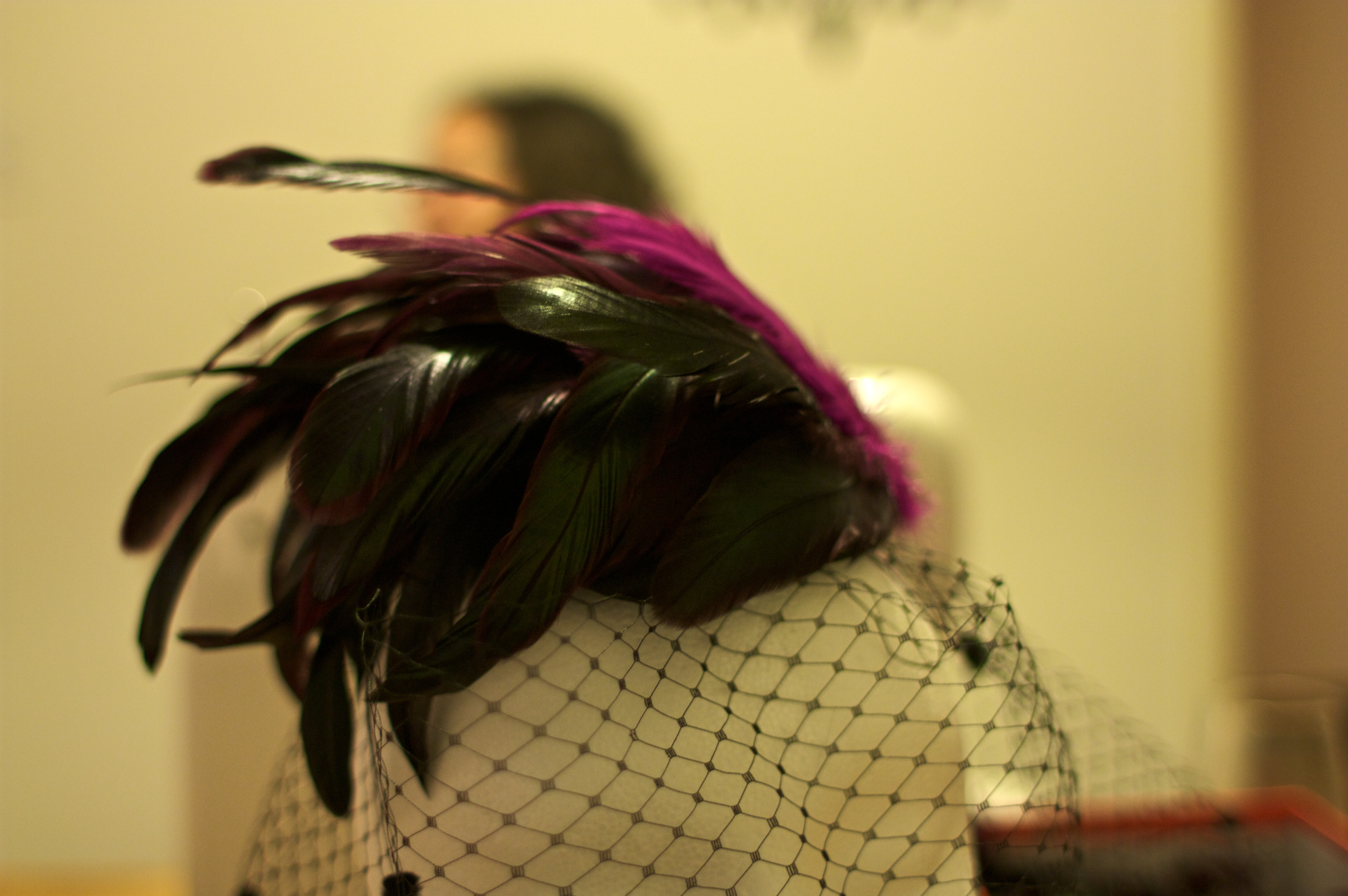
A cocktail hat

A cocktail hat is a small, extravagant, and typically brimless hat for a woman. It is usually a component of evening wear and is intended as an alternative to a large-brimmed hat. These hats are often decorated with beads, jewels or feathers, as well as a veil or netting. Cocktail hats were most popular between the 1930s and 1960s.

Some fashion historians think that cocktail hats were the precursor to fascinators, hairpieces worn on the side of the head that gained popularity in the 1970s, while others argue that fascinators were worn during the day and cocktail hats in the late afternoon or evening. Unlike a fascinator, a cocktail hat has a fully formed and visible base.

Cocktail hats can be of many shapes, ranging from modeled wool or felt or shaped straw to softer, turban-like constructions.

== See also ==
- Cocktail dress
- List of hat styles

Similar women's hats:

- Half hat
- Bicycle clip hat
- Fascinator
- Doll hat
