= Papa and Nicole =

Motor vehicle advertising characters

- Renault character
- First appearance: 1991
- Last appearance: 1998

"Papa" and "Nicole" were fictional characters created to advertise the Renault Clio in the United Kingdom between 1991 and 1998. The "Papa!" "Nicole" and "Nicole!" "Papa" verbal exchanges between Nicole and her father during the advertisements were adapted from an exchange between Nicole Bonnet and her father (played by Audrey Hepburn and Hugh Griffith respectively) in the film How to Steal a Million from 1966.

Surveys by Channel 4 and ITV revealed the series as the most popular car advertisements ever aired in Britain. In 1996, one survey found that Nicole was recognised by more Britons than Prime Minister John Major, Bob Hoskins or Chris Evans. Renault was found to be the most persuasive advertiser in five European countries in 1994. The advert was designed by the Publicis advertising agency.

== Cast ==
- Nicole – Estelle Skornik
- Papa – Max Douchin
- The Groom, Unnamed – Vic Reeves
- Bob – Bob Mortimer

Professional driver Penny Mallory did the driving for the commercials.

== Episodes ==
1. Très intéressant ("Interesting"), 1991
2. Le rendez-vous ("The Meeting"), 1992
3. Le ski ("Skiing"), 1993
4. Transformation ("Transformation"), 1994
5. Maman ("Mum"), 1995
6. Le changement ("Moved On"), 1996
7. Vies parallèles ("Parallel Lives"), 1997
8. Le mariage ("The Wedding"), 1998

== Finale ==
An all new second generation Renault Clio was launched in March 1998, and with it came the finale of Nicole's Provençale story.

Much publicity and speculation surrounded the question of whom Nicole would marry. Socialite and It girl Tara Palmer-Tomkinson noted, "I can't understand what she is doing getting married. I mean, she is giving up everything. She is one of the most beautiful, stunning, eligible girls around. She must be off her rocker. I mean, she had everything going for her, driving around the country in her Renault Clio, all at Daddy's, or rather Papa's, expense. I should be so lucky."

The finale was itself a spoof of the film The Graduate. Wearing a dress by Deborah Milner and a hairstyle by Nicky Clarke, with her ring designed by Stephen Webster, Nicole was led up the aisle to the as yet unseen groom. The advert played during the advertising break for Coronation Street on 29 May 1998; an estimated 23 million viewers watched Nicole leave Vic Reeves at the altar and start a new life with Bob Mortimer in his new Renault Clio. The advert was also screened extensively during the 1998 FIFA World Cup. Reeves and Mortimer had previously referenced the adverts in their 'Le Corbussier et Papin' sketches from The Smell of Reeves and Mortimer.

== Soundtrack ==
All but one of the advertisements used Renault's 1980s to 1990s signature tune, Robert Palmer's "Johnny and Mary". Each used a variation of the song, including Martin Taylor's acoustic interpretation, an alternative version of which he released on his album Spirit of Django and Renault's promotional compilation, Miles More Music. The advert that did not use "Johnny and Mary" was Le Changement (Moved On) from 1996, where the song by Soul II Soul, "Keep On Movin'", was used. In the advert Le Ski (Skiing), from 1993, the tune by Sam Fonteyn, "Pop Looks Bach" (better known as the theme tune for Ski Sunday), was used in addition to "Johnny and Mary".

== In popular culture ==
- The £350 dress worn in the first advertisement inspired a copy sold for under £40 at Selfridges.
- The comedy duo Smith and Jones parodied the advertisements in a sketch showing "Papa" kerb crawling looking for a prostitute, and accidentally attempting to hire the services of a girl who turns out to be "Nicole". The sketch was written by Martin Curtis (Brown).
- A mid 1990s British Rail advertisement for Intercity trains used lookalikes of Nicole and Papa in a humorous pastiche. "Papa's" train travelling companion wonders who the young lady is and remarks, "I thought you weren't married."
- In pre publicity for Series 8 of the BBC One science fiction series Doctor Who, Peter Capaldi, newly cast as the latest incarnation of The Doctor and at 56 the oldest incumbent to the role, indicated that there were no plans for his version of the Doctor to flirt with the Doctor's twenty seven-year old companion Clara Oswald, as had occurred during the tenure of the previous Doctor actor, Matt Smith. In explaining the rationale in interviews and press conferences, Capaldi said he wished to avoid any "Papa and Nicole moments".
- In the series Derry Girls of 2018, the character Orla hopes that if the girls make it to Paris for the school trip she can meet Nicole. Erin scoffs that Nicole is not real, and neither is Papa!

== Sources ==
- Clio TV stars mark the public launch of new Clio Renaultsport 197, easier.com, July 2006
- CAP Online, Nicole? Papa!, Autumn 1995
- CAP Online, Nicole and Papa: a 1990s retrospective, 1999
- BBC, Motor show move struggles to create spark, July 2006
- Nicole and Bob: the inside story, The Birmingham Magazine, Number 10 October 1998
