= Lainey Keogh =

Irish fashion designer

- Born: 1957 (age 68–69); Oldtown, County Dublin, Ireland
- Website: http://www.laineykeogh.com

Lainey Keogh (born 1957) is an Irish fashion designer specialising in knitwear.

== Early life ==
Born in 1957 in Oldtown, County Dublin, Ireland, Keogh grew up on a farm. She studied microbiology, and started out as a lab technician before deciding to pursue fashion design as a career. At this time, Marianne Gunn O'Connor, who had a clothes shop in Dublin called Otokio specialising in avant-garde fashion, noticed Keogh knitting in the Bewley's coffee house in Dublin, and is credited with discovering her and her work. Following Otokio's closure in 1991, Gunn O'Connor would go on to take charge of international PR for Keogh's company, before finding success as a literary agent.

== Career ==
In 1984 Keogh opened her first shop in Dublin, where she gradually built up her business and reputation, before presenting her first major catwalk show in Autumn 1997 at London Fashion Week. Despite breaking all the traditional rules, including having personal friends (including Marianne Faithfull and Sophie Dahl, making her catwalk debut) modelling alongside famous supermodels such as Naomi Campbell and Helena Christensen, the show, held in a working man's club, was very well received. The soundtrack to the show included unreleased tracks by U2, while John Hurt recited poetry by Seamus Heaney. Anna Harvey of UK Vogue declared Keogh's show the "jewel in the crown" of that Fashion Week. That same year, Isabella Blow chose a Keogh knitted evening dress and coat ensemble as part of the 1997 Dress of the Year alongside designs by Hussein Chalayan, Julien MacDonald, Deborah Milner, and Philip Treacy. The following year, Keogh's textiles were used by John Galliano in his 1998 Autumn haute couture collection at Christian Dior S.A.

Although an enthusiastic proponent of new technology in the late 1990s, Keogh decided in 2001 to focus on ethically sourced, natural fibres and dyes, and exclude synthetics and chemicals from her work. She also decided to make an effort to preserve traditional Irish weaving and knitting techniques by insisting that her clothes be handmade by local individuals, rather than mass-produced. She is an active supporter of charities and international women's rights, and in 2001, she was donating twenty per cent of her sales to a different charity each month. Since 2001, she has regularly held fund-raising shows for, and donated percentages of her income to charitable organisations such as the Chernobyl Children's Project, earthquake relief in India, and the Society of Saint Vincent de Paul.

== In popular culture ==
Throughout her career Lainey Keogh has often been name-checked in contemporary popular fiction by authors such as Sheila O'Flanagan (Far From Over, 2008), Kate Thompson (Striking Poses, 2003), Cathy Kelly (Woman to Woman, 2011; and Always and Forever, 2007), and Paul Howard (The Oh My God Delusion, 2010).

In 2010 Keogh was one of six contemporary, internationally renowned Irish fashion designers featured on a set of Irish postage stamps issued by An Post. The other designers featured were Paul Costelloe, Louise Kennedy, John Rocha, Philip Treacy and Orla Kiely.
