= Paul Costelloe =

Irish fashion designer (1945–2025)

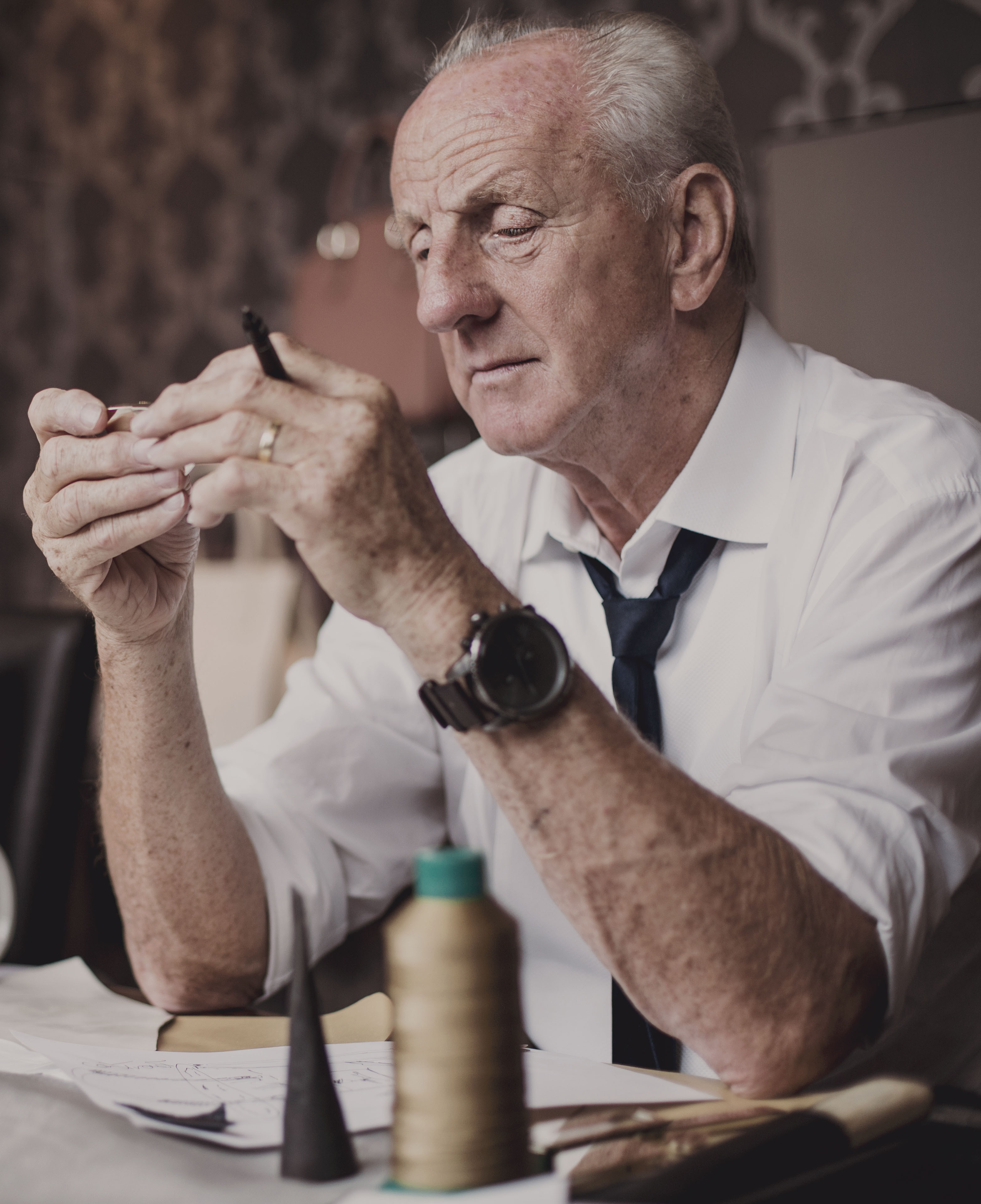
- Costelloe in 2015
- Born: 23 June 1945; Dublin, Ireland
- Died: 21 November 2025 (aged 80); London, England
- Occupations: International Fashion Designer; Artist
- Years active: 1979–2025
- Known for: Paul Costelloe
- Spouse: Anne Cooper (m. 1979)
- Children: 7
- Website: paulcostelloe.com

Paul Costelloe (23 June 1945 – 21 November 2025) was an Irish fashion designer and artist. After studying at the Grafton Academy of Fashion Design, he worked in Milan, Paris, New York and London. He set up his own label, Paul Costelloe Collections, in 1979. He was personal designer to Diana, Princess of Wales, from 1983 until her death in 1997. From the 2000s, his designs were sold by Dunnes Stores in Ireland.

== In popular culture ==
In 2010, Costelloe was one of six contemporary Irish fashion designers featured on a set of Irish postage stamps issued by An Post. The other designers featured were Louise Kennedy, Lainey Keogh, John Rocha, Philip Treacy and Orla Kiely. Along with Kennedy, he was a celebrity guest judge for the 2013 final of RTÉ Television's Craft Master show.

== Death ==
Costelloe died in London on 21 November 2025, at the age of 80.

== See also ==
- List of people on the postage stamps of Ireland
