= Orla Kiely =

Irish fashion designer (born 1962)

- Born: 24 May 1962 (age 63)
- Education: Royal College of Art (MA)
- Occupation: Fashion designer
- Spouse: Dermott Rowan
- Children: 2
- Awards: Irish Tatler Woman of the Year; UK Fashion Export Awards (twice); UK Fashion Export Gold Award
- Website: www.orlakiely.com

Orla Kiely, OBE (born 24 May 1962) is an Irish fashion designer based in London. She began her career designing hats, and moved on to design work on handbags and a variety of other items including kitchenware and cars. She received a master's degree from the Royal College of Art. She worked with several companies before setting up her own business.

Kiely Rowan PLC, the retail and wholesale entity operating the fashion business under Kiely's name, ceased trading on 17 September 2018 but has continued selling through its distribution partners.

== Biography ==
Kiely credits her grandmother with being the creative influence in her life. Her father was an accountant; her mother studied science before being forced to give up work by her employers after she married.

Kiely was educated at Loreto College, Foxrock. She qualified as a textile designer at the National College of Art and Design in Dublin and moved to New York to work for a wallpaper and fabric designer. She moved to England to work for Esprit while studying for a master's degree at the Royal College of Art in London, primarily in knitwear. In her exit show at the RCA, she displayed a range of hats which were purchased by Harrods. She did design work for Marks & Spencer and Habitat.

She began designing handbags and hats after her father noted during her first London Fashion Week that everyone was carrying a handbag, but no one was wearing a hat. In the late 1990s, she had the idea to laminate cloth for handbags: "At the time, no one was doing anything like it. Laminated fabric, in those days, meant tablecloths."

Together with her husband, Dermott Rowan, she formed The Orla Kiely Partnership in 1997. Her husband explained in an interview, "Nothing was planned, the whole thing started by accident. Kiely was consulting for other companies and designing her own collection at the weekend, which she would give to me to organize. We had this chaotic situation where deliveries of her designs would come into our apartment and if I didn't get them out by 5 pm, there was nowhere to sit!" Kiely showed in London Fashion Week and secured her first export orders. The following year, they took the collection to Premiere Class.

She has been awarded the title of Visiting Professor of Textiles at the Royal College of Art and was made a Senior Fellow in 2016.

In June 2014, Kiely was awarded an honorary degree from the University for the Creative Arts. In 2015, Kiely was made an Honorary Fellow of the British Institute of Design. She also was made an Honorary Doctor of Norwich University of the Arts.

== Design work ==
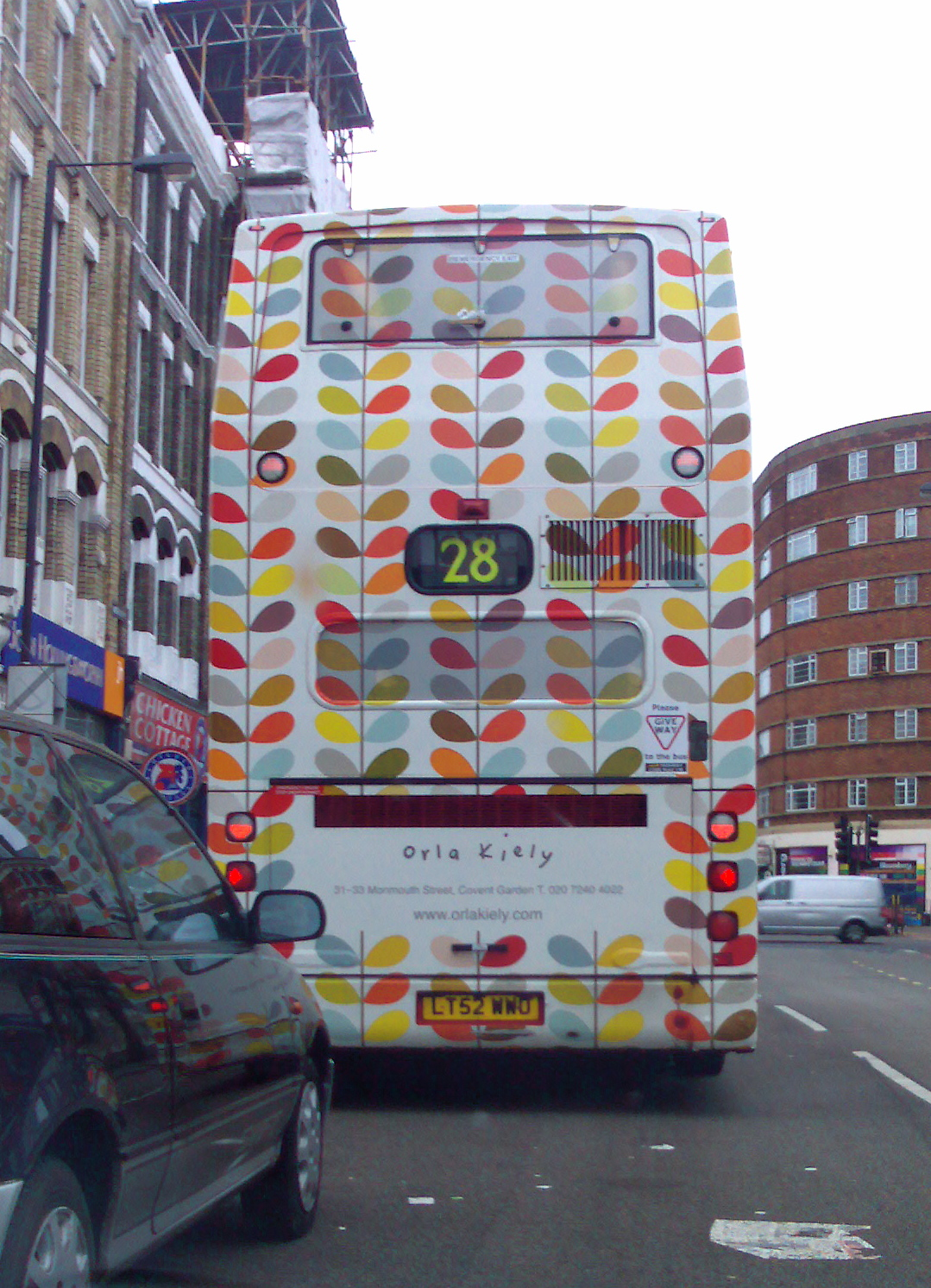
Kiely design work on the back of a London bus

Kiely has been described by The Guardian as "the Queen of Prints." Her designs have been used for a variety of objects, including kitchenware, stationery, furniture, wallpaper, a range of Citroën DS3 cars, and Pure Evoke Mio radios.

She has also designed a refillable water bottle called the "Wottle", which is a collaboration with the water filter company Brita. The bottle features her green-stem design and is made from high-density polyethylene, a recyclable plastic material, and produced by a company in Suffolk.

Her business operates out of a studio in Pimlico, London.

She has completed two publications entitled Home and Pattern, both published by Conran Octopus. She released a third publication, A Life in Pattern, in early 2018 to coincide with her exhibition at the Fashion and Textile Museum in May.

== Personal life ==
Kiely is married to Dermott Rowan; they have two sons.

== In popular culture ==
In July 2010 Kiely was one of six contemporary, internationally renowned Irish fashion designers featured on a set of Irish postage stamps issued by An Post. The other designers featured were Paul Costelloe, Louise Kennedy, John Rocha, Philip Treacy and Lainey Keogh. Kiely's stamp was an 82c stamp bearing her name in large orange letters at the top along with an image of a handbag with her leaf design against a white background.

Her fashion line has been worn by Catherine, Duchess of Cambridge, and celebrities including Kirsten Dunst and Alexa Chung.

== Bibliography ==
- Pattern. London: Conran Octopus. 2010. ISBN 978-1-84091-553-2.
- Home. London: Conran. 2013. ISBN 978-1-84091-618-8.

== See also ==
- List of people on the postage stamps of Ireland
