= Estelle Skornik =

French actress (born 1971)

- Born: 4 July 1971 (age 54); Paris, France

Estelle Skornik (born 4 July 1971 in Paris) is a French actress, known in the United Kingdom for playing "Nicole" alongside Max Douchin ("Papa") in a range of Renault Clio advertisements.

== Family ==
Her ancestors were Polish Jews, and her grandfather was killed trying to escape from Auschwitz.

== Career ==
Her theatre debut was with the Francis Huster Company, at the same times as the actresses Valérie Crunchant, Christiana Reali, Clotilde Courau and Valentine Varela. She has subsequently devoted her career more to cinema and notably appeared in Prise au piège (director: Jérôme Enrico) with Lucia Sanchez and Nils Tavernier.

In the United Kingdom she is most notable for playing "Nicole" alongside Max Douchin ("Papa") in a range of Renault Clio advertisements; the last was in May 1998 and featured the comedians Vic Reeves and Bob Mortimer. It has been said that she was unable to drive when the advertisements were made. However, she has stated that this is untrue.

She also played in the theatre, in the production Home Truths at the Devonshire Park Theatre, Eastbourne, United Kingdom, between 19 and 24 May 1997.

=== Television ===
- 1991–1998 Papa & Nicole (Renault Clio adverts)
- 1993 Les Maîtres du pain (dir: Hervé Baslé)
- 1995 Porté disparu (dir: Jacques Richard)
- 1999 Prise au piège (dir: Jérôme Enrico)
- 1999 Hornblower (dir: Andrew Grieve) as Mariette
- 1997 Le Baiser sous la cloche (dir: Emmanuel Gust)
- 2004 Maigret and the Shadow Puppet (L’Ombre Chinoise) as Nine Moinard
- 2009 Le Chasseur (dir: Nicolas Cuche)
- 2009 Ce jour-là tout a changé (dir: Arnaud Sélignac) as Queen Marie-Antoinette
- 2009 R.I.S, police scientifique

=== Film ===
- 1992 Albert souffre (dir: Bruno Nuytten )
- 1993 La Mal Aimée (dir: Bertrand Arthuys)
- 1997 Marquise (dir: Véra Belmont) as Marie
- 1999 Les Parasites, (dir: Philippe de Chauveron)
- 2000 Virilité et autres sentiments modernes (dir: Ronan Girre)
- 2001 L'Amour absent (dir: Christian Louis-Vital)
- 2001 From Hell (dir: Albert Hughes) as Ada
- 2010 L'Evasion de Louis XVI (dir: Frédéric Fougea) as Marie Antoinette
- 2011 Les Lyonnais (dir: Olivier Marchal)

=== Theatre ===
- 1995 : Le Misanthrope by Molière, directed by Francis Huster
