= Philip Treacy =

Irish-born haute couture milliner

Philip Treacy OBE
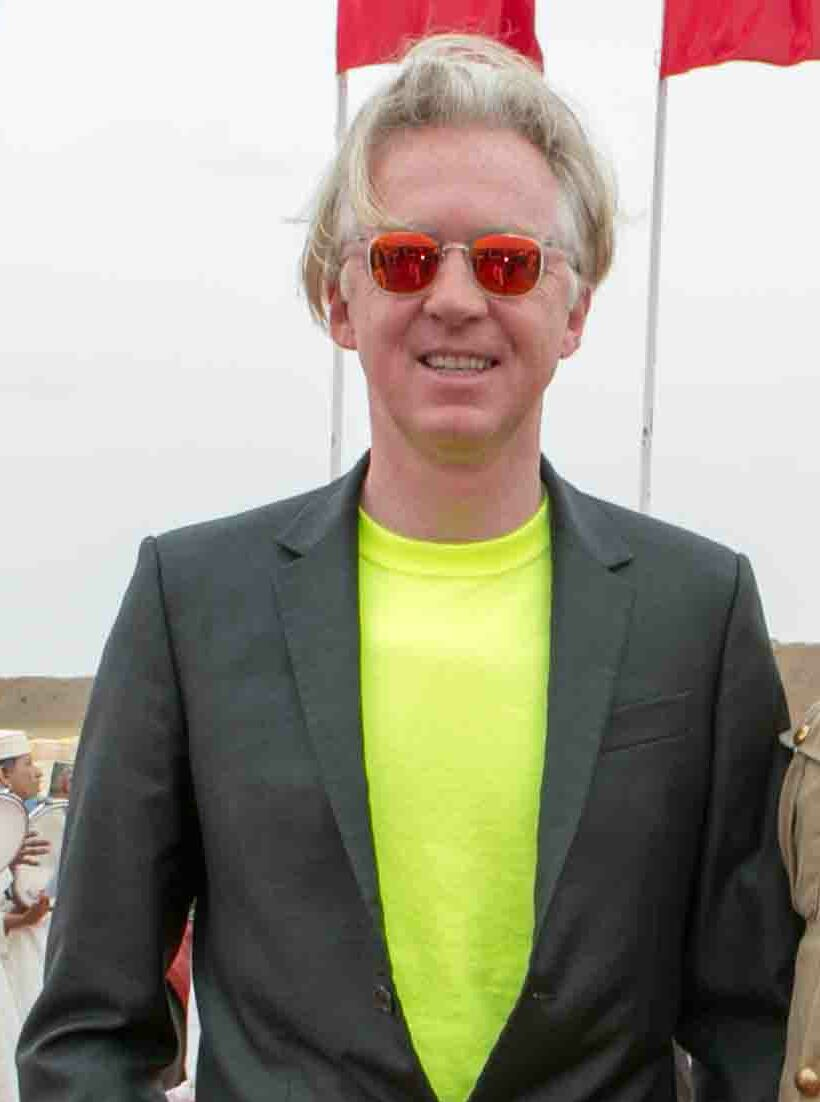
- Treacy at British Polo Day Morocco 2014
- Born: 26 May 1967 (age 59); Ahascragh, Galway, Ireland
- Education: National College of Art and Design (NCAD) Dublin, (1987)
- Alma mater: Royal College of Art London, (MA, 1990)
- Occupations: Milliner, hat designer, (Note: Treacy prefers to use the term "hat designer".) designer
- Spouse: Stefan Bartlett (m. 2017)
- Awards: British Accessory Designer of the Year (1991, 1992, 1993, 1996, 1997); International Designer of the Year (China Fashion Week, Shanghai, 2004); Doctorate of Fine Arts University College Dublin (2006); Order of the British Empire (OBE) (2007)
- Website: philiptreacy.co.uk

Philip Anthony Treacy (born 26 May 1967) is an Irish haute couture milliner, or hat designer, who has been mostly based in London for his career, and who was described by Vogue magazine as "perhaps the greatest living milliner". In 2000, Treacy became the first milliner in eighty years to be invited to exhibit at the Paris haute couture fashion shows. He has won British Accessory Designer of the Year at the British Fashion Awards five times, and has received public honours in both Britain and Ireland. His designs have been displayed at the Victoria and Albert Museum and the Metropolitan Museum of Art.

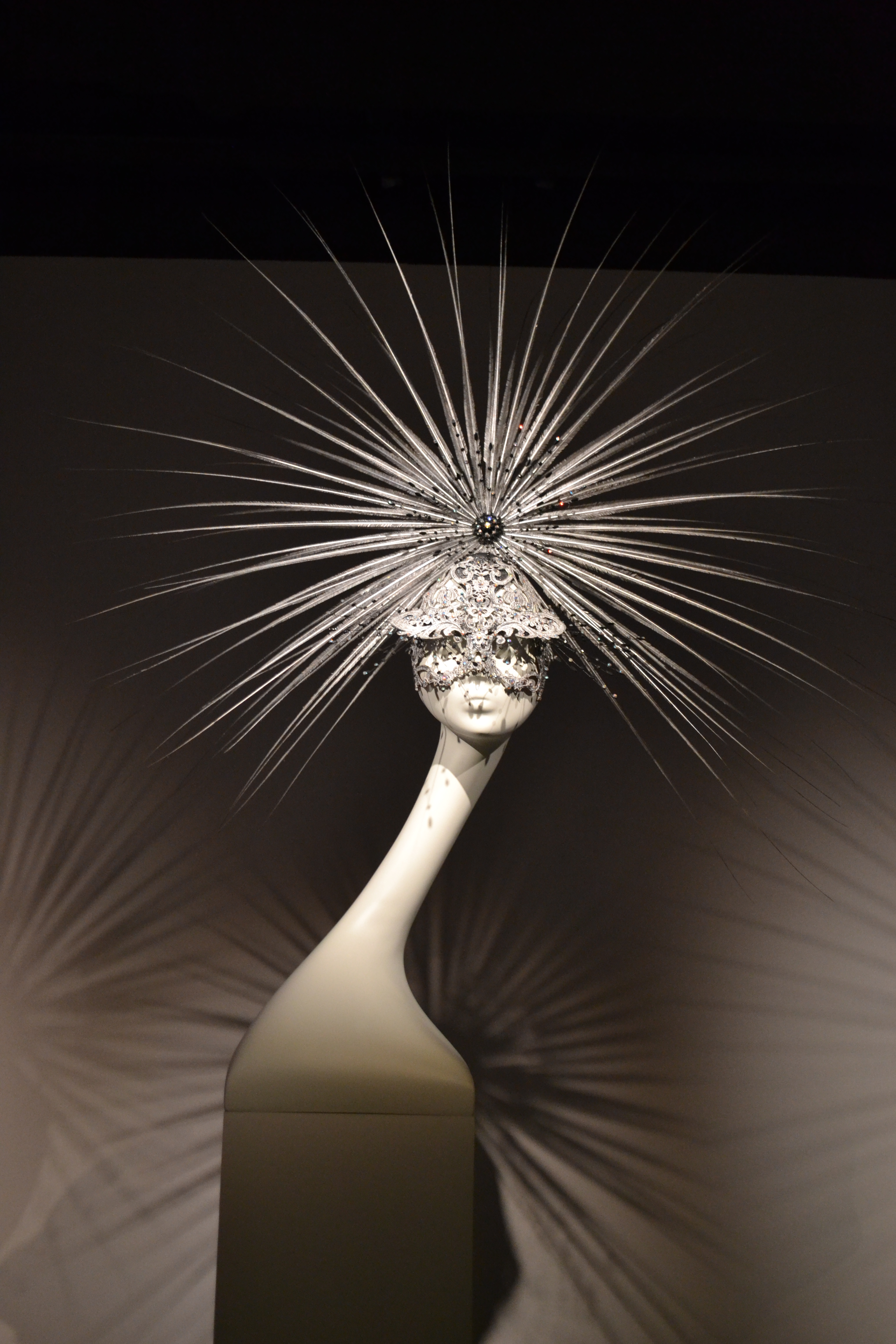
Philip Treacy at Erarta museum in Saint Petersburg

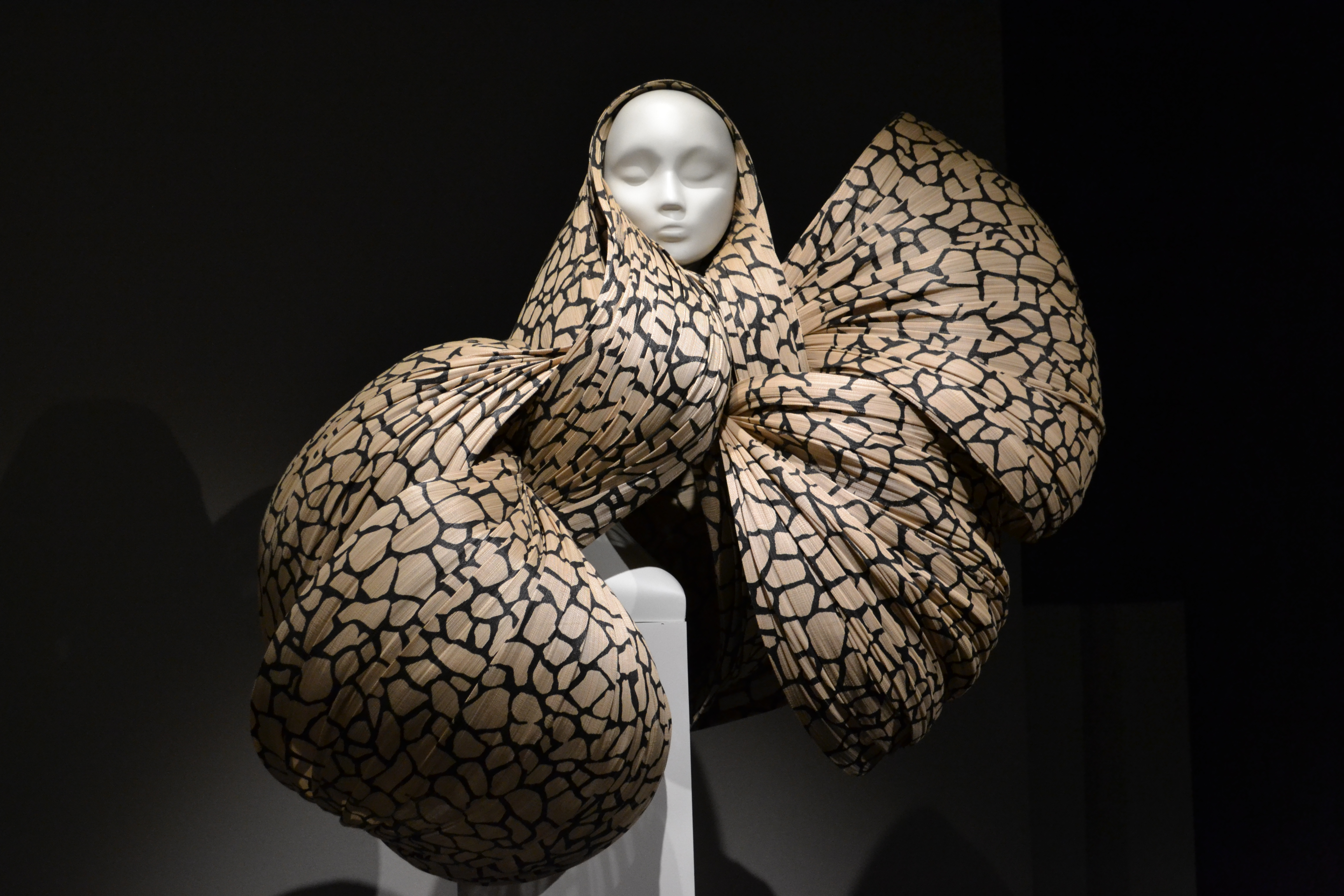
another piece from St. Petersburg exhibition

In 1989, Treacy was discovered and then mentored by fashion editor Isabella Blow, whom Treacy described as the "biggest inspiration" on his life. Blow would wear and promote Treacy's designs at important fashion events and helped Treacy to break into some of the main fashion houses, particularly Chanel and Givenchy. Treacy is associated with celebrities such as Lady Gaga, Madonna, and Sarah Jessica Parker. He has been associated with British royalty and has designed hats for royal occasions, including the fascinator (or "pretzel hat") worn by Princess Beatrice in 2011. In 2024, Treacy was granted a royal warrant by Queen Camilla.

== Early life ==
Philip Anthony Treacy was born on 26 May 1967 in the small village of Ahascragh, near Ballinasloe, in County Galway in the Republic of Ireland, whose population was circa 500. Treacy says that his interest in sewing started at age five, and that his obsession with the weddings in the Catholic church across the road from his house inspired an early passion for fashion. In 1985, at age 17, Treacy moved to Dublin to study fashion at the National College of Art and Design, where he spent a six-week work experience with British milliner Stephen Jones, and graduated in 1987. In 1988, Treacy won an MA scholarship for the Fashion Design course at the Royal College of Art in London, and graduated in 1990 with first class honours.

When I was interviewed [for the Royal College of Art] I didn’t know whether to play down the hats or play up the hats, but they were thinking of setting up a hat course so I became their guinea pig. After one day there I said to my tutor Sheilagh Brown: “What should I do? Should I make hats or clothes?’ She said: ‘make hats.’ It was very practical, not a great revelation.

— Philip Treacy, Irish Independent, February 2011

In 1989, he took one of his hats to Michael Roberts, fashion editor of Tatler magazine, and his style editor Isabella Blow. Blow asked Treacy to make a hat for her wedding, and soon after in 1990, invited him to live with her and her new husband Detmar Blow, in their Belgravia home in London, where Treacy worked in their basement. Alexander McQueen, another Blow discovery, also shared her Belgravia home.

In July 2002, the Design Museum in London, hosted an exhibition of the 30 most iconic hats Treacy had designed for Blow, titled: When Philip met Isabella. The exhibition was so well received that it went on a world tour for several years and drew an attendance of circa 43,000 when shown in Dublin in 2005. In a 2011 interview, The Daily Telegraph said: "She made him famous. He made her look like an icon. When you think of the late, great Blow, you think of her in one of his creations, be it a giant disc or a replica sailing ship."

My biggest inspiration has been Isabella Blow. ... In twenty years I have met all my heroes and for me nobody has surpassed her. She was incredible. I thought there must be others like her, but there wasn't. Everyone was boring in comparison to her.

— Philip Treacy, Irish Independent, February 2011

== Career ==
=== Haute couture ===
In 1991, aged 23, Treacy got his "big break" when asked by Karl Lagerfeld to come to the Chanel showrooms in Paris for what was to be the start of a long-term working relationship; the meeting was held on the prompting of Blow. The first hat that Treacy designed for Chanel appeared on the cover of British Vogue worn by model Linda Evangelista; the hat was called Twisted Birdcage and was photographed by French fashion photographer, Patrick Demarchelier. (Note: Treacy chose another Linda Evangelista photograph as the cover of his 2015 biography.)

I was 23 and I'd just left [art] school, I didn't know whether to call him Mr. Lagerfeld or whatever. I was totally intimidated but Issie [Blow] was exactly herself. She just walked into the house of Chanel and said: "We'd like some tea please". I would design hats for Chanel for the next decade.

— Philip Treacy, Irish Independent, February 2011

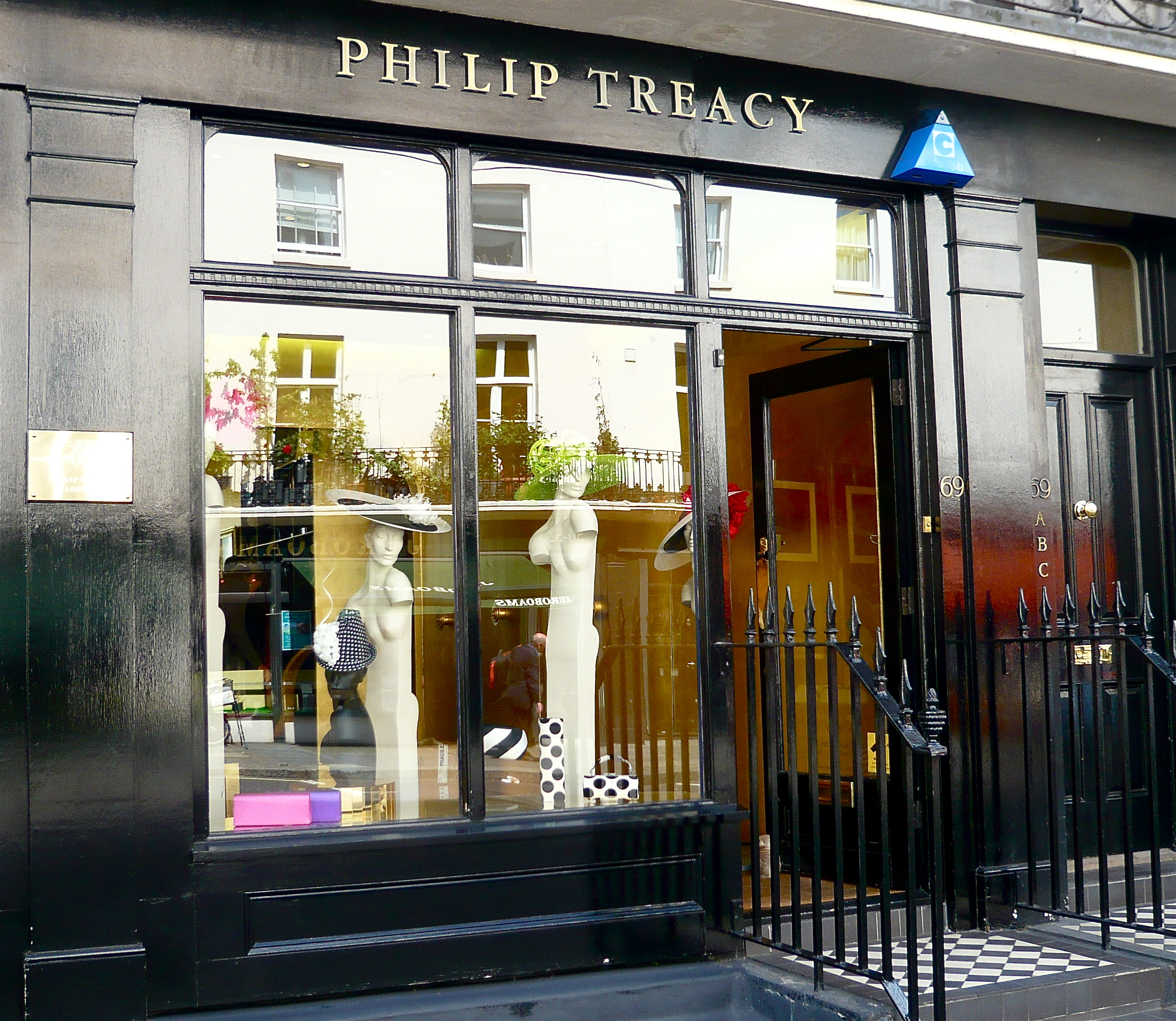
Philip Treacy's boutique, 69 Elizabeth Street, Belgravia, London

In 1991, Treacy opened his first showroom in London (pictured), and won the first of five British Accessory Designer of the Year awards. Two years later, Treacy held his first fashion show during London Fashion Week in Harvey Nichols, with Naomi Campbell, Yasmin Le Bon, Kate Moss, Christy Turlington and Stella Tennant modelling in return for keeping Treacy's hats, all of which were black. In 1994, he opened up his boutique at 69 Elizabeth Street, in Belgravia, London, next door to Isabella Blow's residence at number 67.

Treacy's first solo show in 1993 saw him debut on the fashion and celebrity radar when no fewer than five of the most famous supermodels of the era – Naomi Campbell, Yasmin Le Bon, Kate Moss, Stella Tennant, and Christy Turlington – appeared on his catwalk. Playing down his star appeal, Treacy is humble about his overnight success story. "London was in a lull then," he said. "The media went crazy when all those girls did my show, but it completely changed perceptions of the hat.

— Philip Treacy, The Sydney Morning Herald, 2007

Treacy has designed hats for Alexander McQueen (another discovery of Isabella Blow), (Note: For McQueen's first Givenchy exhibition in 1997, Blow had the horns cut from a ram in her flock of rare-breed sheep, which Treacy then sprayed with gold, and which Naomi Campbell then wore on the runway.) including his 1999 white collection for Givenchy in Paris, for Karl Lagerfeld at Chanel, and for Valentino, Ralph Lauren, Donna Karan, Versace and Rifat Ozbek. In January 2000, he became the first milliner for eighty years to be invited to exhibit at the Paris shows. (Note: Treacy exhibited his Orchid Collection at the Paris 2000 haute couture shows.) In November 2015, Vogue magazine ran a feature of Treacy's 20 "most awe-inspiring chapeaux" from the runways.

=== Wider fashion ===
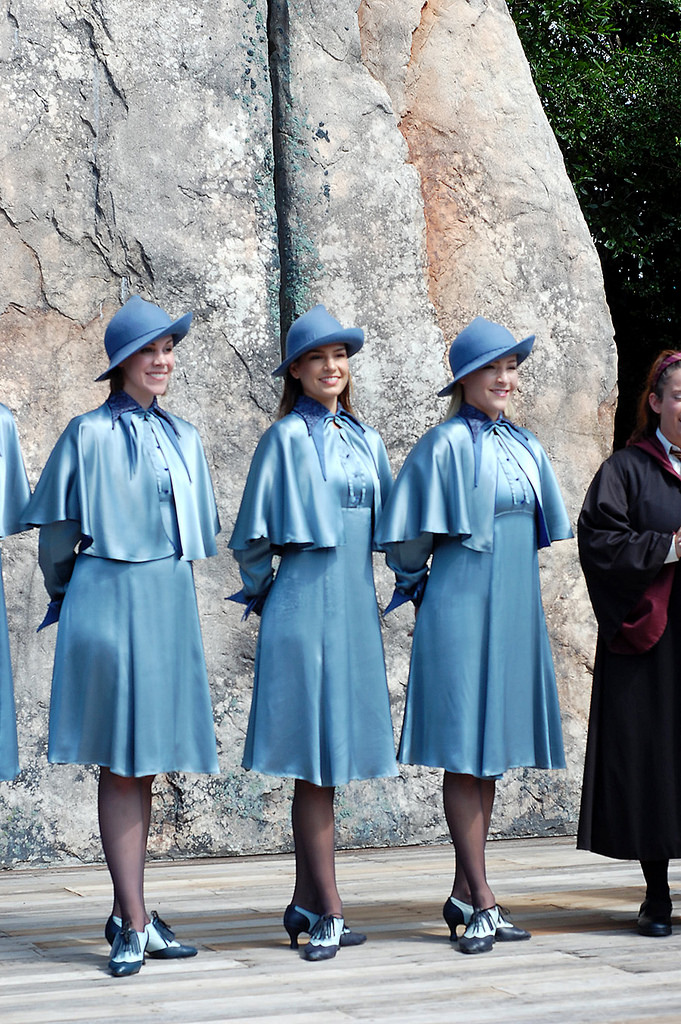
Treacy designed the Beauxbatons hats for Harry Potter and the Goblet of Fire.

Treacy has designed hats for films, including the Harry Potter film series, and most notably the Beauxbatons hat for Harry Potter and the Goblet of Fire in 2005. Sarah Jessica Parker has worn his hats at Sex and the City premieres (2008, 2011), and Met Galas (2013, 2015). (Note: Sarah Jessica Parker's 2015 Met Gala Treacy hat was nominated by Vogue in May 2018, as one of the 16 Craziest Celebrity Moments in Met Gala History.) Treacy designed Madonna's gold headpiece for her 2012 Super Bowl XLVI halftime show. Lady Gaga described Treacy as "the greatest milliner of all time", while hosting his 2012 London Week fashion show. Notable designs for Lady Gaga include a telephone-shaped headpiece with a removable handset hat, worn for her appearance on Friday Night with Jonathan Ross in 2010 (now in permanent display at Madame Tussauds), and a lightning-bolt hat she wore for the 52nd Annual Grammy Awards.

As well as Isabella Blow, Sarah Jessica Parker, and Lady Gaga, notable muses for Treacy's hats are socialite Daphne Guinness, model Naomi Campbell, and singer, and model, Grace Jones, who used Treacy as art director and designer for her 2009 The Hurricane Tour.

In a July 2011 interview with The Guardian, Treacy distilled what he felt a hat should do (a Treacy quote which is often reproduced):

The Guardian: Does a person carry off a hat or a hat carry off a person?
Philip Treacy: A person carries off the hat. Hats are about emotion. It is all about how it makes you feel. I like hats that make the heart beat faster.

— Philip Treacy, The Guardian, July 2011

Treacy had previously written a piece for The Guardian in May 2001 on what defines the "perfect hat".

=== Royal occasions ===
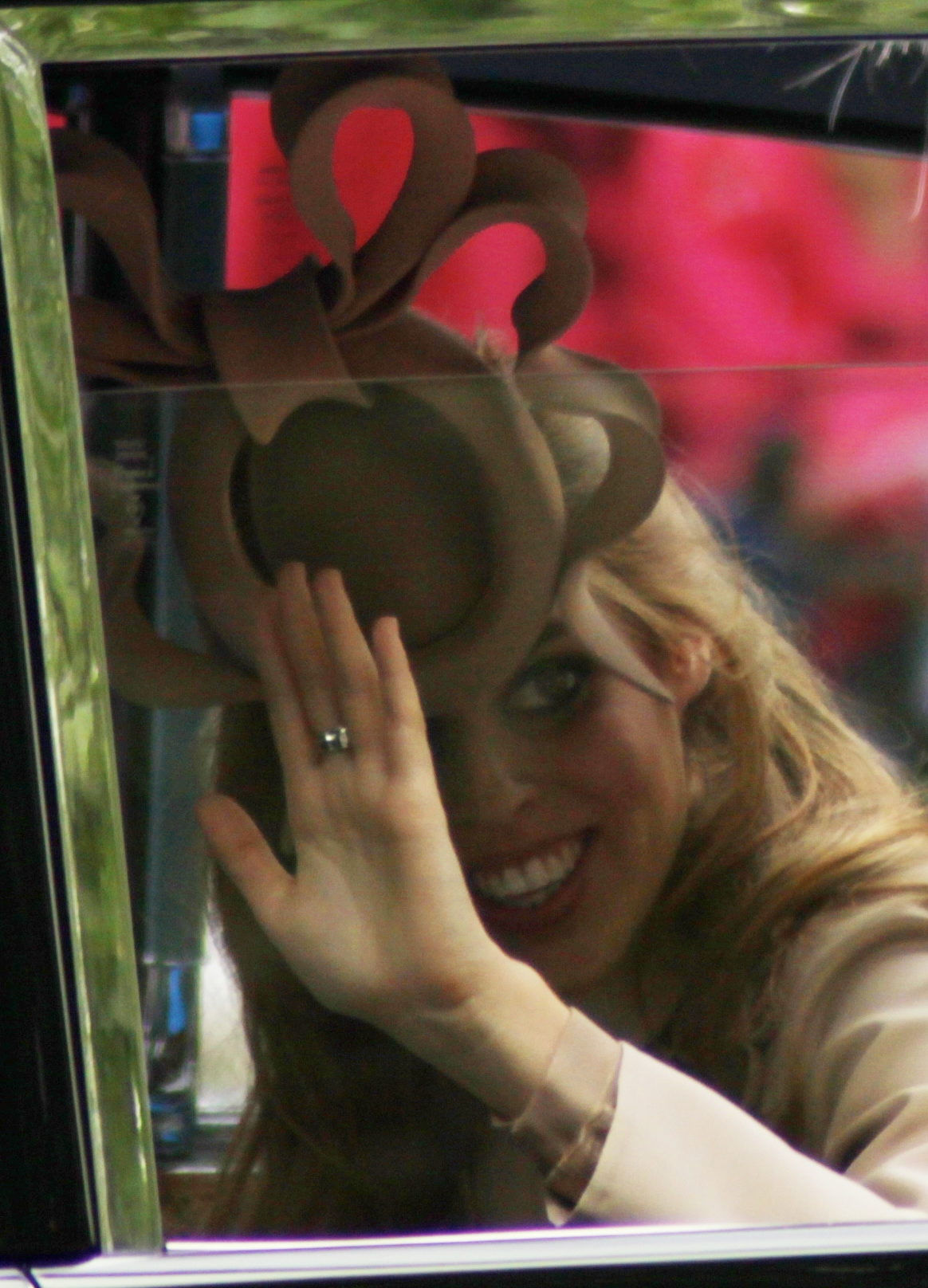
Princess Beatrice's fascinator "pretzel hat" by Philip Treacy in April 2011

An illustration of Philip Treacy's fascinator worn by Princess Beatrice

Treacy's hats are also associated with English royalty, with thirty-seven worn at the wedding of Prince William and Catherine Middleton, including the controversial fascinator-style hat worn by Princess Beatrice of York (pictured). This so-called "pretzel hat" was auctioned for charity by Princess Beatrice on eBay for $130,000 (£80,100) on 22 May 2011. Treacy felt the criticism regarding the "pretzel hat" was extreme (the hat had its own Facebook page with over 140,000 connections), and in July 2011 said: "In the future, we'll look back and think she looked wild". In a July 2018 Desert Island Discs interview on BBC Radio 4, Treacy said of the backlash to his design: "There was a moment where I thought I would find myself with my head on a spike outside the Tower of London". The hat is stored at the Metropolitan Museum of Art.

Treacy designed over twenty hats that were worn at the 19 May 2018 wedding of Prince Harry and Meghan Markle, including by Camilla, Duchess of Cornwall, by Catherine, Duchess of Cambridge, and by Oprah Winfrey. Meghan, Duchess of Sussex, chose a Treacy hat for her first official royal event in December 2017.

In July 2018, Treacy credited the patronage of Elizabeth II with "single-handedly saving the British hat industry".

In 2023, Treacy created the caps of maintenance for the three crowns used in the coronation of Charles III and Camilla.

== Awards ==
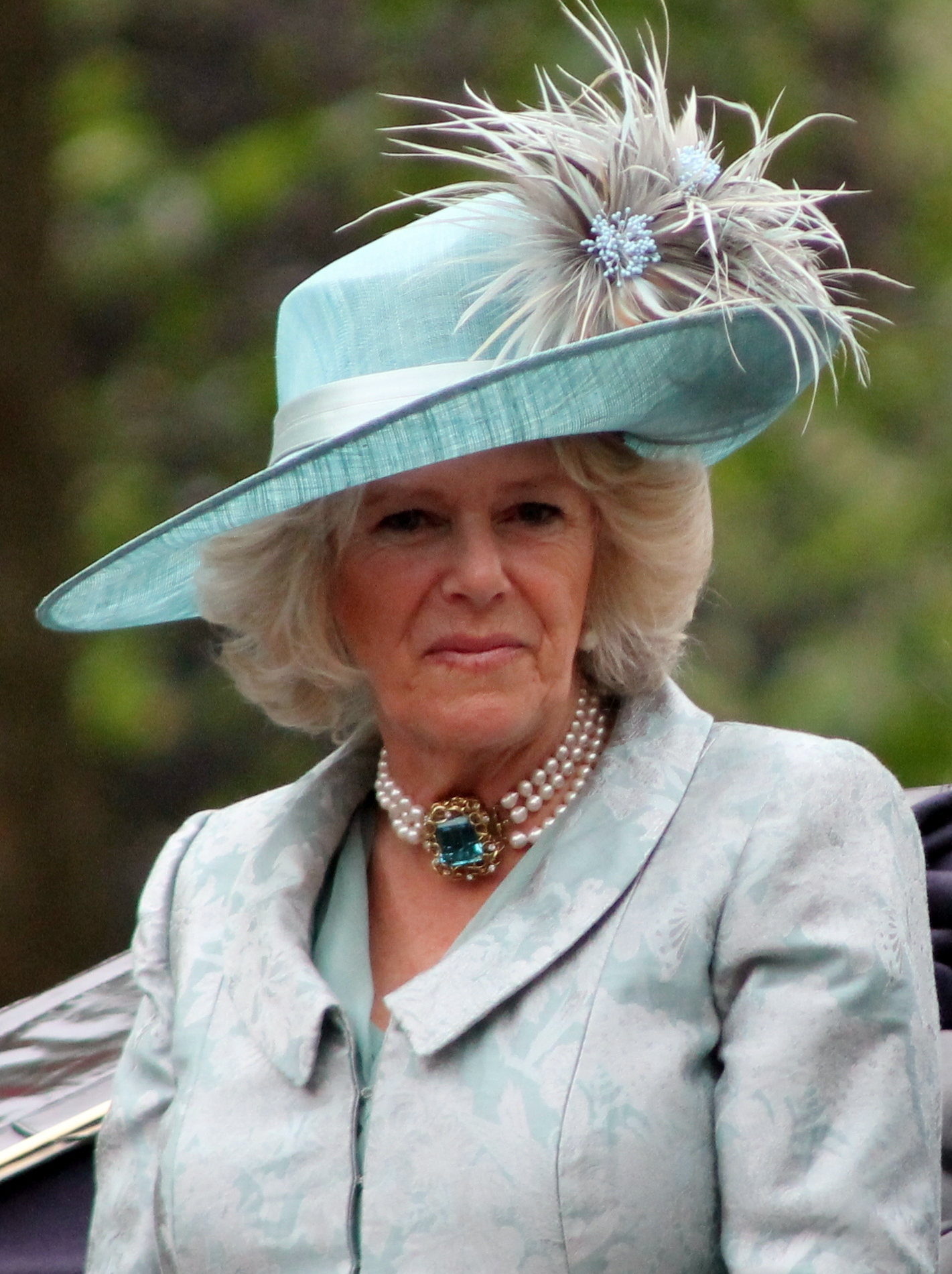
Camilla, Duchess of Cornwall, wearing a Treacy hat in June 2012

Treacy won the title of British Accessory Designer of the Year at the British Fashion Awards five times during the 1990s (1991, 1992, 1993, 1996 and 1997). In January 2000, Treacy was invited by the Chambre Syndicale de la Haute Couture to participate in Paris fashion shows, the first milliner to be invited in 80 years. In November 2004, Treacy was named the International Designer of the Year, at the China Fashion Awards in Shanghai. Treacy's hats have been exhibited, and are housed in the collections of design museums including the Victoria and Albert Museum, the Metropolitan Museum of Art, and the Galleria del Costume of the Palazzo Pitti in Florence. Vogue magazine has described Treacy, on several occasions, as being one of the greatest milliners in the world.

Treacy has also been recognized outside of the world of fashion. In April 2006, he was awarded a Doctorate of Fine Arts, by the National University of Ireland at University College Dublin. He was awarded an honorary OBE (Order of the British Empire) for services to the British fashion industry by Prince Charles and Camilla, Duchess of Cornwall at a special ceremony in Clarence House in November 2007. (Note: Because Treacy is Irish, and not sworn to allegiance to the Crown, the ceremony was not held with the Queen in Buckingham Palace. Normally, in such cases, a Government Minister would perform the ceremony, however, Prince Charles intervened to host the ceremony in Clarence House.) Treacy designed the headdress worn by the Duchess of Cornwall for the couple's wedding. In July 2010, Treacy was one of six contemporary and internationally renowned Irish fashion designers honoured by a set of Irish postage stamps issued by An Post. The other designers were Paul Costelloe, Louise Kennedy, John Rocha, Lainey Keogh and Orla Kiely.

== Personal life ==
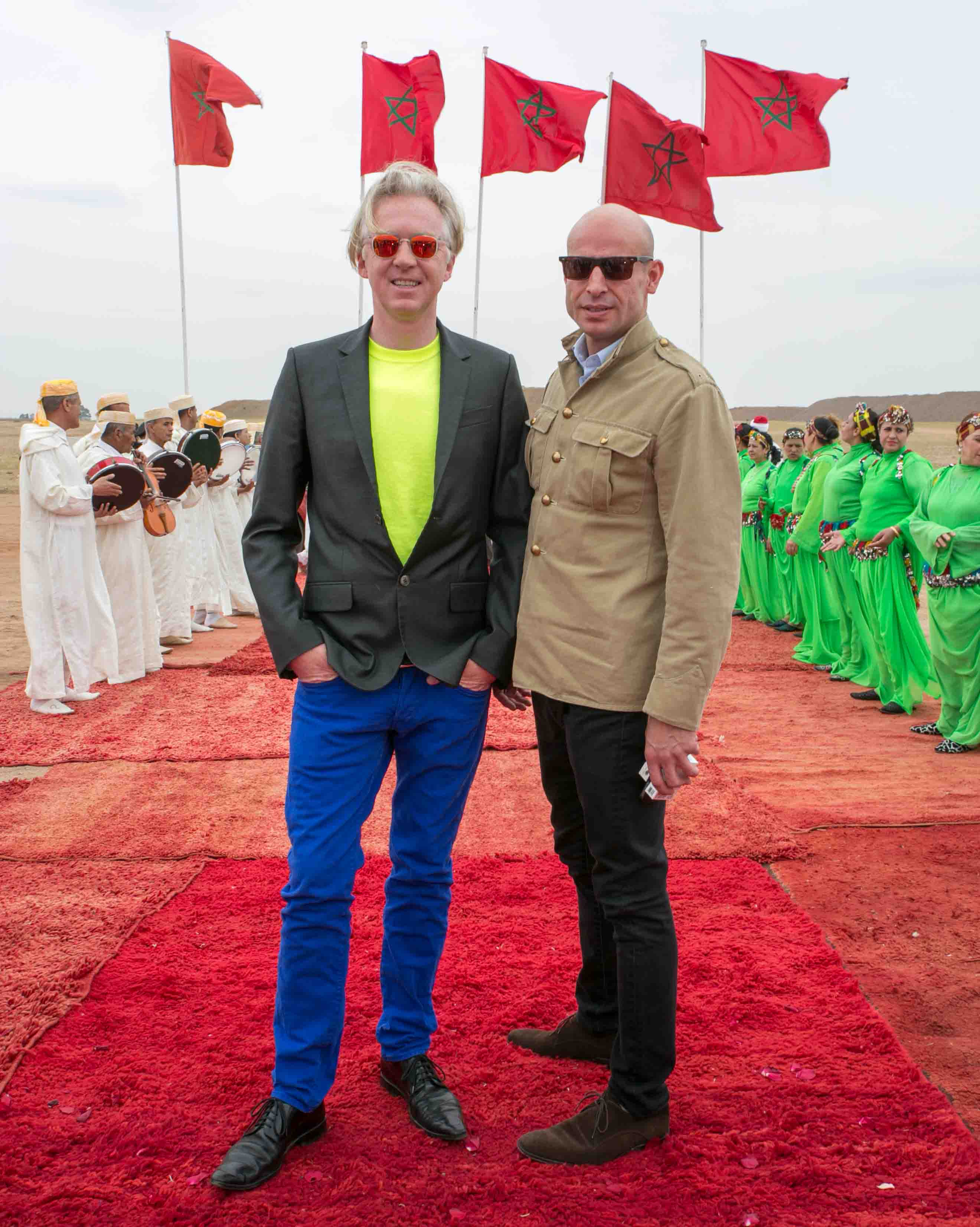
Treacy and Stefan Bartlett at British Polo Day Morocco 2014

Treacy is gay and in May 2017 he married his long-term partner of over 21 years, Stefan Bartlett, in a ceremony in Las Vegas. Treacy is the second youngest of a large family and has one sister, and seven brothers. He is particularly close to his sister, Marion Tubbing, the eldest sibling, whom he credits with supplying him with editions of Harper's and Queen and Vogue while living in Galway (Tubbing was working in London at the time), and to whom, along with his partner Bartlett, Treacy dedicated his 2015 biography: Philip Treacy: Hat Designer.

Treacy has also noted the support his parents gave him in pursuing his love of millinery, noting that his father would say: "whatever makes him happy". Treacy's father was a baker and his mother was a housewife, however, his father had a weak heart which prevented him from working as a full-time baker, and he eventually died when Treacy was age 11 from a heart attack; Treacy's mother died in 1993 when he was 25. Treacy called his friendship with his mentor, Isabella Blow, "an affair without sex". He has highlighted the importance of fashion model Grace Jones as a friend.

== See also ==
- John Boyd, milliner
- List of people on the postage stamps of Ireland
