= Bicycle clip hat =

Style of small hat or hat decoration

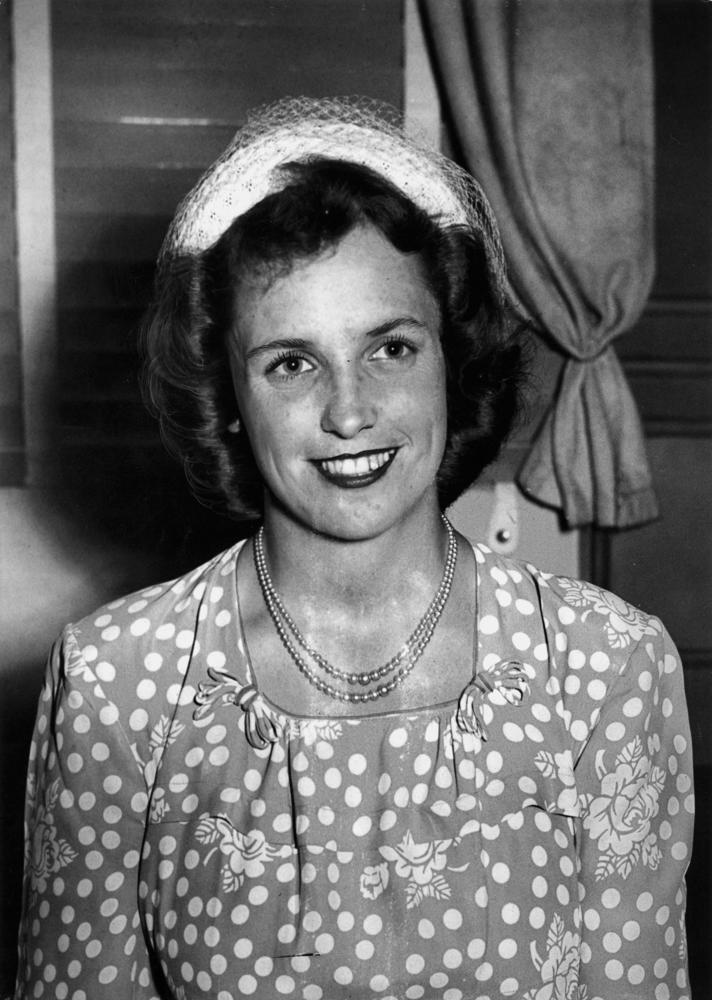
The bicycle clip hat was generally attached to the head using a metal spring.

A bicycle clip hat is a style of small hat or millinery decoration that includes a metal clip, similar to traditional designs used by cyclists, to hold it in place. It may be very similar to a half hat or fascinator in design, covering only part of the head.

The term has also been used to describe a design of headband that became popular in the 1950s and 1960s. This might be fabric attached to a piece of curved metal that held it firmly on the head.

In the 1950s, the bicycle clip design was also incorporated into designs of chignon caps – a fabric covering designed to cover a bun at the back of the head.

== See also ==
- List of hat styles
- Baseball cap
- Cap of maintenance
- Dutch cap
- Gandhi cap
- Halo hat
