= Bicycle clips =

Bicycle clips may refer to:

- Bicycle clip hat, a style of small hat that is held in place by a metal clip
- Trouser clips, small C-shaped pieces of thin metal worn around the ankle when cycling in trousers
- Pedal clips, an attachment that is shaped like the toe of a shoe that prevents a cyclist's shoe from slipping off the pedal
