= Juliet cap =

Headwear

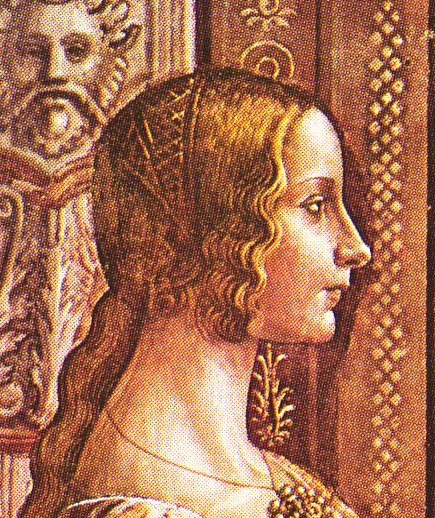
Fresco portrait of the teenage Ludovica Tornabuoni, late 1480s. Stretchy bias criss-cross between stiffer bands running from ear to ear

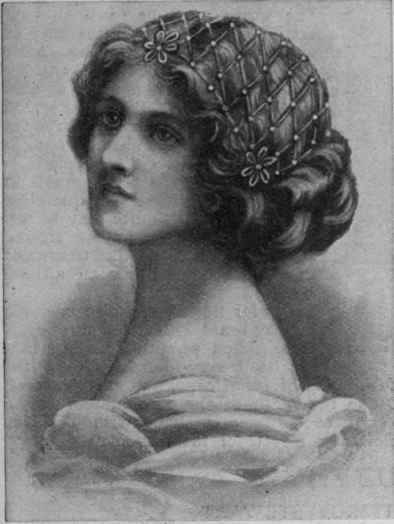
"A pretty and easily made Juliet cap in narrow gold braid and artistically coloured beads", from Every Woman's Encyclopaedia, 1910.

A Juliet cap is a small open-work crocheted or mesh cap, often decorated with pearls, beads, or jewels, and chiefly worn with evening gowns or as bridal wear. The cap is named after Juliet, the heroine of Shakespeare's Romeo and Juliet, who is sometimes portrayed wearing one.

An article in Every Woman's Encyclopaedia (London, 1910) suggested:

For evening wear a favourite and becoming adornment for the hair is a cap made after the fashion of that worn by the hapless heroine of the world's best known love story. Juliet caps hold their place as fashions come and go, and, although somewhat expensive trifles to buy may be made up by artistic and clever fingers at very little cost, and shaped to suit individual styles.

== See also ==
- List of hat styles
- Half hat
- Dutch cap
- Gandhi cap
- Cap of Maintenance
- Baseball cap
