= Half hat =

Style of headwear

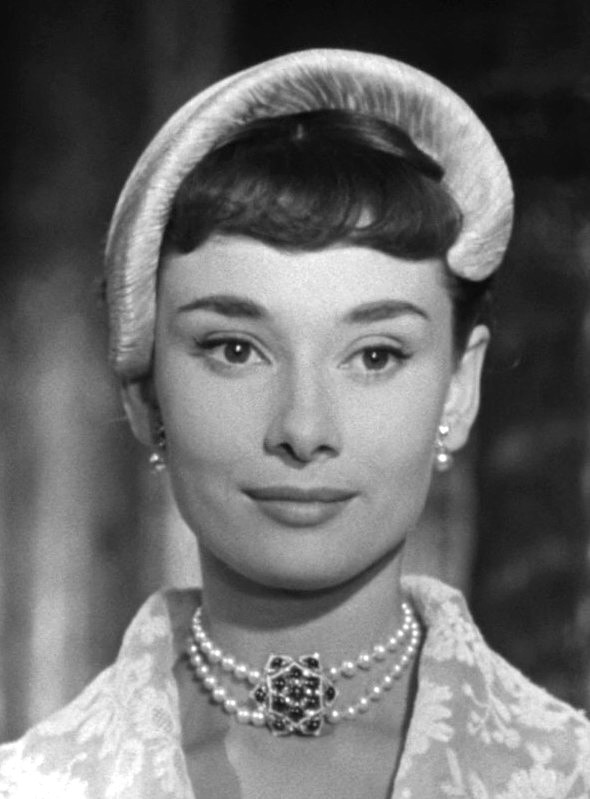
Audrey Hepburn wore a half-hat with a halo-effect brim in the 1953 film Roman Holiday

A half hat (also sometimes half-hat) is a millinery design in which the hat covers part of the head. Generally, the design is close-fitting, in the manner of the cloche, and frames the head, usually stopping just above the ears. It may be similar to a halo hat in the way that it frames the face and can be worn straight or at an angle.

The half-hat is said to have been created by the French-born and US-based milliner Lilly Daché, who won an award for the design in 1941.

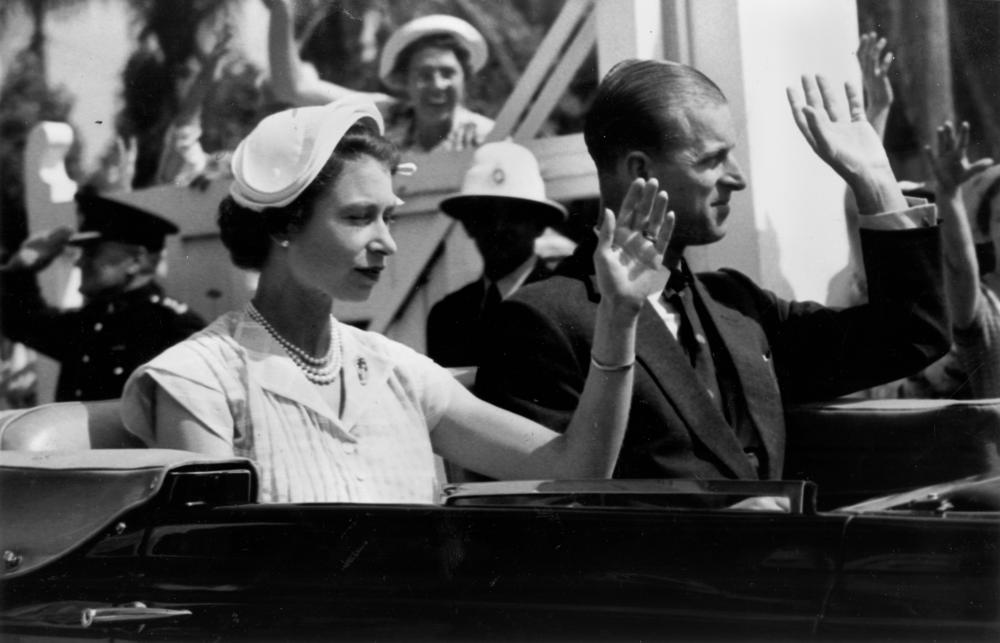
Elizabeth II wore a half hat during a 1954 visit to Queensland

== History and usage ==
The half hat became popular in the post-war period, especially in the 1950s. This was a design considered suitable for day and evening wear, and some designs included details such as sequins and veils. Designs were often stiffened to create a halo shape – a 1952 design from Ascot Millinery was made of decorated straw with an inner lining of velvet.

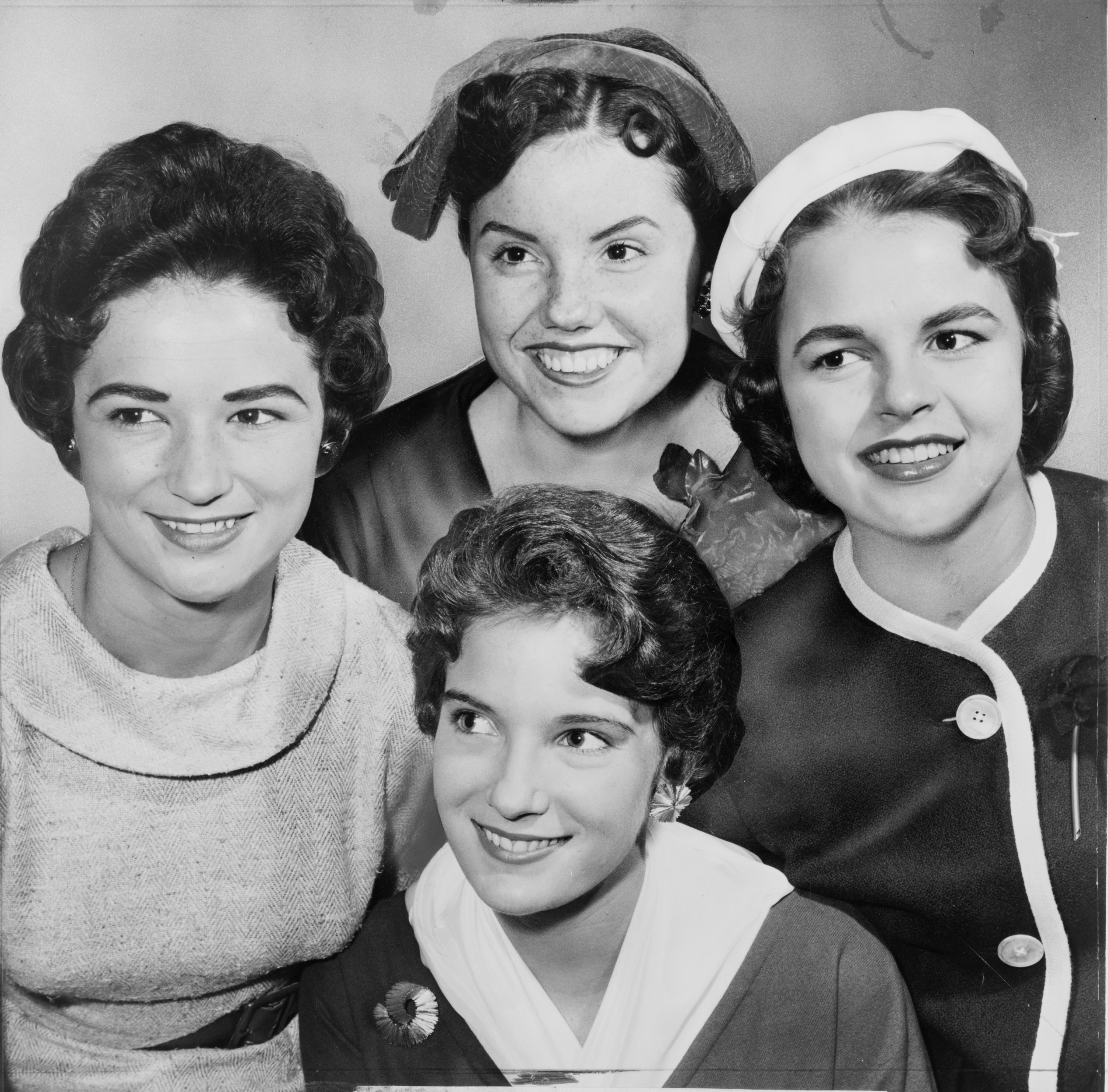
Four Miss America contestants in 1959, with two sporting fashionable half-hat designs

While many designs stopped a little way beyond the crown of the head, there was also a fashion for more bonnet-like shapes to half hats. Writing in The Guardian, also in 1952, fashion correspondent Phyllis Heathcote reported on the off-the-brow trend emerging from Paris, noting: "the majority of the hats are still very small, very soft, and very much alike, except – and this is important – that whereas last season and the one before the tendency was to an arched line over the front of the head, leaving the back uncovered, this season the movement tends to uncover the front and cover the back". Heathcote also noted the practicality of this shape, describing it as a design that could be folded up and stowed in a handbag or pocket. Such was its popularity in the United States – particularly when embellished – that a 1957 report in The Times on American hat fashions said: "The hat norm, godlike for Hera, is regal for American womanhood...the half-hat, usually jewelled, is plainly a diadem, sometimes secured by jewelled springs behind the head".

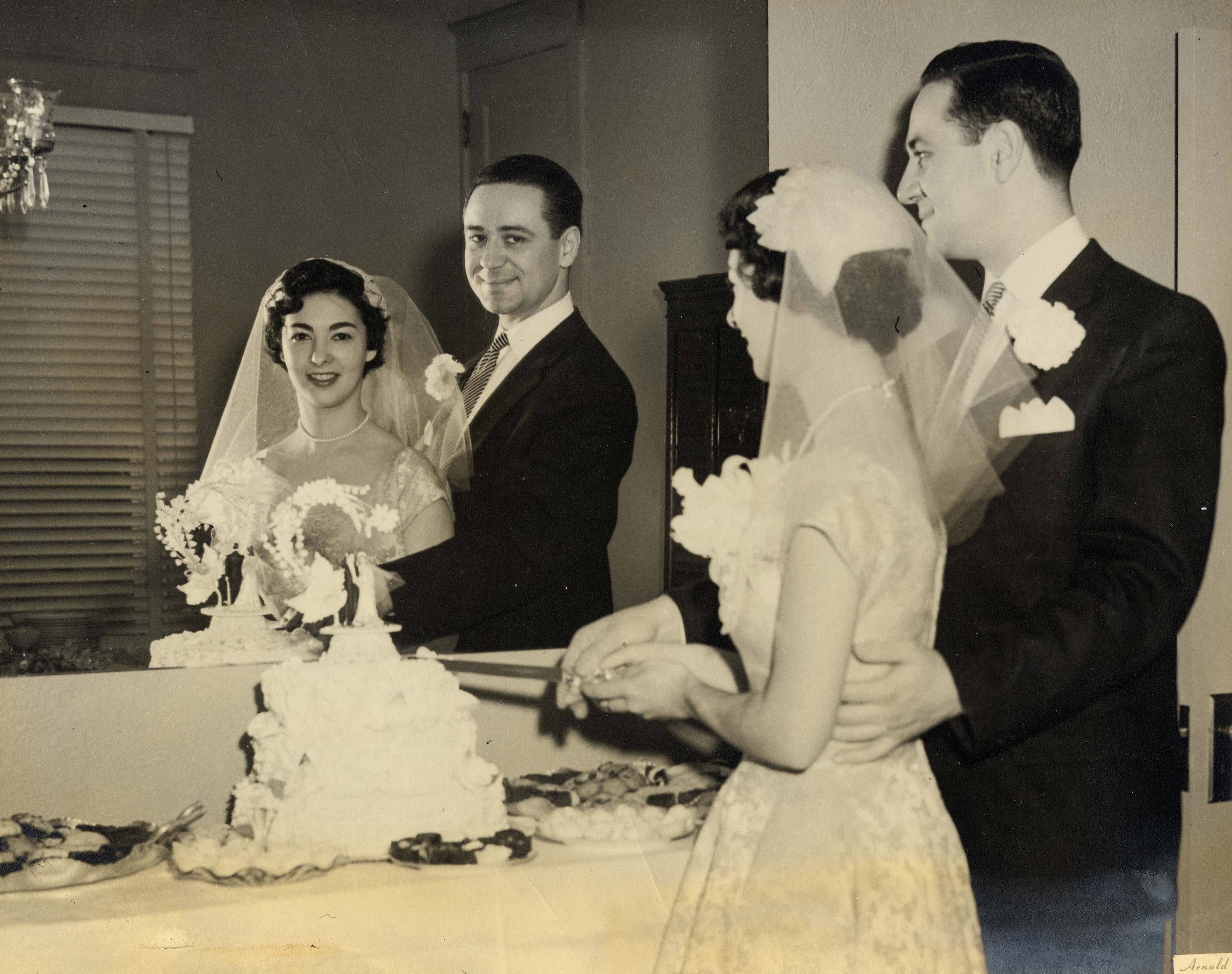
A 1955 half-hat design incorporated into a wedding veil

This was a hat design that became popular with brides. A 1955 wedding reported in The Times describes the bride wearing: "a beige lace dress of ballerina length with a high upturned collar and a half-hat to match trimmed with fine light-brown feathers".

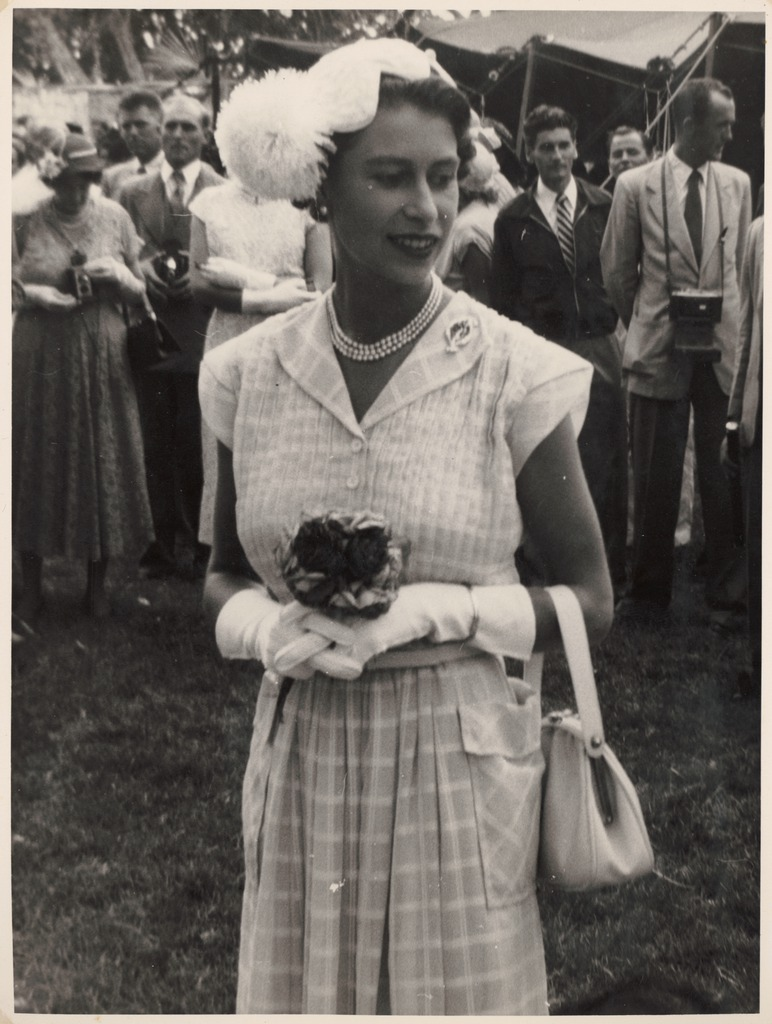
An example of the 'eggshell' half hat, also worn by Elizabeth II on her 1954 Australian tour, was trimmed with a pom-pom

=== Variations ===
The half hat could be shaped close to frame the skull in the manner of the Juliet cap (also known as a capulet) and some variations were known as the cape hat; typically in these designs draped fabric or felt was attached to a bicycle clip, creating a more scarf-like effect. Another variation is sometimes informally known as the 'cracked egg hat' or 'eggshell hat', due to its curved and irregular shape and is said to have been popularised by Givenchy and introduced by Dior. A design of this style worn by Queen Elizabeth during a 1954 tour of Australia had the addition of a pom-pom.

== See also ==
- List of hat styles
- Halo hat
- Bicycle clip hat
- Juliet cap
- Biretta
- Beret
- Dutch cap
- Cap
