= Kiss-me-quick hat =

British seaside novelty

A kiss-me-quick hat is a British seaside novelty hat, typically bearing the words "Kiss me quick" or "Kiss me quick, squeeze me slowly". Culturally, The Daily Telegraph describes them as "one step up from a knotted handkerchief".

== Rhyming slang and derivative terms ==
"Kiss me quick" has been used as rhyming slang for "prick". Also used as an -ism as in "kiss-me-kwik seaside towns." - describing "cheap, dated, seaside towns" according to Partridge.

== See also ==
- Buntal hat
- Breton (hat)
- Boater
- List of hat styles
- Panama hat
- Rock (confectionery)
- Sailor hat
- Straw hat
- Sun hat
