= Bumper brim =

Type of hat brim

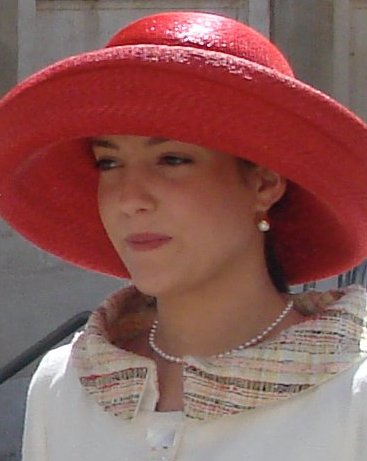
Princess Alexandra of Luxembourg wearing a bright red bumper brim hat in 2008

A bumper brim is a millinery feature in which the hat brim is tubular in design, making it a prominent feature of the hat. In order to achieve this effect, the brim may be rolled, stiffened or padded. A bumper brim can be added to a variety of hat designs, from small to large.

== History of the design ==
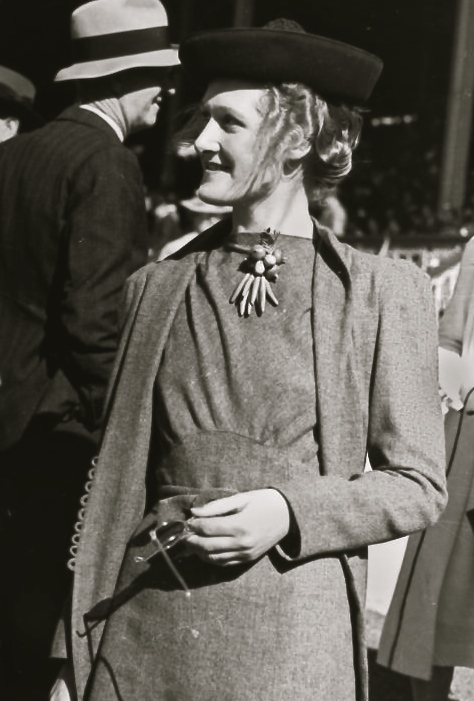
A bumper-brim design at Ascot Races, Brisbane, in 1939

The bumper brim was popular during the 1930s, when it was added to small hats, usually these were tilted well forward on the face. It could be incorporated into hats made of a variety of materials; a 1937 article in The Times describes a new trend in London for small summertime bumper brim hats, designed for street rather than beach wear, made of straw, grosgrain or felt.

In the same year, a Virginia Gardner article in the Chicago Tribune reported on key trends from Chicago designers and highlighted the bumper brim as the major innovation of the season. "'The new muffin hat', a buyer explained. 'It is exceeded in importance only by the new bumper brim'."

Bumper-brimmed designs also featured in the 1940s, when they were often worn well back on the head – often in the style of a halo hat – in order to frame the face. Millinery editor of Women's Wear Daily Maud G. Moody attended a 1946 fashion show in New York held by representatives of the French millinery industry – including Elsa Schiaparelli and Rose Descat – and described the most notable designs as including beret-type hats with bumper brims. She also highlighted a wide-brimmed padre hat, combining red crown with navy-blue bumper brim.

In the 1950s, hats with bumper brims were often worn square on, creating a wider profile.

=== Notable bumper brim hats ===
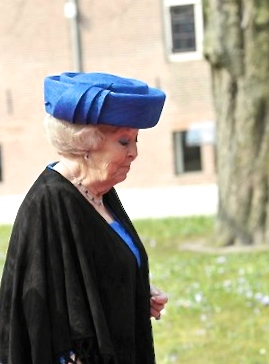
Beatrix of the Netherlands wore a blue bumper brim design in 2013 during a visit to Amsterdam by President Putin

Hillary Clinton wore a blue velour rolled-brim hat at Bill Clinton's 1993 Presidential Inauguration. The design, which was by Connecticut milliner Darcy Creech, attracted criticism. An article in The New York Times reported it was considered unflattering by fashion critics and some commentators considered it inappropriate to wear a hat once her jacket had been removed. An article originally published in The Times ahead of the 2009 inauguration of Barack Obama provided a run-through of previous fashion hits and misses among first ladies and noted that Hillary Clinton's headgear had become known as the "Oh-God-What-is-That? Hat".

Princess Beatrix of the Netherlands favours a bumper-brim style, wearing a blue version during a 2013 visit to Amsterdam with President Putin. She also wore a distinctive multiple-rimmed bumper design in black straw for the memorial service to Richard von Weizsaecker in February 2015.

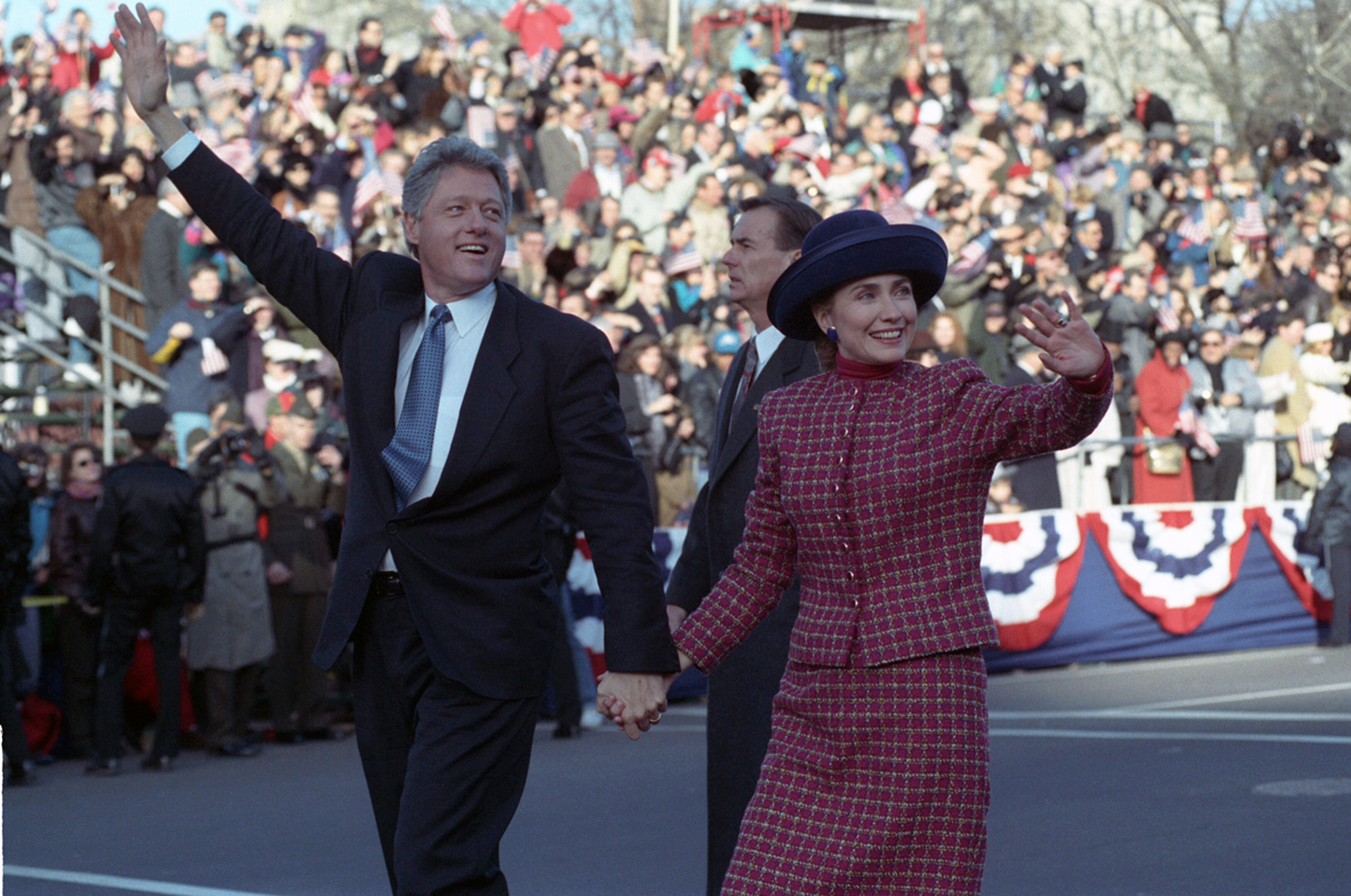
Hillary Clinton's bumper brim worn at the 1993 presidential inauguration – the so-called "Oh-God-What-is-That?" hat

== See also ==
- List of hat styles
- Halo hat
- Breton
