= Kiss Me Quick =

Kiss Me Quick or kiss-me-quick may refer to:

- Kiss Me Quick!, a 1964 film directed by Peter Perry
- "Kiss Me Quick" (Elvis Presley song), 1964
- "Kiss Me Quick" (Nathan Sykes song), 2015
- Kiss-me-quick hat
- "Kiss Me Quick", a song by Sam Beam and Jesca Hoop from the 2016 album Love Letter for Fire

Kiss-me-quick is a common name of several plants, including:

- Brunfelsia grandiflora
- Centranthus ruber
- Portulaca pilosa
