= Peach basket hat =

Hat design resembling a basket of fruit

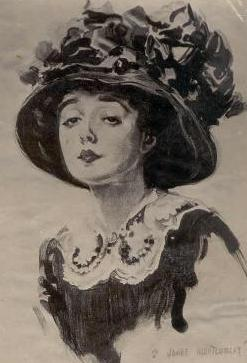
Actress Mabel Normand in a peach basket hat. Sketch by James Montgomery Flagg, 1909

A peach basket hat (sometimes called fruit basket hat) is a millinery design that resembles an upturned country basket of the style typically used to collect fruit. Generally it is made of straw or similar material and it often has a trimming of flowers and ribbons. Some models may also feature a veil or draped fabric covering. It was introduced in around 1908 and caused some controversy over the succeeding year due to its extreme dimensions and decorations. It had revivals – designs were at this stage more modest – in the 1930s and 1950s.

== History of the design ==
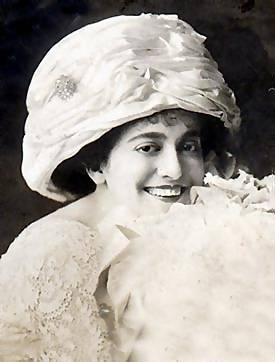
American singer Blossom Seeley in a peach basket style, 1912

The name peach basket hat became popularly used around 1908 in the United States. An advertisement in the Pittsburgh Gazette describes "the new Peach Basket Hats", also showing an illustration of a flower-decorated straw hat in the shape of a basket. While the term peach basket does not appear to have been used in the British fashion press, descriptions involving fruit baskets were. A 1908 comment piece in The Guardian by Evelyn Sharp described a variety of oversized designs, including one similar to Roundhead headgear, noting that they were: "hideously popular" and came trimmed with a variety of flower, fruit and bird motifs. Sharp added: "A basket of market produce pinned on the head would have much the same effect. For next to the difficulty of finding the head of the wearer underneath the hat of to-day comes the difficulty of finding hat shape under the trimming of to-day".

A 1907 article in the American edition of Vogue had predicted that the future of hats was: "in size colossal" and, two years on, the magazine suggested that the growing popularity of photography had inspired many of these new millinery designs, as couturiers were exposed to images from other cultures and countries. The inspiration for the peach basket millinery design was said to be the oversized styles worn by women of the Congo.

=== Controversy and ridicule ===
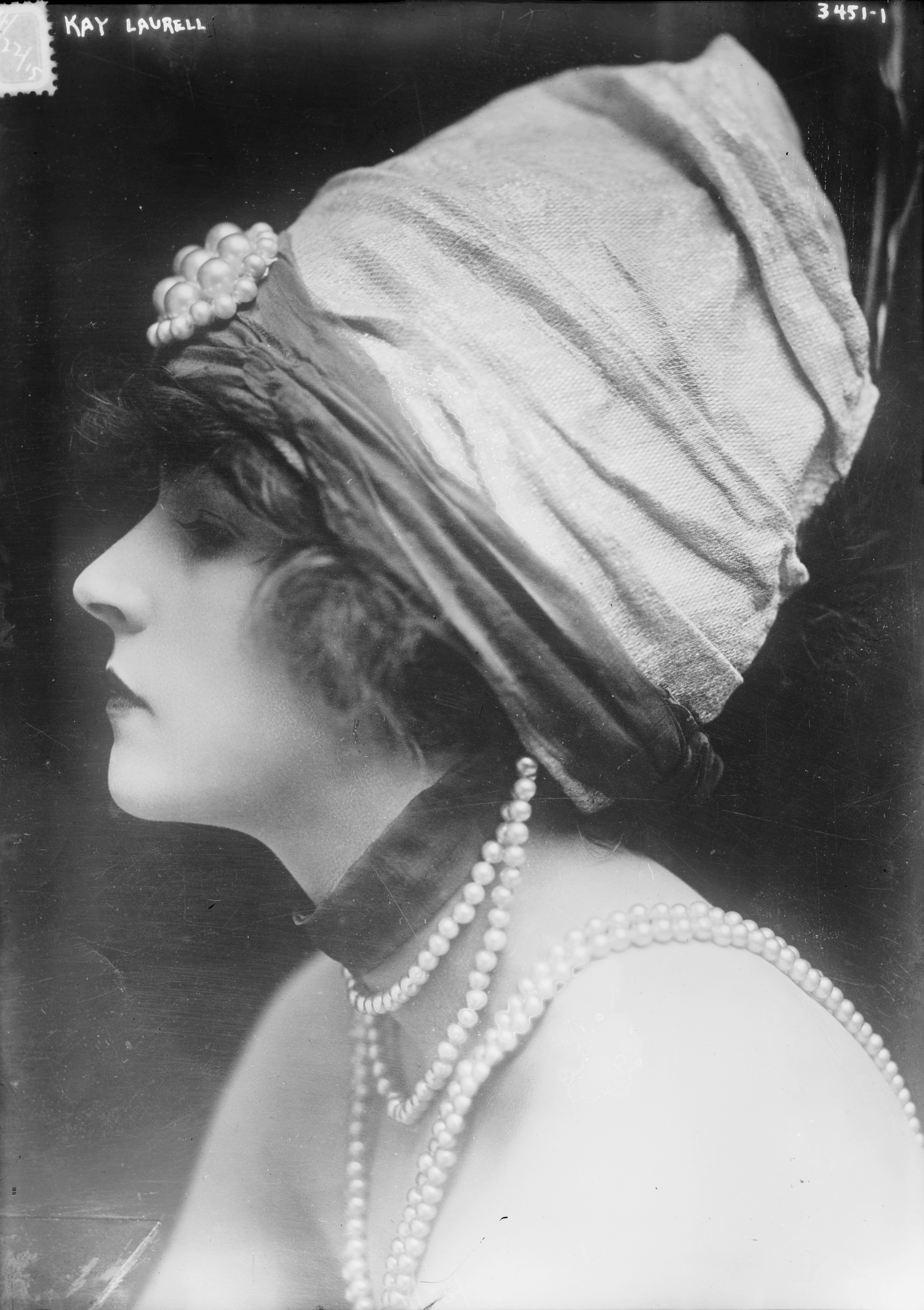
Kay Laurell in an unusual high-crowned and fabric draped variation on the peach basket, c. 1910

Although the peach basket was launched as one of the 1908 season's new looks, it was not greeted with universal acclaim. The Los Angeles Herald reported in 1909 that the US National Association of Retail Milliners had "launched the aeroplane as the new style of headgear, put a ban on the peach basket hat and decreed the three-cornered hat of the Louis XVI period as the stunning bonnet for the coming winter months". The milliners, who declared the peach basket (or fruit basket) dead, had suffered a poor season of sales. The association's president admitted: "The last season proved disastrous, short and unprofitable owing to the launching of extreme styles such as the fruit basket hat...a concerted effort has been made to tone down all attempts to introduce freak creations".

A further editorial in a New York newspaper said that husbands were partly responsible for the collapse in sales of the peach basket hat, with the manager of one Sea Cliff store reporting: "I have had no end of husbands come to the shop this spring in company with their wives to pick out their hats to prevent them from investing in a peach basket, washbasin or inverted bowl shape. Never before has so much fun been poked at millinery as this season".

In its favour, the peach basket was said to have saved a New York showgirl from disfigurement. Beginning with "Here's a kind word at last for the peach basket hat", an article in the Los Angeles Herald went on to describe how a car passenger thrown head first through a car windshield was saved because her substantial peach basket hat exited before her, thereby saving her from skinning her nose.

=== In popular culture ===
In 1909, the short comedy film Flossie's New Peach Basket Hat, produced by Sigmund Lubin, was released. In the same year, the song In a Peach Basket Hat Made for Two was composed by James M. Reilly and Henry W. Petrie.

== Later revivals ==
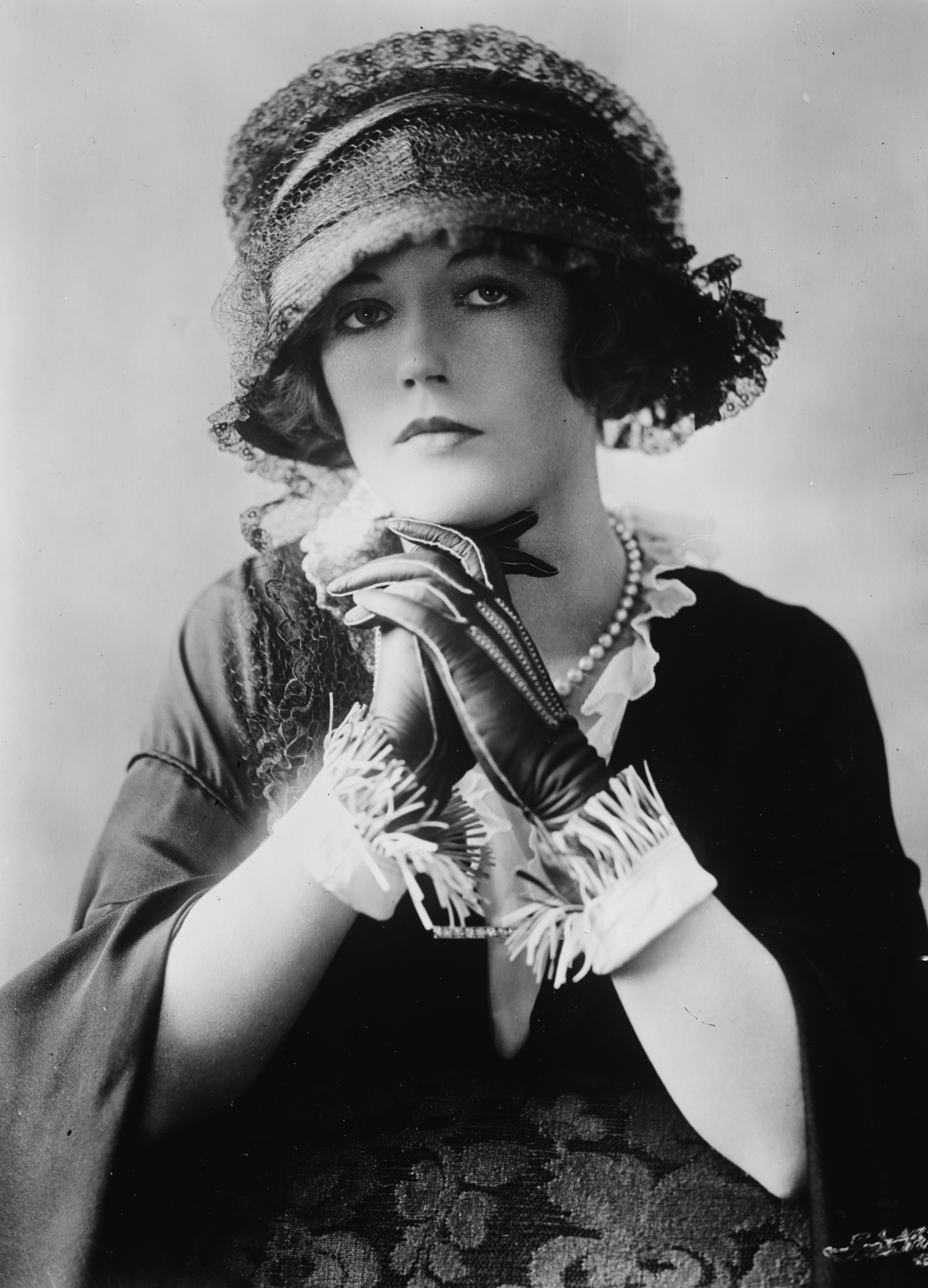
Marion Davies in a peach-basket style design, unknown date

The design had a brief revival in the 1930s, with a fashion commentator noting that "as fetching a line as ever it was in pre-war days, the peach-basket hat returned this week to offer lively competition to the flat-crowned hats as spring's favorite millinery". The article went on to describe a modified design of rough purple straw with a band of grosgrain ribbon and a bouquet of violets, as well as a classic peach basket with a navy straw brim and a tall tapering crown of leghorn straw dressed with flowers and a short veil. It was also a design that featured in the mid 1950s, usually in a simplified form but sometimes the straw frame was draped with soft fabric.

Although the term – and the classic peach-basket design – have not been widely seen since the 1950s, Princess Maria Laura of Belgium wore an organza hat described as a peach basket at the 2003 wedding of Prince Laurent of Belgium and Claire Coombs.

== See also ==
- List of hat styles
- Picture hat
