= Cartwheel hat =

Style of wide-brimmed hat

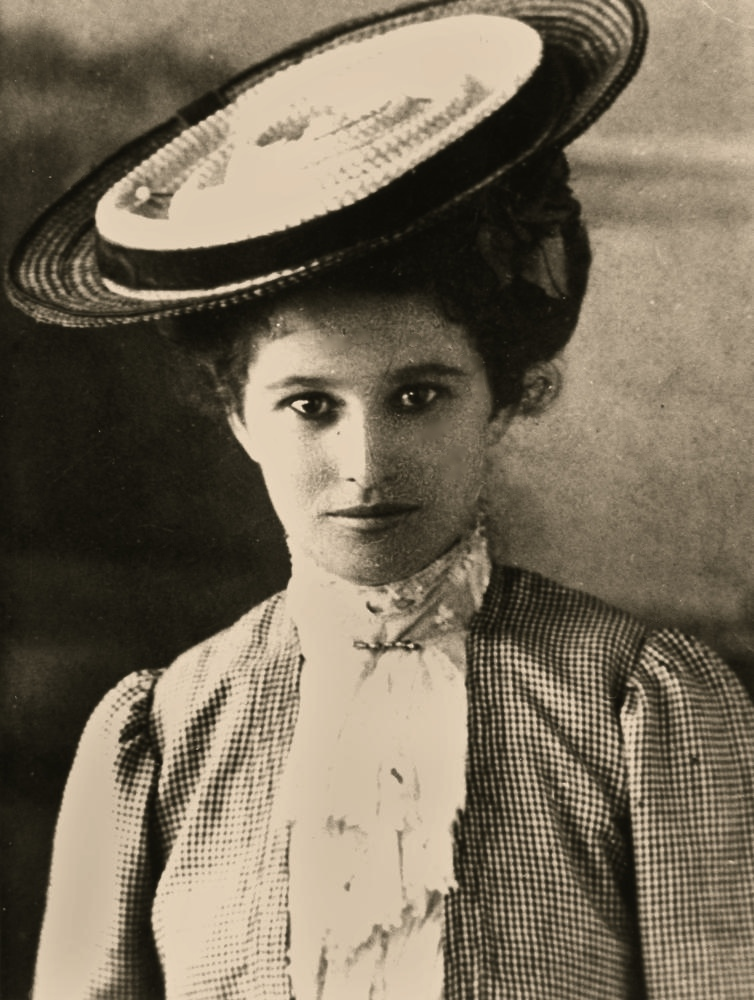
A cartwheel shape from the early 1900s, showing a wide brim and large pancake crown, with the hat secured by a hatpin.

A cartwheel hat (also cart wheel hat) is a hat with a wide-brimmed circular or saucer-shaped design. It may be made in a variety of materials, including straw or felt and usually has a low crown. It may be similar to the picture hat and halo-brimmed hat in shape. Typically, it is worn at an angle to show off the curve of the brim, rather than being worn at the back of the head in the manner of a halo hat.

== History ==
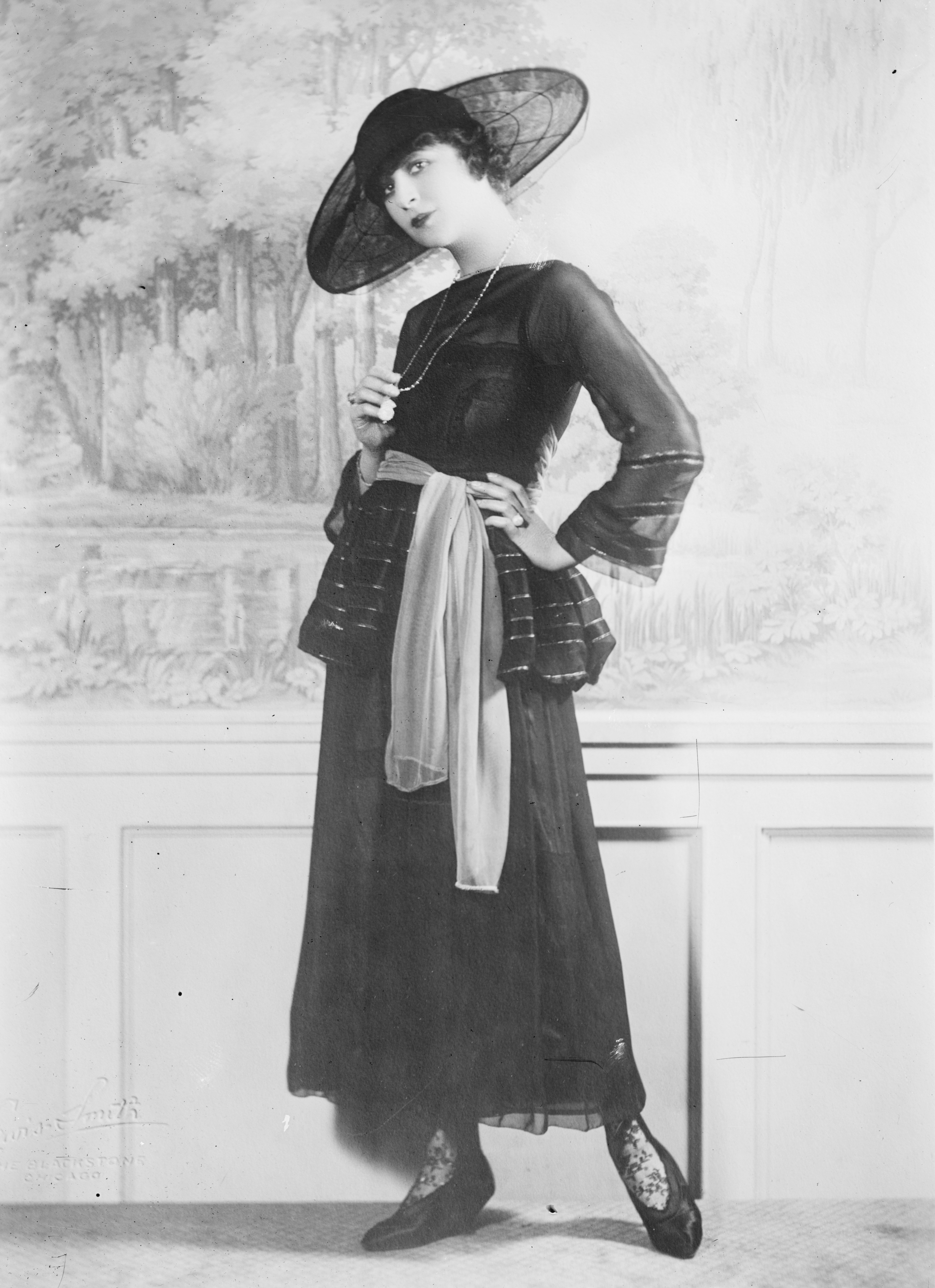
Fanny Brice wearing a cartwheel hat with transparent brim, c. 1910

The cartwheel hat became popular in the years leading up to World War I. The Milwaukee Sentinel described the new fashion in 1914: "Do not be astounded if you notice a smartly gowned woman with a hat of huge proportions...The new large hats are broad brimmed and have low crowns, which are not discernible when the hat is worn, hence they resemble cartwheels tilted at a becoming angle". These early versions might be covered in velvet, taffeta or silk; some included flower, fur or feather trims.

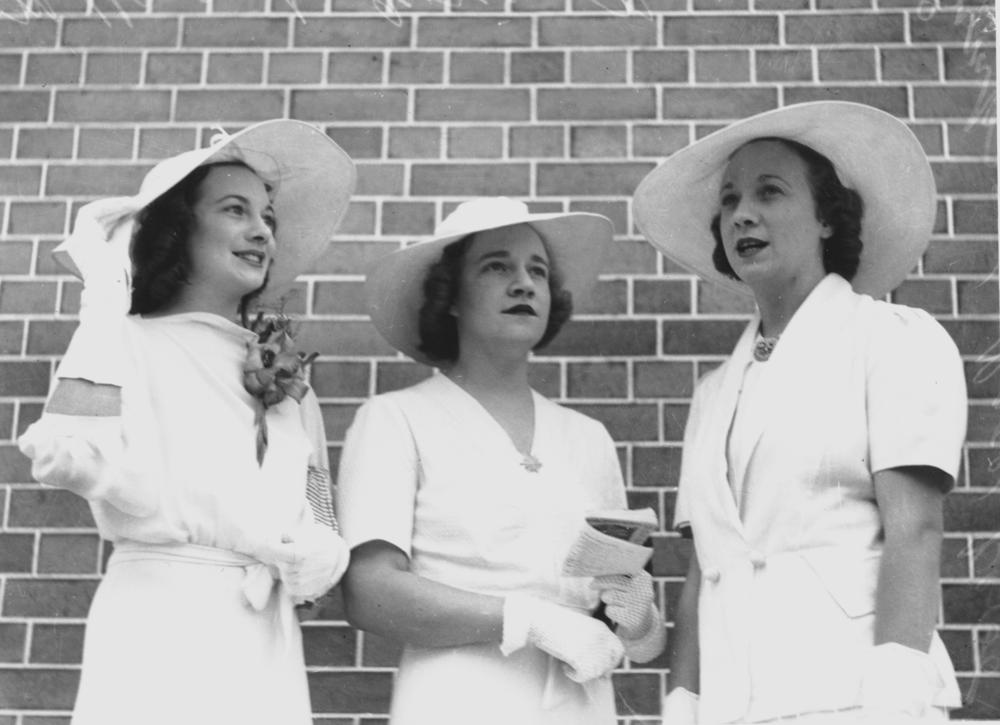
Queensland racegoers sporting cartwheel-shaped sunhats, 1939

=== 1930s styles ===
The cartwheel hat appeared in films and fashion during the 1930s – an American newspaper described the latest Paris fashion for straight and curled-brim cartwheel designs in 1934. The correspondent described crowns so shallow that hats had to be secured with a rubber band above or below the hair, which must be "perfectly coiffed" as it was revealed by the hat. In 1936, an Australian newspaper report about racegoers at Brisbane's Ascot racing meeting noted the abundance of: "wide-brimmed shady hats of the cartwheel type". The following year, The Observer described: "cartwheel hats with exceedingly low crowns and brims which slope very slightly downwards", also noting that London milliner Aage Thaarup was showing versions for Ascot in straw and lemon-yellow felt.

One of the most influential showcases of the potential of the style was the 1939 film Gone with the Wind, in which Vivien Leigh (Scarlett O'Hara) wore a huge cartwheel with green ribbons designed by celebrity milliner Mr. John.

== 'New Look' trends ==
While a Hattie Carnegie cartwheel design appeared on the cover of American Vogue in 1938, the style is most associated with the period after World War II austerity and make-do-and-mend was over. By 1945, new cartwheel styles were being offered with open crowns.

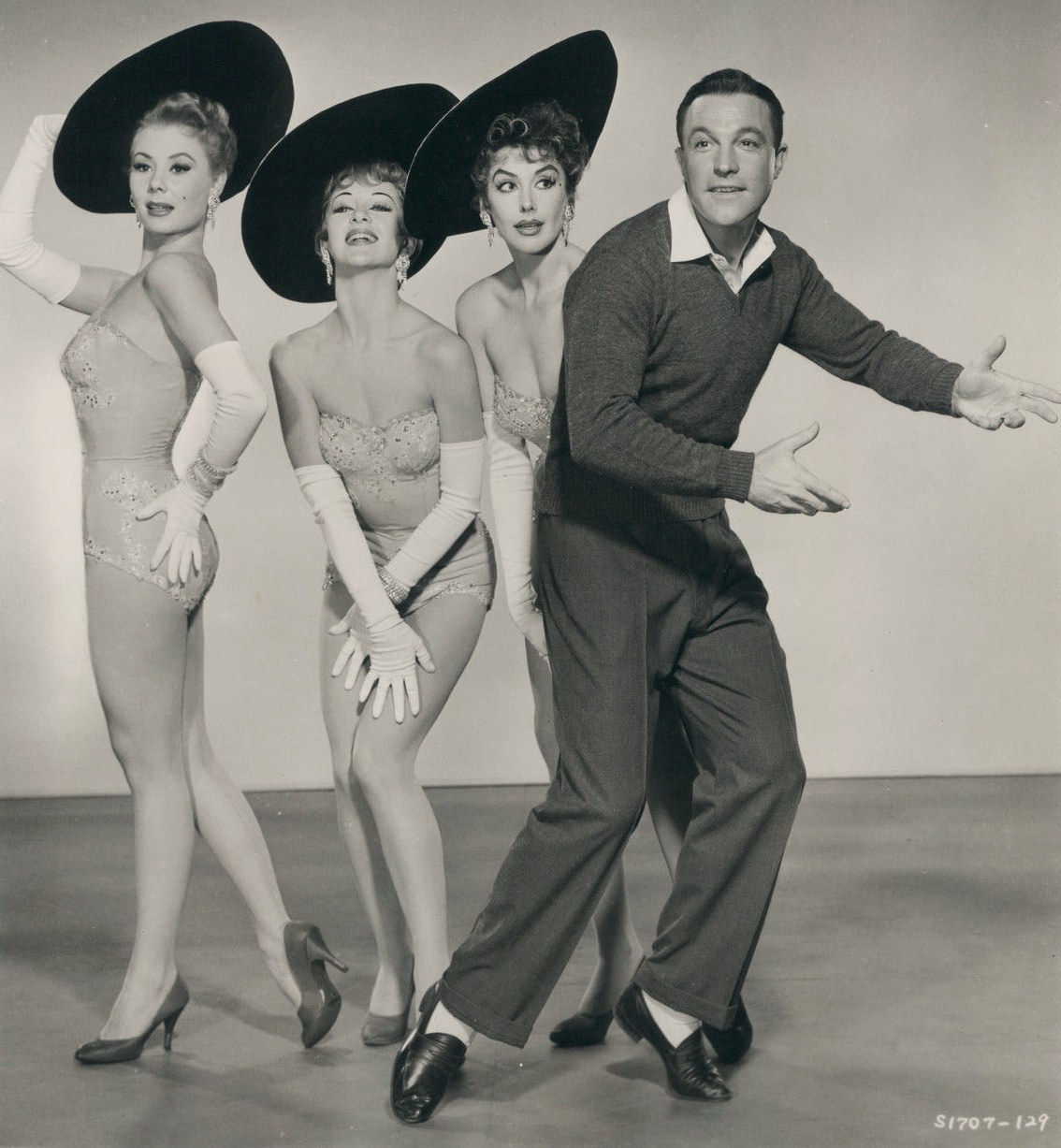
Publicity still from Les Girls, showing classic cartwheel hats worn at a jaunty angle, 1957

Four years later, Rita Hayworth wore a variation on the cartwheel made of sheer material to match the pleated Jacques Fath dress for her 'low key' wedding to Aly Khan – an event that generated huge interest and replica designs of her outfit. By spring 1950, the cartwheel hat was being tipped in Life alongside pleated dresses as the: "new silhouette". The hat designs featured were also by Mr. John. A month later, Life noted: "The recent tendency to go bareheaded has been reversed simply because the new season's narrow silhouette looks better when balanced with a hat." The article singled out the cartwheel in a new "unseasonal" coral velvet.

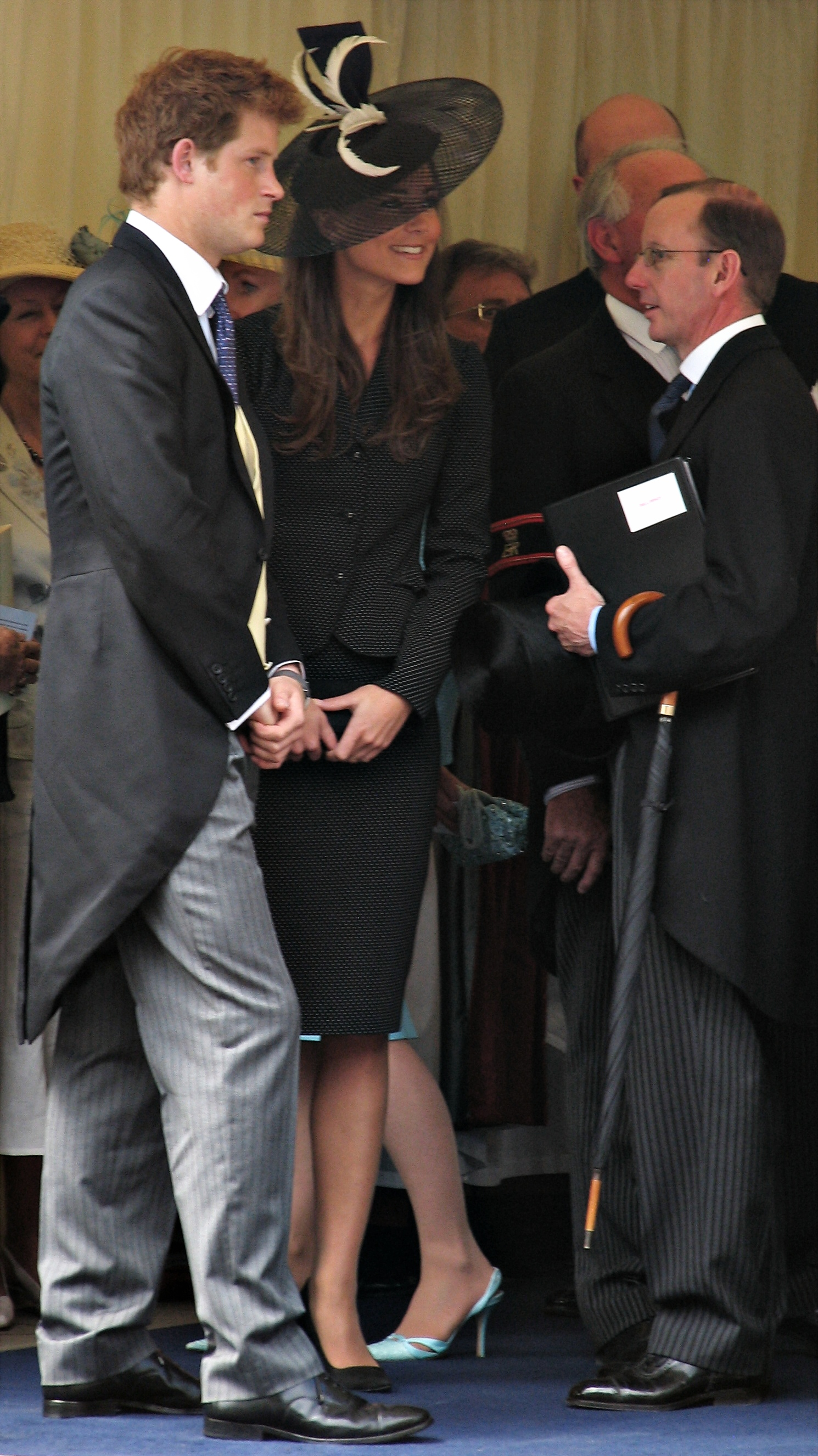
Kate Middleton, seen here with Prince Harry, wore a Philip Somerville cartwheel design in 2008

The cartwheel became particularly closely associated with New Look fashions. Dior's Y-line collection of autumn 1955 showcased cartwheel hats, paired with pearls, princess-line dresses and stoles. While the size and shape of hats could be extreme, such designs were made not just for day but evening wear; the Victoria and Albert Museum archive includes a Christian Dior cocktail frock designed to be worn with matching tulle cartwheel hat.

High-profile wearers of the style included Queen Elizabeth who wore a straw cartwheel shape on her tour of Australia the year after her coronation – although her hat was less extreme than some of the Dior models.

== Post 1950s revivals ==
The cartwheel hat has continued as a favourite showstopper for weddings and events – with designers such as Philip Somerville, Graham Smith and Frederick Fox including them in their millinery ranges. There have also been notable revivals in high fashion; Christian Lacroix featured dramatic forward-angled designs in his 1987 autumn collection. He also featured cartwheel shapes in neon orange and shocking pink in 2002.

== See also ==
- List of hat styles
- Halo hat
- Mushroom hat
