= Picture hat =

Women's hat

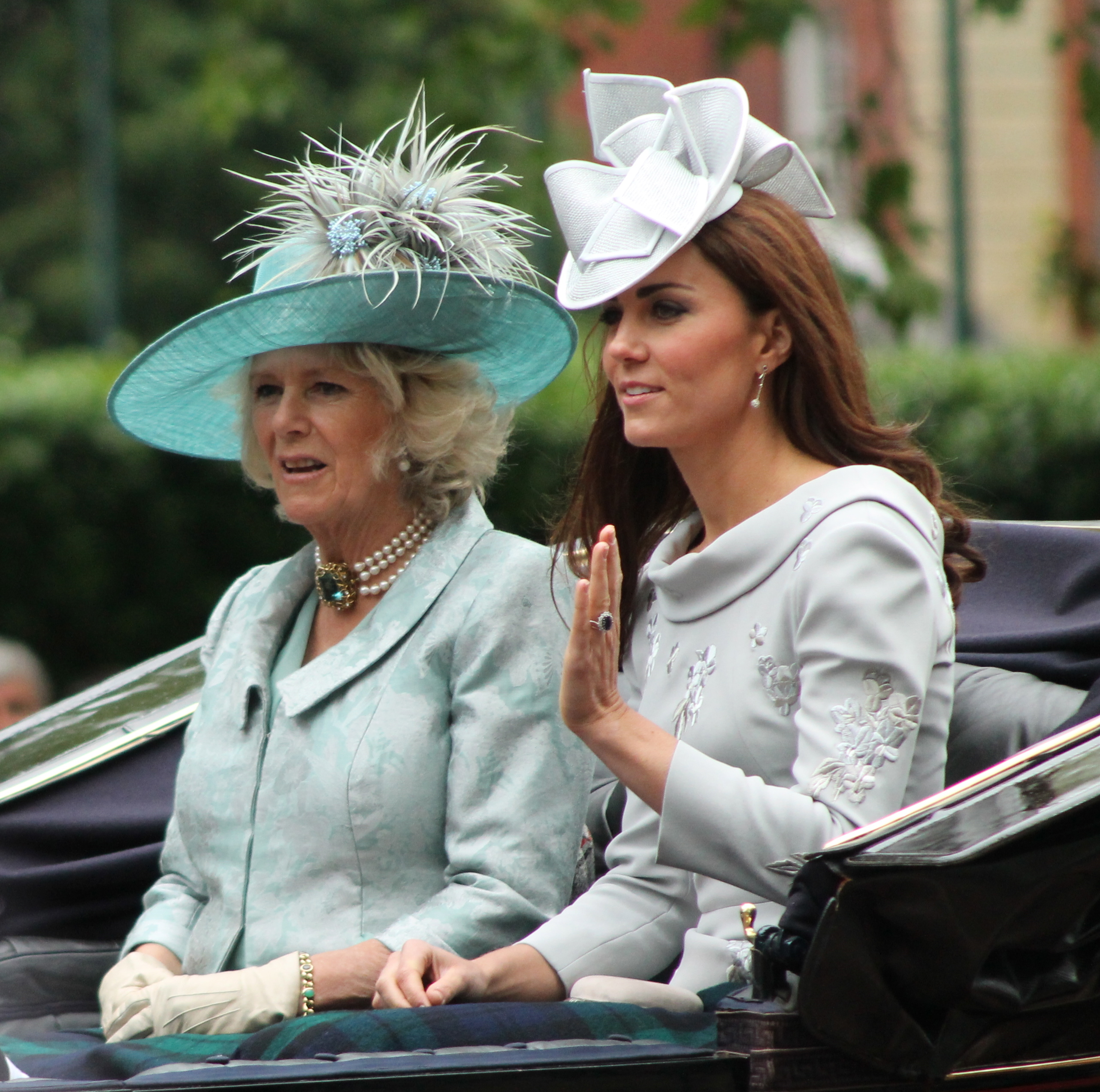
Camilla, Duchess of Cornwall (left) wearing a Philip Treacy picture hat, while Catherine, Duchess of Cambridge sports a hatinator in 2012

A picture hat or Gainsborough hat is an elaborate woman's hat with a wide brim. It has been suggested that the name may be derived from the way the broad brim frames the face to create a "picture".

This is a very broad category of hat; some versions may be similar to the halo or cartwheel hat. This style featured in virtually every decade of the 20th century, and has a history dating back to at least the 18th century.

== History of the hat ==
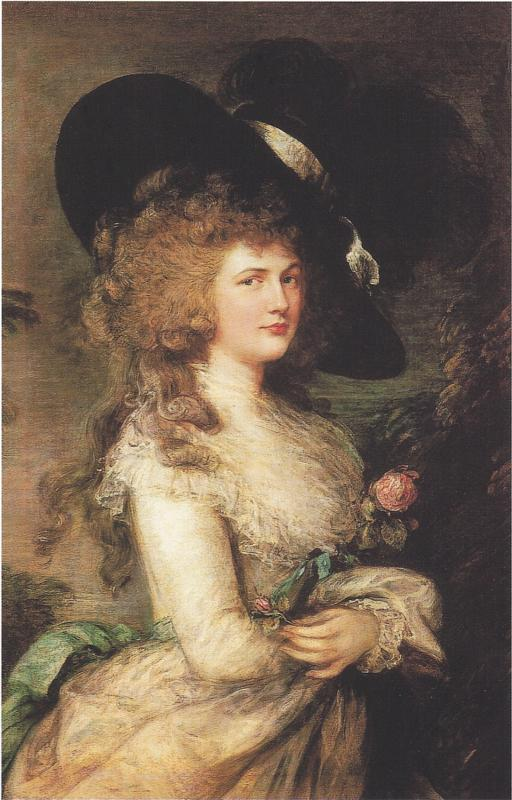
Thomas Gainsborough portrait of Georgiana, Duchess of Devonshire, said to be an inspiration for the picture or Gainsborough hat

The picture hat was first popularised as a style at the end of the 18th century and is said to have been inspired by the hats seen on portraits of society women painted by Thomas Gainsborough. It was then often known as the Gainsborough Chapeau. Other names included garden hat. These early hats were large, with a wide brim and were designed to perch on top of the lavish hairstyles popular during this era. Hats incorporated details such as feathers and trims – some are said to have even included whole stuffed birds.

The picture hat became fashionable again from the end of the 19th century – popularised in images of Gibson Girls in the United States and Canada and in the Gaiety Girls of the London theatre.

== 20th-century revival ==
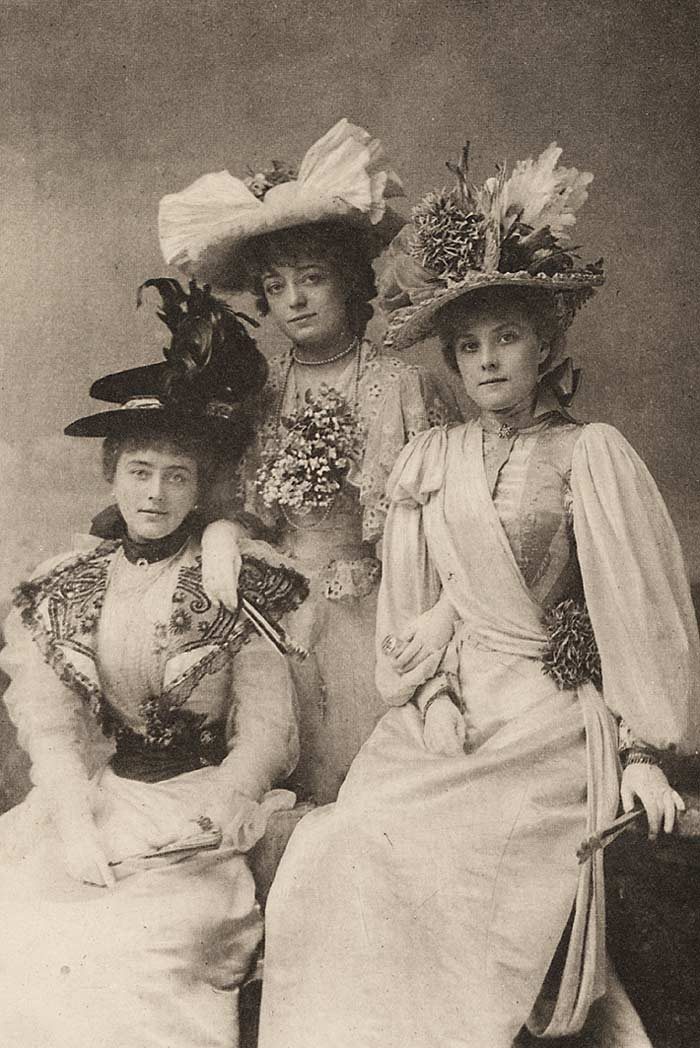
London's Gaiety Girls, here photographed in 1896, helped to popularise the fashion for picture hats

Woman posing in an elaborate picture hat in the early 20th century

In the early 1920s, The Times described Paris fashions of large picture hats in black velvet trimmed with traditional garden flowers. In the same year, the picture hat was described as: "greatly in favour", alongside the toque. As a fashion correspondent noted in 1922, its popularity may have been due to its adaptable nature: "They are wearable in every season, and vary more in the way they are put on than in shape". Styles were simpler than those worn in the Edwardian era – following the prevailing fashion of cloches by including a more close-fitting crown to flatter shorter hairstyles. A 1920s advert for Harrods' spring hats showcased a black straw picture hat with a wide brim embroidered with silk and chenille. By the end of the 1920s, picture-style hats were changing shape, as noted by a fashion correspondent: "Hats with higher fronts to the crown are being made, and one new shape has a turned-back brim at the side, in the style of the old-fashioned picture hat, but smaller".

=== 1930s designs ===
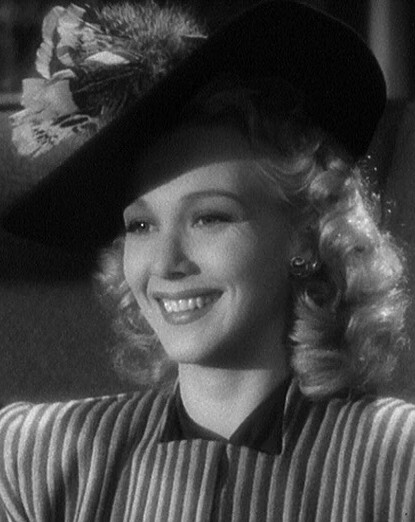
1941 picture hat worn by Carole Landis in Topper Returns

A 1930 review of millinery designs created by Madame Agnès – who was also a sculptor – noted a trend towards more unusual shapes for picture hats: "The brims of picture hats are irregular and are attached to the crown in such a way as to lift the front away from the forehead or to form a little point". Picture hats remained popular for sporting events and marriages, although by the middle of the decade some designs were becoming smaller. In 1935, The Times described summer designs worn forward on the head, with low crowns and trimmings of flowers, fruit or draped fabric. Picture hats continued to be worn for both day and evening events – a Paquin evening gown of 1938 included a black velvet model with veil, worn with matching elbow-length gloves.

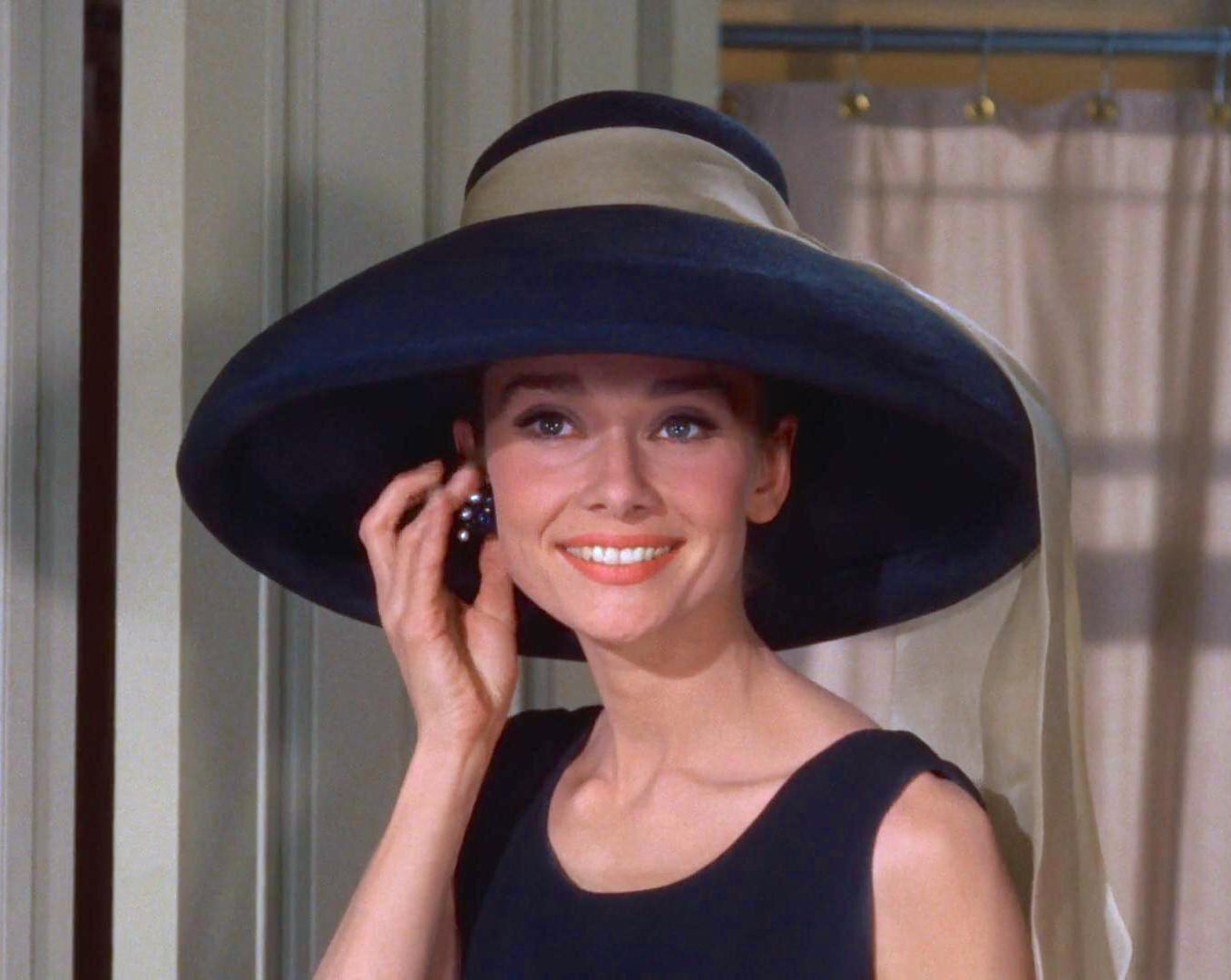
The dramatic picture hat, as worn by Audrey Hepburn in the 1961 film Breakfast at Tiffany's, became fashionable from the late 1950s

== Post-war picture hats ==
Queen Elizabeth II and other members of the British royal family continued to favour picture hats in the immediate post-war years, and they remained a fixture at weddings and sporting occasions. By 1955, however, The Times had announced the disappearance of the picture hat in fashion, as streamlined cloche, cocktail and new conical-shaped hats came into vogue. The article noted: "A solitary wide-brimmed classic among some 60 models selected from those now going into the shops...but such a shape has for long been beloved of many Englishwomen, and by comparison the rest of the hats were a chic and challenging assortment". The death knell was perhaps sounded too soon, as by 1958 hats were either very large or very small. Parisian milliner Claude Saint-Cyr was designing dramatic picture hats – relying more on shape than on trimmings for effect – very much in the style that would be worn three years later by Audrey Hepburn in Breakfast at Tiffany's.

During the 1960s and 1970s, the picture hat persisted – although designs such as the pillbox and bucket hat were more popular – but tended to have a higher crown. The Victoria and Albert Museum archive has a photograph of a Madame Paulette model from 1963 that illustrates the fashion for height as well as width. By the early 1970s, there was a revival – with memorable examples including the design worn at the Saint Tropez wedding of Bianca Jagger in 1971, and the outsize model worn by Farrah Fawcett at her wedding to Lee Majors in 1973.

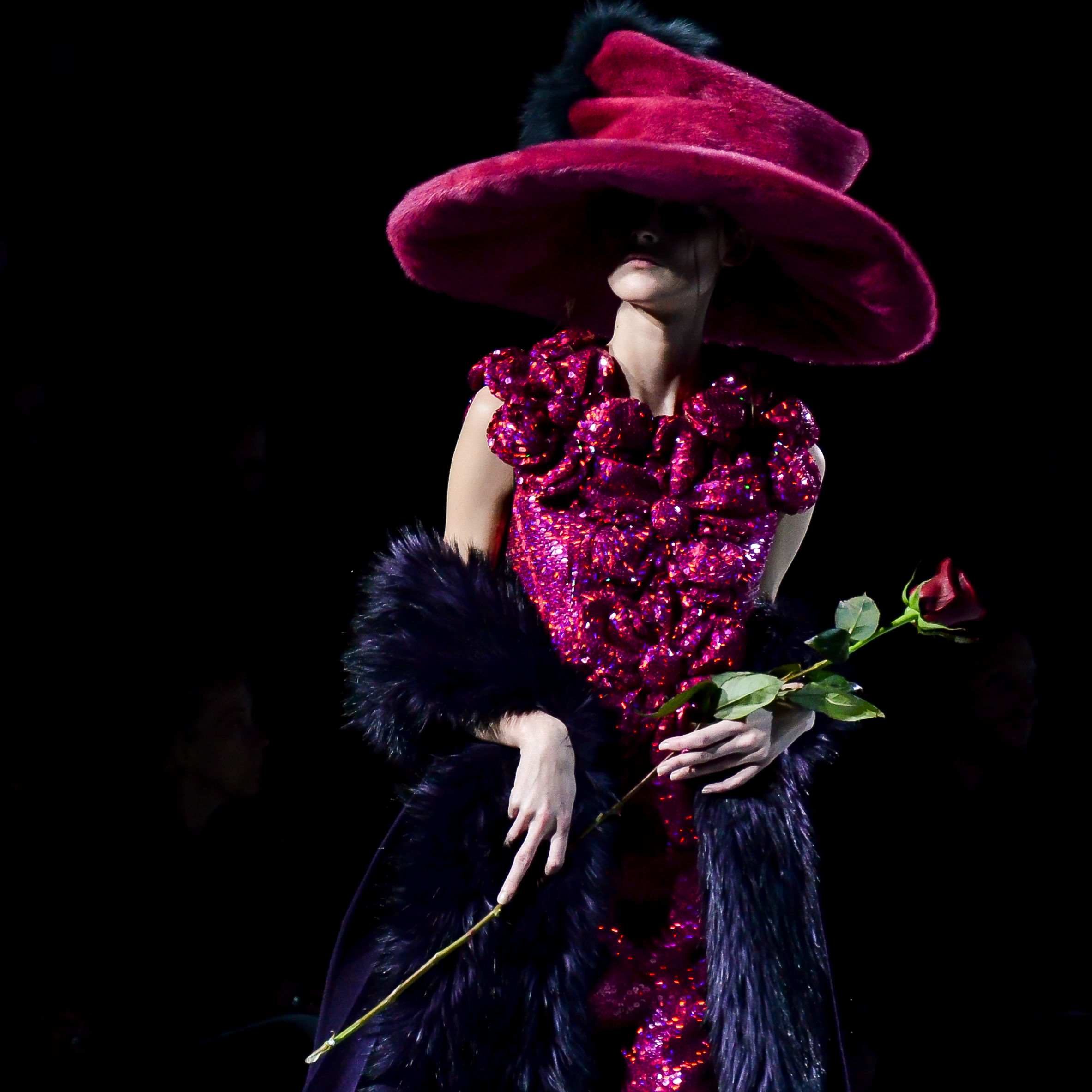
Marc Jacobs showcased enormous Victorian-style picture hats at New York Fashion Week A/W 2012

The picture hat remains a popular style for events such as Ladies' Day at Ascot and its high-profile fans include Queen Camilla, who is known for her wide-brimmed designs.

The Dynasty character Alexis Colby (played by Joan Collins) was famous for wearing her signature picture hats throughout the 1980s soap opera on the ABC.

Picture hats still appear on the fashion catwalk; notably Marc Jacobs included oversized fur designs harking back to the late Victorian age in his 2012 autumn-winter show at New York Fashion Week.

== See also ==
- List of hat styles
- Cartwheel hat
- Halo hat
- Peach basket hat
