= Breton (hat) =

Woman's hat with a round crown and a deep brim

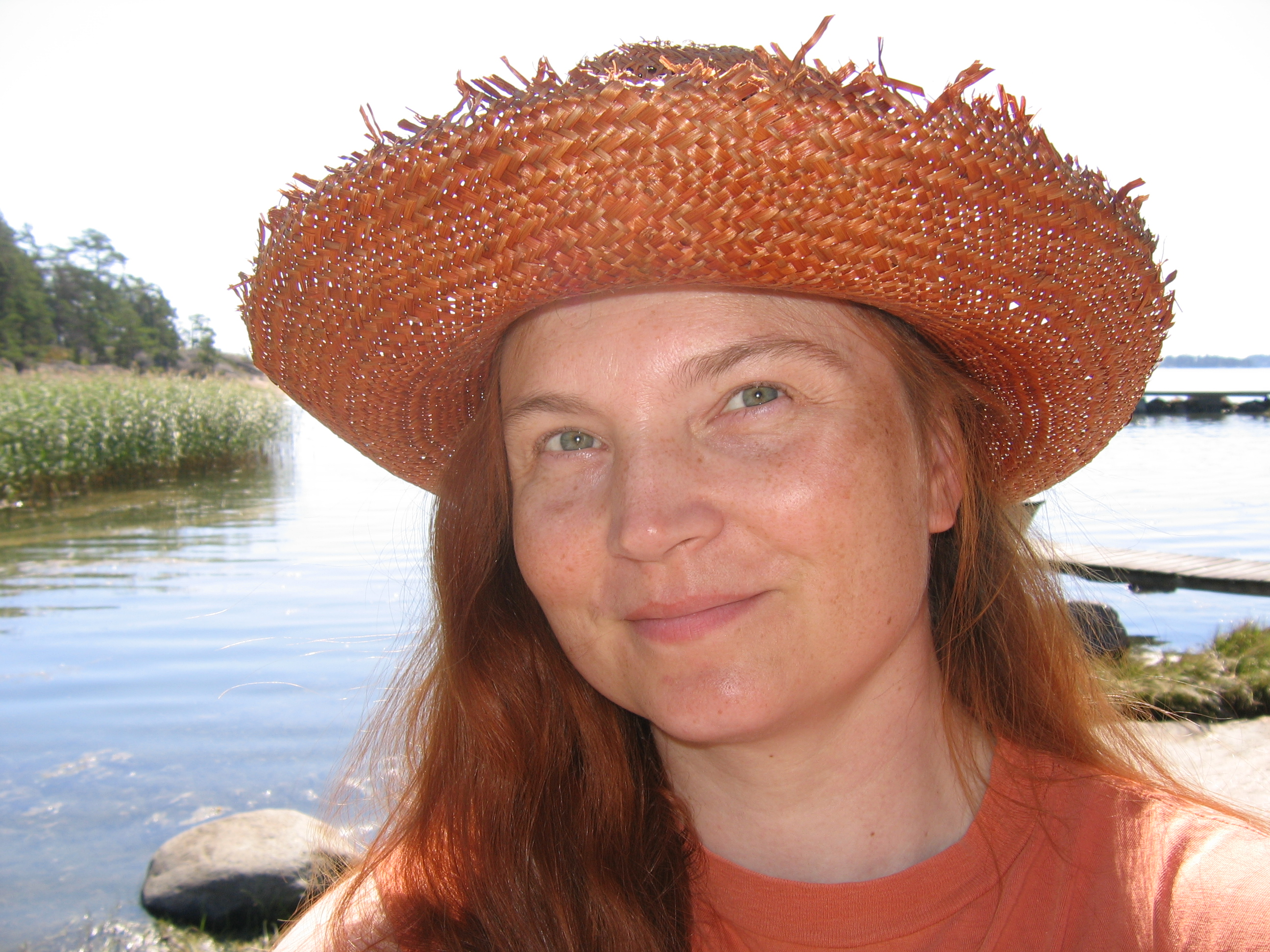
Breton hat in straw

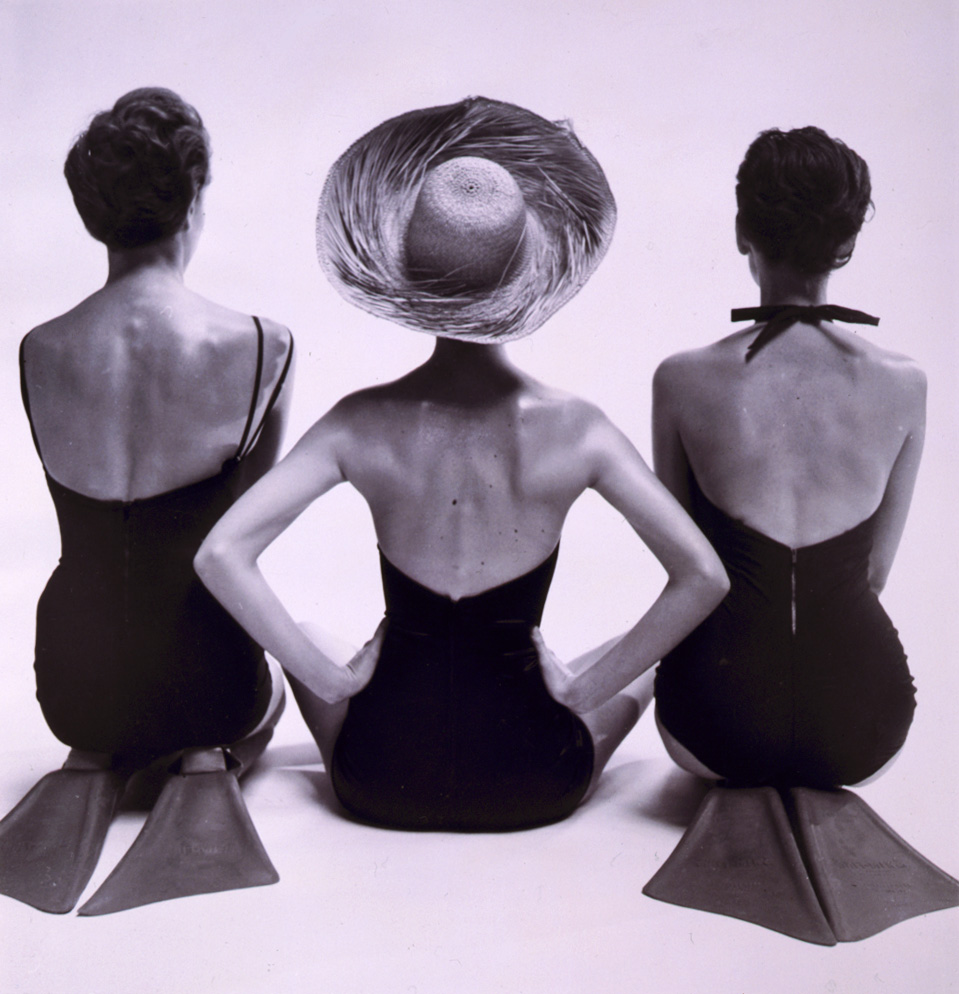
1950 swim fashion by photographer Toni Frissell, showing a Breton-style sunhat with upturned brim

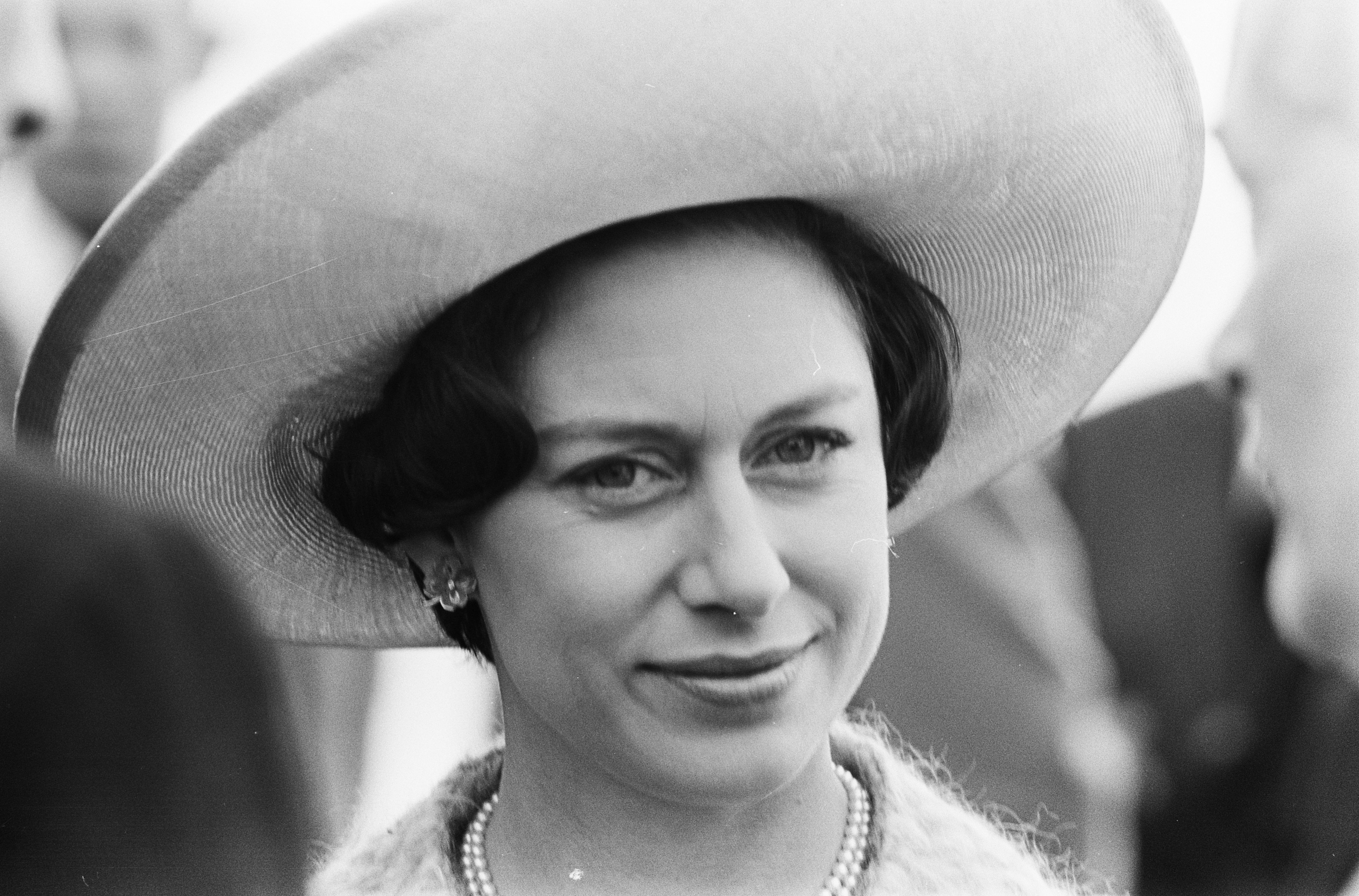
Princess Margaret wearing a large-brimmed variation of the classic Breton in 1965

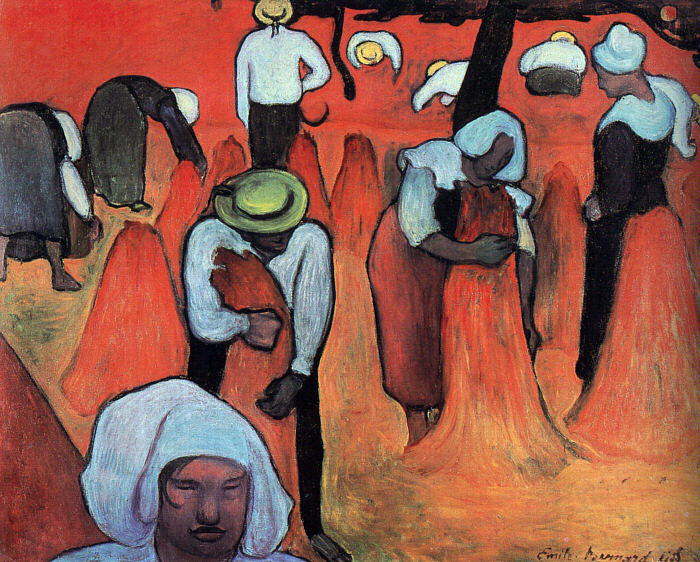
Émile Bernard's Buckwheat Harvesters at Pont-Aven, 1888 – the Breton is said to be based on the straw hats worn by Brittany labourers.

A Breton (or Bretonne) is a woman's hat with a round crown and a deep brim that is turned upwards all the way round, exposing the face. Sometimes the hat has a domed crown. Typically it is worn tilted to the back of the head.

The style first appeared under this name in the 19th century and was generally made of lightweight and malleable material such as straw or felt. It is said to derive from the straw hats traditionally worn by Breton agricultural workers. It is not to be confused with the Breton cap, a fabric cap with a peak at the front associated with fishermen.

== 1960s popularity ==
The Breton had a revival of popularity in the 1960s, with high-profile wearers helping to make it fashionable. During this era it also appeared in more extreme styles, with oversized turned-back brims. After British model Jean Shrimpton caused a scandal at the Melbourne Cup Carnival in Australia in 1965 by attending Derby Day hatless, bare legged and in a short summer frock, she returned three days later to the Melbourne Cup in a sober tailored suit with a large ice-blue straw Breton hastily created by local milliner Adele Chapeaux of South Yarra. In 1968, a neat straw version was worn right on the back of the head by Mia Farrow in the horror film Rosemary's Baby.

Such was the hat's popularity that The Times fashion editor Prudence Glynn singled it out in 1966 as part of the British 'uniform' at official summer events. In a feature warning of the perils of choosing an expensive occasion outfit in a country where the weather could not be relied upon, she said: "Look at the photographs taken at the Derby. The weather couldn't have been more unpromising, yet there were the British ladies staunchly parading the British Special Occasion Outfit (Subsection: Race Meetings) – Sling back shoes, wind-torn Bretons clapped onto untidy damp hair, nodding and smiling away under tons of artificial pansies and draped tulle."

As well as coming in a variety of sizes, Bretons may feature additional details such as feathers, flowers and ribbon trims.

=== Variations ===
In 1955, Christian Dior introduced the wide-brimmed Breton – also known as the padre hat – for its resemblance to ecclesiastical headgear. Unlike the more traditional tipped back Breton, this model was worn flat on the head.

== See also ==
- Bumper brim
- List of hat styles
