= Halo hat =

Style of hat

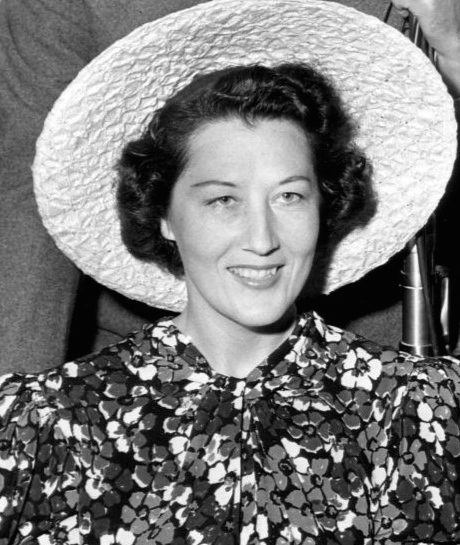
Full-circle halo-shaped hat from 1941, showing off the fashion for curls and more bouffant hair

A halo hat (sometimes halo brim hat) is a millinery design in which the headgear acts as a circular frame for the face, creating a halo effect. The design is said to date back to the late 19th century, when it was known as the aureole hat; this name is sometimes still used. It may also be known as the angel hat or bambini – the latter said to derive from Italian for terracotta plaques depicting the infant Christ.

A halo hat may be a wide range of sizes – some lying close to the head in the style of a bonnet or cloche and others that are similar in dimensions to a picture or cartwheel hat. Typically, designs are worn towards the back of the head to create the 'halo' effect. Some designs with open crowns may also be referred to as halo hats or as diadems. Popular from the 1930s on, the halo hat was created in a variety of fabrics – knitted or crocheted versions could be made at home – and could be a circle or semi-circle in shape. The halo became popular with brides; one of the most famous examples is the blue straw half-circle halo created for the wedding of Wallis Simpson by the Parisian millinery house of Caroline Reboux.

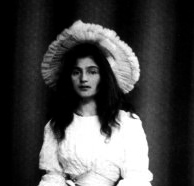
1894 portrait of Julie Manet showing an aureole-effect hat framing her face

== History ==
The halo hat is said to have first come into fashion the late 1880s, when it was usually known as an aureole hat (a synonym for halo), and this was a name that continued to be used to describe the circular or semi-circular shape into the 1930s. The Milwaukee Sentinel used the term to describe a new hat style in 1937. Similarly, describing the outfits worn by racegoers at a Sandown Park meet in 1937, The Times referred to an: "aureole-brimmed" hat design.

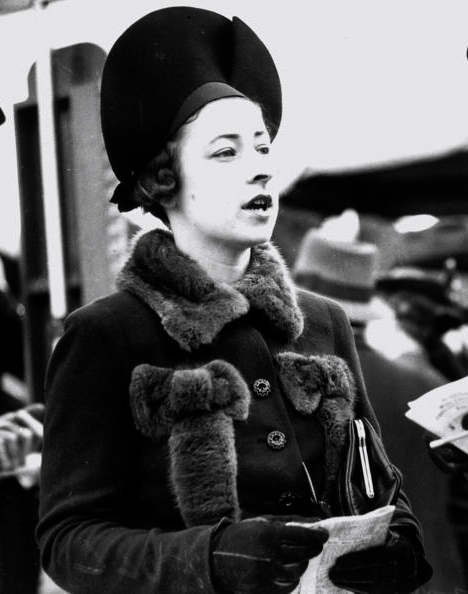
Semicircular halo hat worn in 1940 at an Australian race meeting; this design includes a band to hold the hair in place

=== 1930s popularity ===
The halo shape became popular again from the start of the 1930s in both the United States and Europe. It was a distinct move away from the cloche style that was worn low over the brow, as the halo exposed the face and brow, also showing off more elaborate curled hairstyles becoming popular during this era.

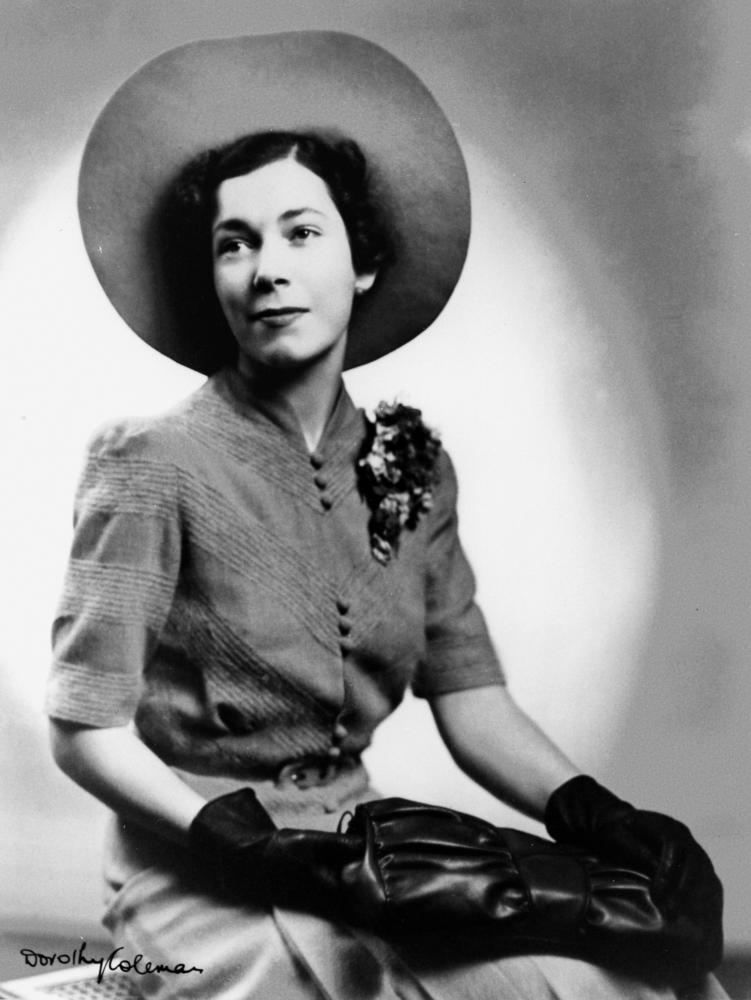
Australian bride wearing a large halo-effect hat, 1941

"Halo hats are so new" declared an advert in a US newspaper in 1931. A 1934 Sears catalogue featured a halo hat design as part of its Loretta Young collection, adding: "Take advantage of Loretta Young's fashion judgement and wear this new off-the-face hat! It's different ... There's something of the angel's halo and something of the bucaneer's bravado in its dramatic, folded-back brim".

In 1933 The Times reviewed the Christmas catalogues, saying: "the new season millinery, with its leading novelty, the 'halo' hat, is specially interesting". The following year, the Duchess of York was described as wearing a velvet halo hat to attend a charity matinee with Princess Elizabeth. Three years later, Wallis Simpson would wear an iconic gown and halo bridal headpiece, made by Caroline Reboux's studio in Paris and trimmed with pink and blue feathers.

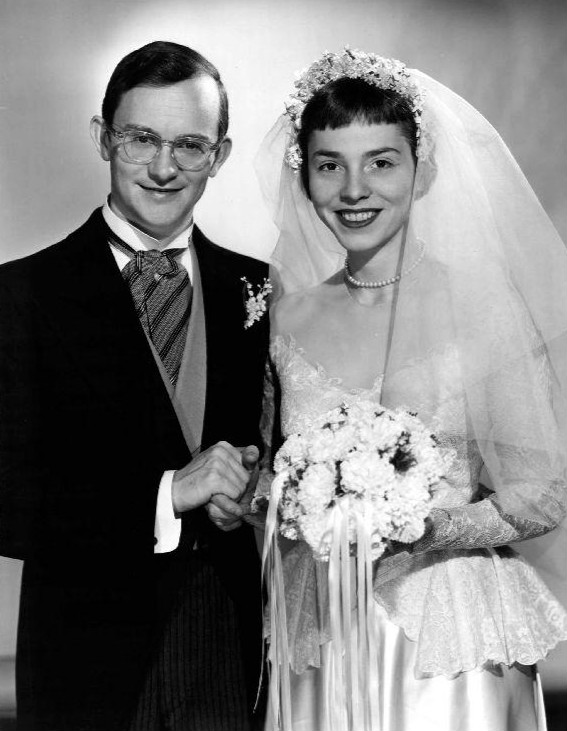
Wedding half-circle halo in 1954

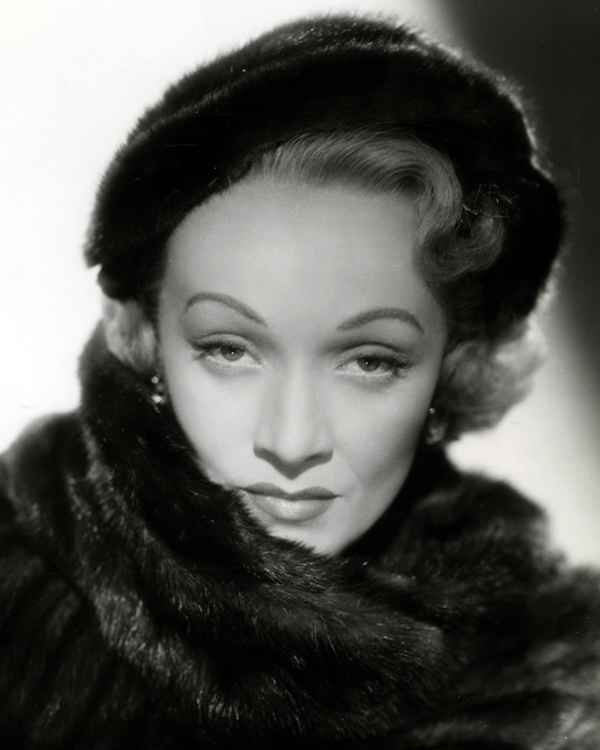
Marlene Dietrich wore a discreet halo-brimmed fur hat in No Highway, 1951

== Design variations ==
The halo was a flexible design. While it could create a large frame around the face – as with the circular straw design that featured on the Picture Post in 1940 – it could also have more modest proportions. Like the draped turban, the halo style lent itself to adaptations – feathers, bows, trims or flowers could be added – making it a versatile hat style. It could also be made at home; a variety of patterns were created during the 1940s to inspire knitters and sewers. Larger versions suited the post-war New Look designs, balancing the proportions of the full skirts that were fashionable after wartime austerity.

The halo-style hat became popular for wedding outfits – future First Lady of the United States Betty Ford wore a large-brimmed halo wedding hat in 1938 – and half halos would become a staple design for more traditional wedding headpieces, remaining popular in bridal designs.

=== Revivals ===
In the mid 1960s, British Pathé's 1964 film Hats on for Winter featured a large-scale halo design with sunburst pattern, alongside visors and caps. Designers such as Graham Smith created oversized examples during the late 1980s.

Among the most memorable modern halo-shaped hats are the design created by Philip Treacy for influential fashion editor Isabella Blow, and the wheatsheaf halo-effect headpiece he designed for the wedding of Camilla Parker Bowles to Prince Charles.

== See also ==
- List of hat styles
- Bumper brim
- Cartwheel hat
- Half hat
