= Dutch cap =

Hat associated with traditional Dutch woman's costumes

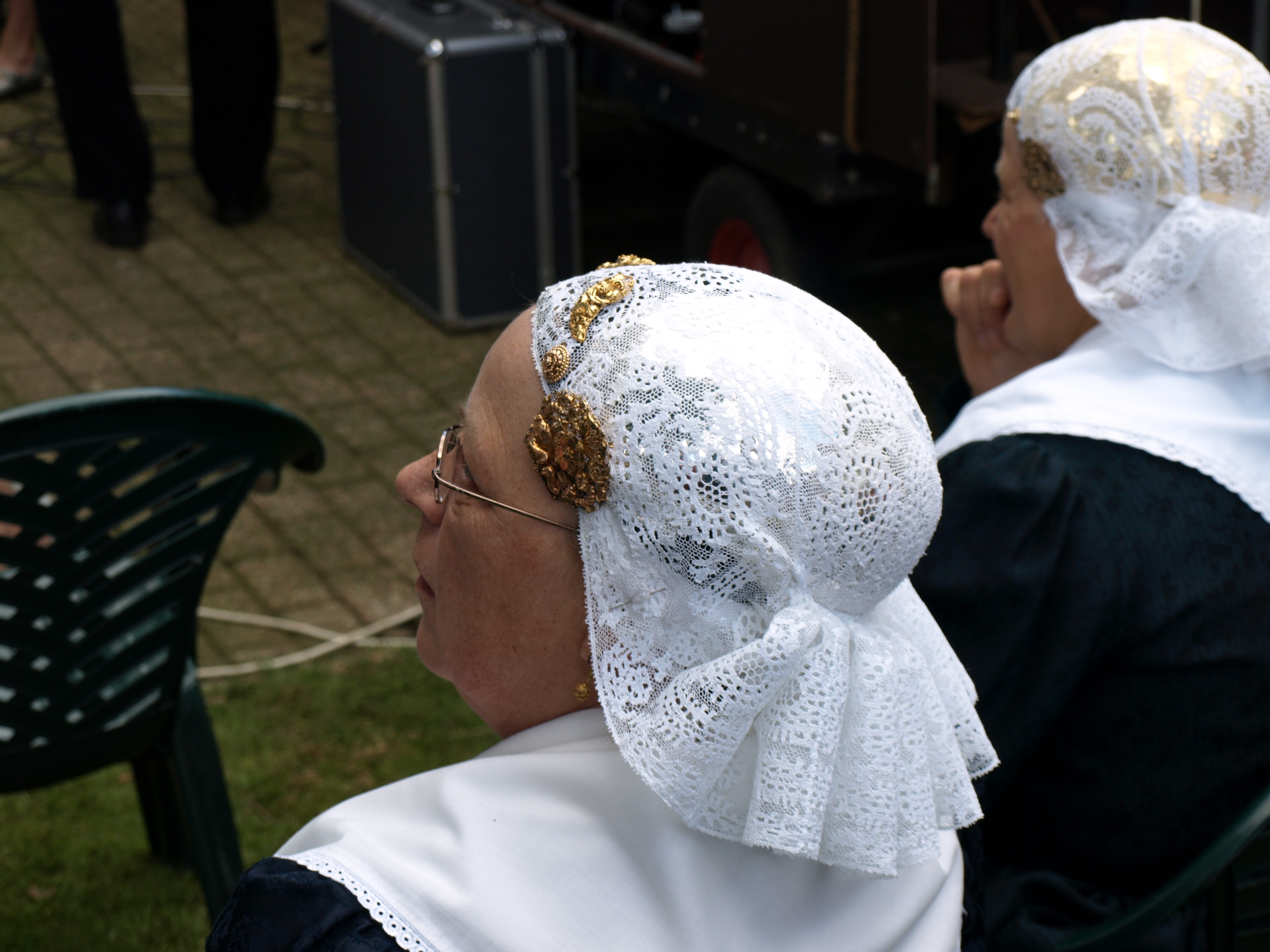
Woman's cap of Drenthe, with lace, gold and silver ornaments

A Dutch cap or Dutch bonnet is a style of woman's hat associated with the various traditional Dutch woman's costumes. Usually made of white cotton or lace, it is sometimes characterized by triangular flaps or wings that turn up on either side. It can resemble some styles of nurse's hat.

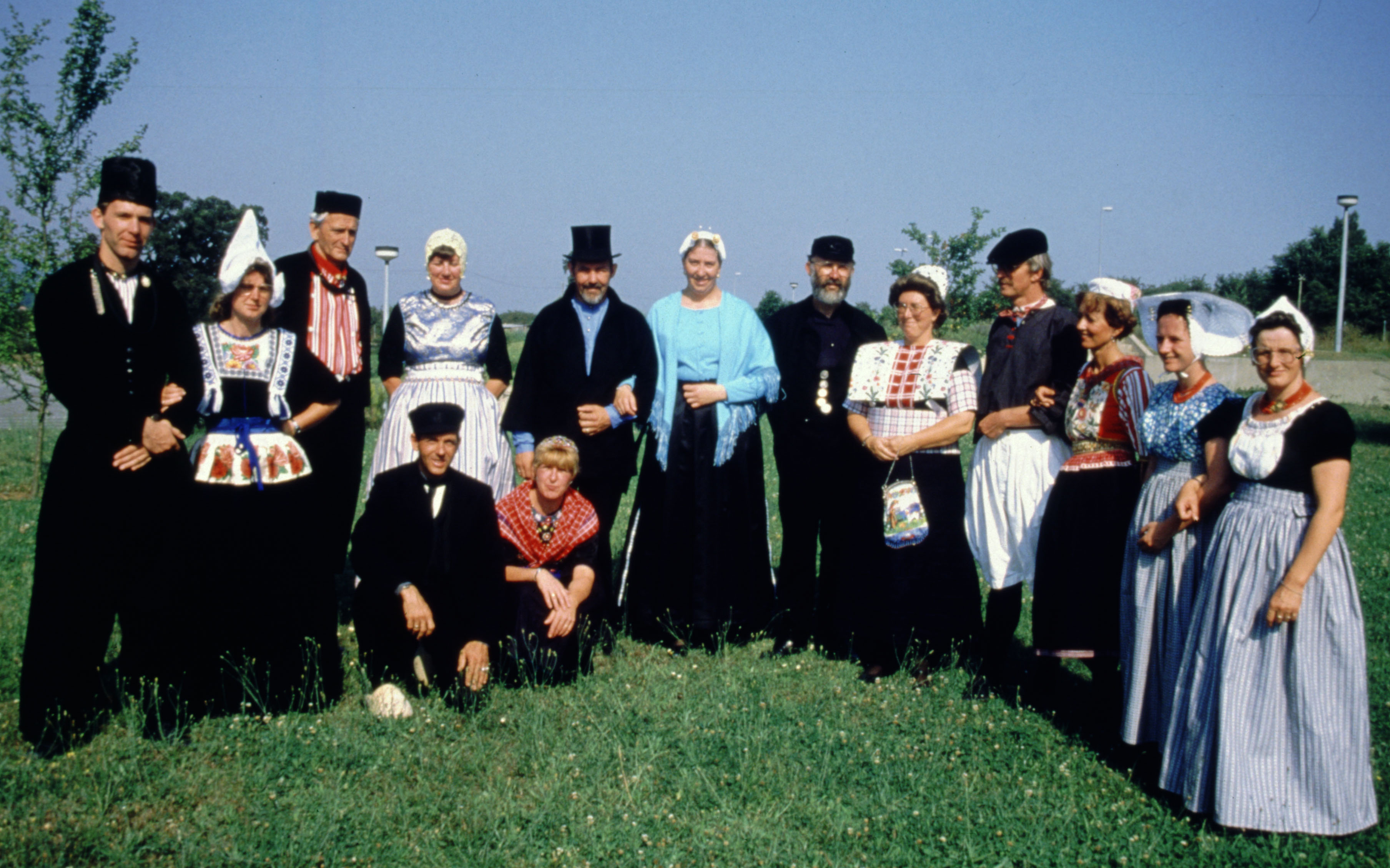
Traditional costumes of the Netherlands

Many parts of the Netherlands have their own traditional costumes.

== Images ==
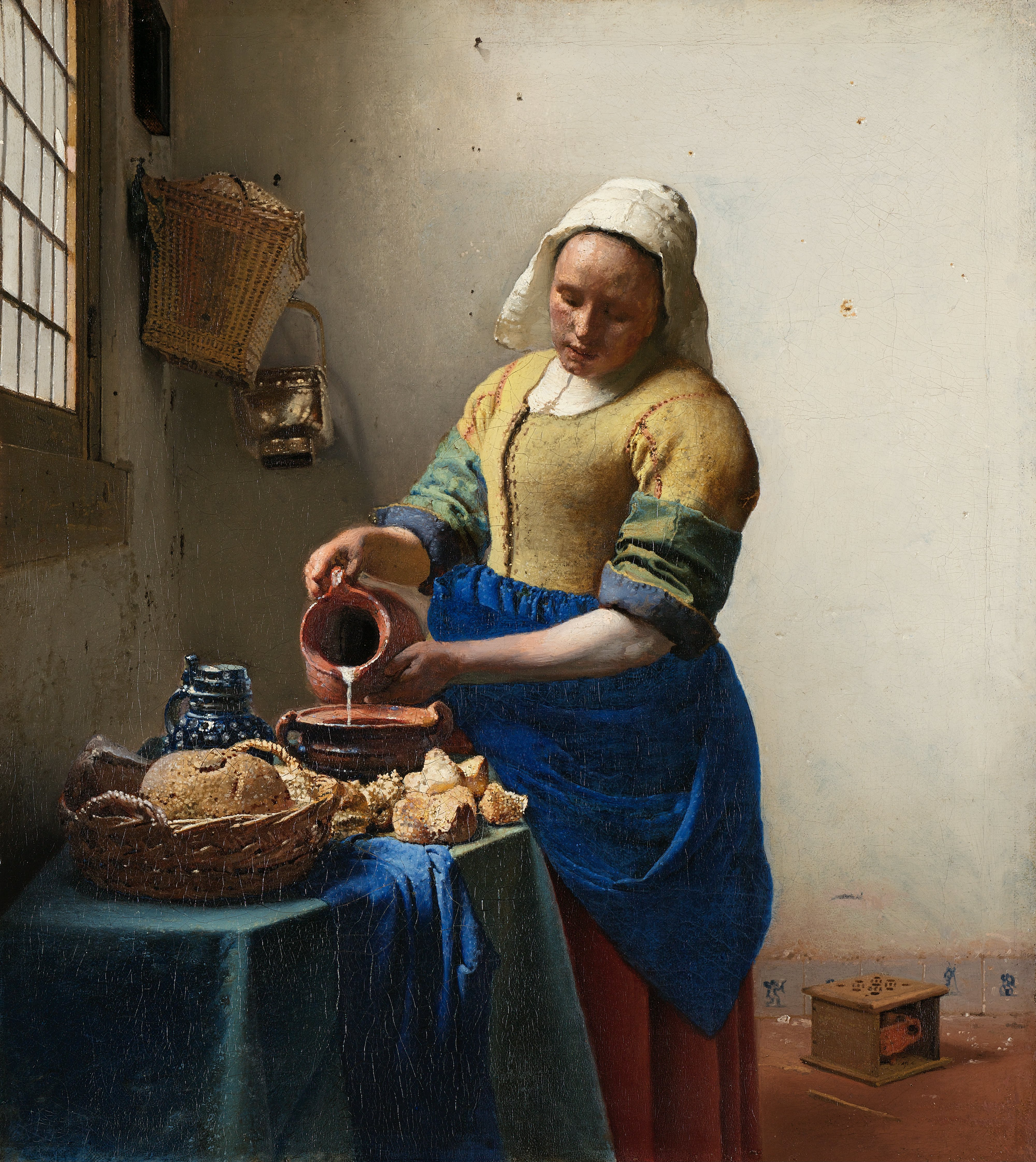
Dutch working girl (17th century) as portrayed by Johannes Vermeer

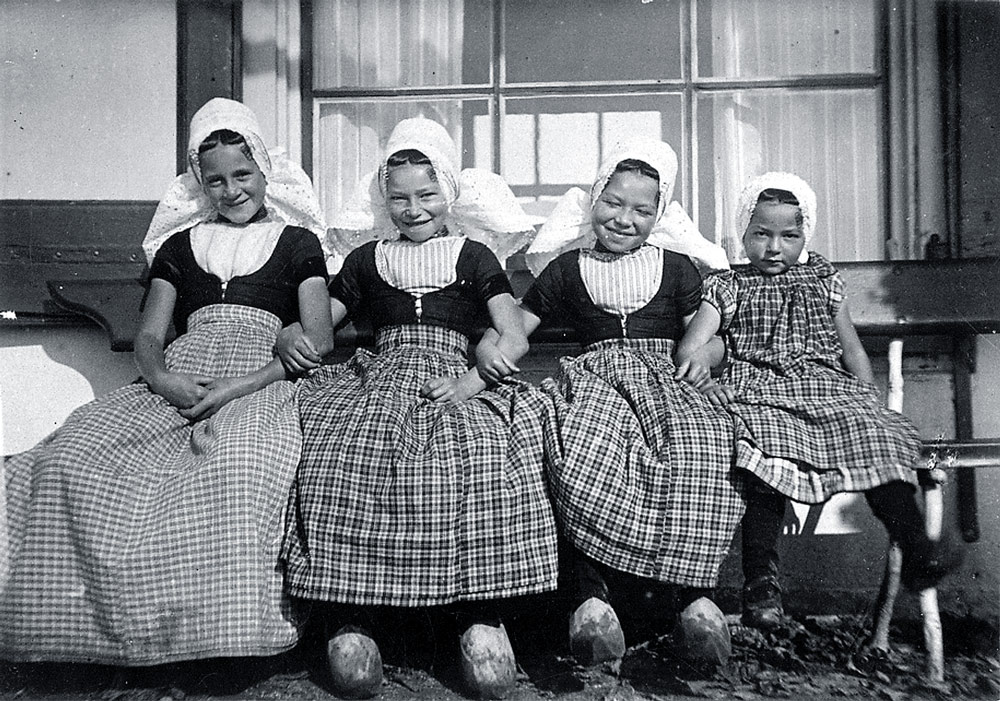
Girls in the traditional costume of Arnemuiden, featuring caps with large "wings"

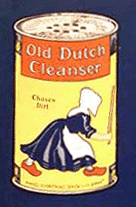
Old Dutch Cleanser label. The girl's Dutch nationality is suggested by her red clogs and white cap.

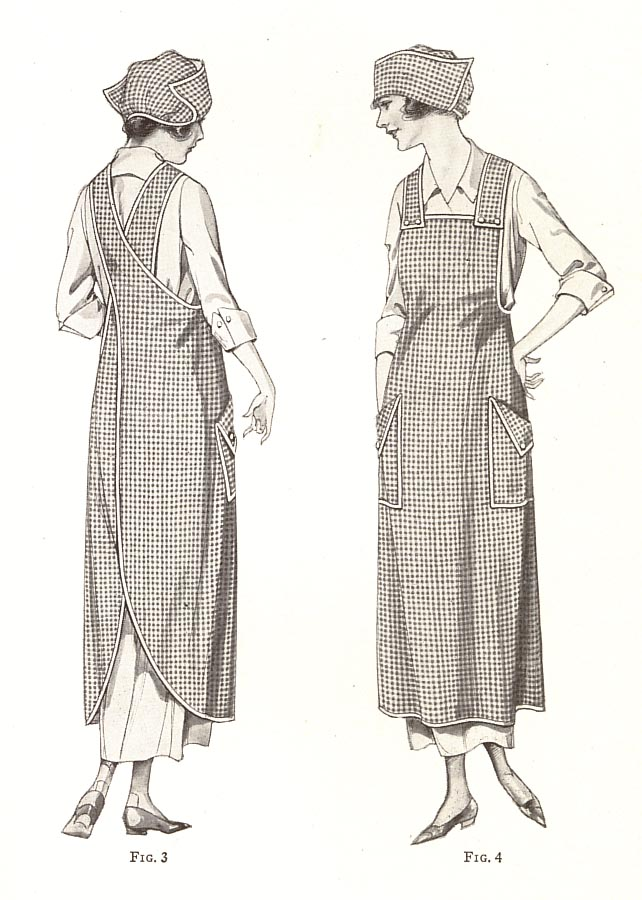
An American woman of circa 1920 dressed to do housework, wearing a "Dutch cap"

== See also ==
- List of hat styles
