= Trouser clips =

Cycling accessory worn around the ankle

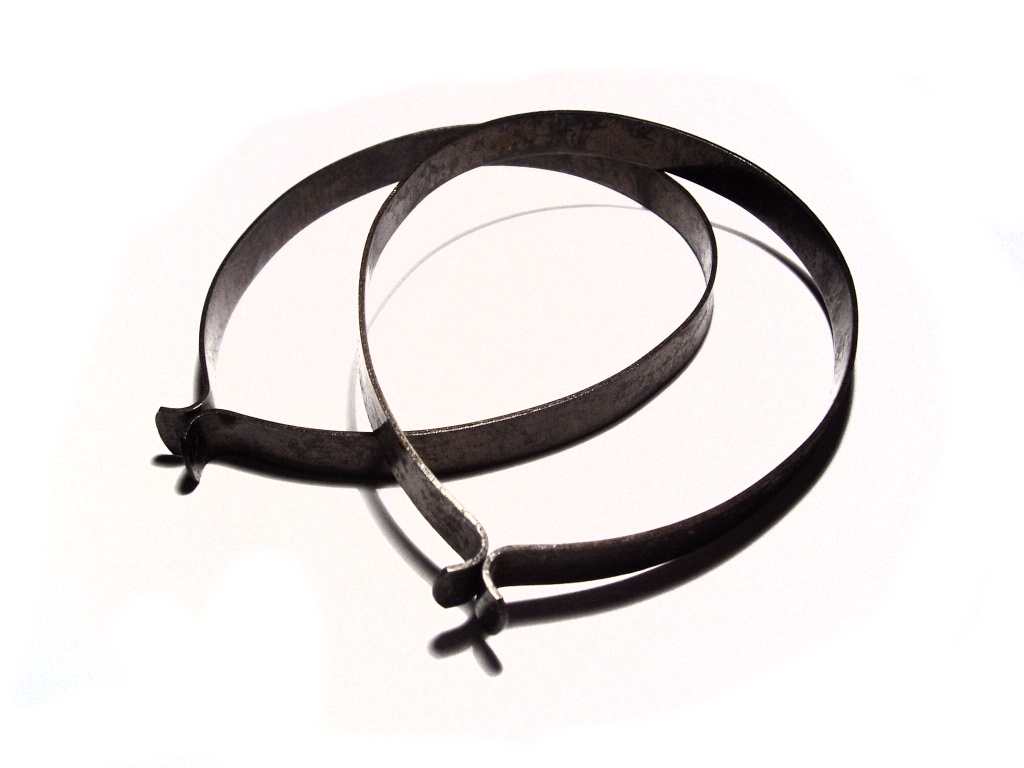
A pair of metal bicycle clips.

Bicycle clips, also called trouser clips, are small C-shaped pieces of thin metal worn around the ankle when cycling in trousers. They are designed to prevent the bottom of the trousers from becoming caught in the chain or crank mechanism, and from being covered in oil and dirt. Additionally, they may have fluorescent (usually yellow) and reflective materials attached which make the cyclist more visible.

== See also ==
- Terry clip
