= List of hat styles =

Hats have been common throughout the history of humanity, present on some of the very earliest preserved human bodies and art. Below is a list of various kinds of contemporary or traditional hat.

== List ==
=== Brimmed ===
Includes brimmed styles.

Image	Name	Description	Refs.
Akubra	Akubra	An Australian brand of bush hat, whose wide-brimmed styles are a distinctive part of Australian culture, especially in rural areas.	
Boater	Boater	A flat-brimmed and flat-topped straw hat formerly worn by seamen. Schools, especially public schools in the UK, might include a boater as part of their (summer) uniform. Now mostly worn at summer regattas or formal garden parties, often with a ribbon in club, college or school colors.	
Bonnie hat	Boonie hat	A soft, wide-brimmed cotton hat commonly used by military forces. Also known as a bush hat and similar to a bucket hat.	
"Boss of the Plains"	Boss of the Plains	A lightweight all-weather hat, with a high rounded crown and wide flat brim, designed by John B. Stetson for the demands of the American frontier.	
Bowler / Derby	Bowler hat	A hard felt hat with a rounded crown created in 1850 by Lock's of St James's, the hatters to Thomas Coke, 2nd Earl of Leicester, for his servants. More commonly known as a Derby in the United States.	
Breton	Breton	A woman's hat with round crown and deep brim turned upwards all the way round. Said to be based on hats worn by Breton agricultural workers.	
Bucket hat	Bucket hat	A soft cotton hat with a wide, downwards-sloping brim.	
Buntal hat	Buntal hat	A straw hat from the Philippines made from very finely-woven buri palm leaf fibers. Also known as "balibuntal hat", "parabuntal hat", "East Indian Panama hat", or "Italian straw hat", among other names. Popular in the early 20th century and often mistaken for the Panama hat.	
Campaign (or "Smokey Bear") hat	Campaign hat	Also known as a "Smokey Bear" hat, or a Lemon Squeezer. A broad-brimmed felt or straw hat with high crown, pinched symmetrically at its four corners (the "Montana crease").	
Capotain hat	Capotain	A hat worn between the 1590s and 1640s in England and northwestern Europe. Also known as a "Pilgrim hat" in the United States.	
Capello romano	Cappello romano	A round wide-brimmed hat worn by more traditional Roman Catholic clergy.	
	Cartwheel hat	Wide-brimmed and shallow-crowned hat, normally worn at an angle. Popular from 1910s but most closely associated with 1940s-50s fashion.	
	Cavalier hat	A wide-brimmed hat popular in 17th-century Europe.	
Chupalla	Chupalla	A straw hat made in Chile.	
Cloche hat	Cloche hat	A bell-shaped woman's hat that was popular during the Roaring Twenties.	
Conical hat	Conical Asian hat	A conical straw hat associated with East and Southeast Asia. Sometimes known as a "coolie hat", although the term "coolie" may be interpreted as derogatory.	
Custodian helmet	Custodian helmet	A helmet traditionally worn by British police constables and sergeants while on foot patrol.	
	Damao	A traditional Chinese hat worn by men.There are many styles.	
	Fedora	A soft felt hat with a medium brim and lengthwise crease in the crown.	
	Humao	A brim hat traditionally used by Chinese men and women when riding horses.	
	Hardee hat	Also known as the 1858 Dress Hat. Regulation hat for Union soldiers during the American Civil War.	
	Gaitou hat	A traditional Chinese women's hat, also known as "mianyi". Women would wear it when riding horses, donkeys, or traveling in the cloth trade.	
	Gat	A traditional Korean hat worn by men.	
	Halo hat	Semi-circular or circular design that frames the face, creating a 'halo' or 'aureole' effect.	
	Homburg	A semi-formal hat with a medium brim and crown with a crease and no dents.	
	Jaapi	A traditional hat of Assam, India. Plain and decorative jaapis are available.	
	Kalpak	A traditional hat of Bulgaria, Turkey, Ukraine and Central Asia. Made primarily of lamb fur, it comes in a variety of regional styles.	
	Kova tembel	Cloth hat worn by Israeli pioneers and kibbutzniks.	
	Liangmao	A traditional Chinese women's hat.	
	Legionnaire	Designed to provide sun protection for the forehead, ears, and neck.	
	Mathal	Distinctive hat worn by farmers in the Bangladesh made of bamboo with a conical top.	
	Mortarboard	Flat, square hat. Usually has a button centered on top. A tassel is attached to the button and draped over one side. Worn as part of academic dress. Traditionally, when worn during graduation ceremonies, the new graduates switch the tassel from one side to the other at the conclusion of the ceremony.	
	Mushroom hat	Hat with a distinctly downward-facing brim similar to the shape of a mushroom or toadstool. Popular from the 1870s, but particularly associated with the Edwardian era and Dior's "New Look."	
	Panama	Straw hat made in Ecuador.	
	Picture hat	Also known as a Gainsborough hat and garden hat, this is an elaborate women's design with a wide brim.	
	Pith helmet	A lightweight rigid cloth-covered helmet made of cork or pith, with brims front and back. Worn by Europeans in tropical colonies in the 19th century. The pith helmet is an adaptation of the native salakot headgear of the Philippines.	
	Planter's hat	A lightweight straw hat, with a wide brim, a round crown and narrow round dent on the outside of the top of the crown. Worn by Clark Gable in Gone with the Wind, and Paul Bettany in Master and Commander.	
	Porkpie	Felt hat with low flat crown and narrow brim.	
	Sailor hat	A flat-crowned, brimmed straw hat inspired by nineteenth century sailors' headgear.	
	Shovel hat	A hat with low, round crown and a wide brim, which projected in a shovel-like curve at the front and rear and was often worn turned up at the sides. Formerly associated with the Anglican clergy.	
	Slouch	Generic term covering wide-brimmed felt-crowned hats often worn by military leaders. Less fancy versions can be called bush hats.	
	Sombrero	A Mexican hat with a conical crown and a very wide, saucer-shaped brim, highly embroidered made of plush felt.	
	Sombrero Cordobés	A traditional flat-brimmed and flat-topped hat originating from Córdoba, Spain, associated with flamenco dancing and music and popularized by characters such as Zorro.	
	Sou'wester	A traditional form of collapsible oilskin rain hat that is longer in the back than the front to protect the neck fully. A gutter front brim is sometimes featured.	
	Stetson	Also known as a "Cowboy Hat". A high-crowned, wide-brimmed hat, with a sweatband on the inside, and a decorative hat band on the outside. Customized by creasing the crown and rolling the brim.	
	Sun hat	A hat which shades the face and shoulders from the sun.	
	Top hat	Also known as a beaver hat, a magician's hat, or, in the case of the tallest examples, a stovepipe (or pipestove) hat. A tall, flat-crowned, cylindrical hat worn by men in the 19th and early 20th centuries, now worn only with morning dress or evening dress. Fictional characters such as Uncle Sam and Mr. Monopoly are often depicted wearing such hats. Once made from felted beaver fur.	
	Trilby	A soft felt men's hat with a deeply indented crown and a narrow brim often upturned at the back.	
	Tudor bonnet	A soft round black academic cap with a stiff brim that has a cord with tasseled ends knotted around the base of the crown, the ends draping over the brim.	
	Tyrolean hat	A felt hat with a corded band and feather ornament, originating from the Alps.	
	Umbrella hat	A hat made from an umbrella that straps to the head. Has been made with mosquito netting.	
	Vueltiao	A Colombian hat of woven and sewn black and khaki dried palm braids with indigenous figures.	
	Weimao	A traditional Chinese wide-brimmed hat with a shoulder-length veil.	
	Wideawake	A broad brimmed felt "countryman's hat" with a low crown.	

=== Caps ===
Includes caps with visor.

Image	Name	Description	Refs.
Ascot cap	Ascot cap	A hard style of hat, usually worn by men, dating back to the 1900s. Sometimes associated with livestock slaughter.	
Baseball cap	Baseball cap	A type of soft, light cotton cap with a rounded crown and a stiff, frontward-projecting bill.	
Budenovka	Budenovka	A soft, woolen hat covering the ears and neck, worn by Soviet troops from 1918 to 1940.	
	Casquette	A small-peaked cap often worn by cyclists.	
Cricket cap	Cricket cap	A type of soft cap traditionally worn by cricket players.	
	Flat cap	A soft, round wool or tweed men's cap with a small bill in front.	
	Gatsby	A soft brimmed hat popular in New York after the turn of the century made from eight quarter panels. Also known as a newsboy cap.	
	Green eyeshade	Once common-wear for office clerks.	
	Hard hat	A rounded rigid helmet with a small brim predominantly used in workplace environments, such as construction sites, to protect the head from injury by falling objects, debris and inclement weather.	
	Kepi	A generic worldwide military hat with a flat, circular top and visor. First seen in central Europe.	
	Mazepynka	A cap worn by Ukrainian intellectuals and soldiers since 1914, based on the portrait of Ivan Mazepa.	
	Newsboy cap	Casual-wear cap similar in style to the flat cap. Like a flat cap, it has a similar overall shape and stiff peak (visor) in front, but the body of the cap is rounder, fuller, made of eight pieces, and panelled with a button on top and often with a button attaching the front to the brim.	
	Patrol cap	Also known as a field cap, a scout cap, or in the United States a mosh cap; a soft cap with a stiff, rounded visor, and flat top, worn by military personnel in the field when a combat helmet is not required.	
	Peaked cap	A military style cap with a flat sloping crown, band and peak (also called a visor). It is used by many militaries of the world as well as law enforcement, as well as some people in service professions who wear uniforms.	
	Rogatywka	A characteristic field cap worn by partisans in World War II guerrilla fights as well by the officers of Polish armies.	
	Shako	A tall cylindrical military cap, usually with a visor, badge, and plume.	
	Sports visor	A crownless headgear similar to a baseball cap.	
	Student cap	A cap worn by university students in various European countries.	
	Trucker hat	Similar to a baseball cap, usually with a foam brim and front section and a breathable mesh back section.	
	Utility cover	An eight-pointed hat used by the US military branches within the United States Department of the Navy.	

=== Brimless ===
Includes brimless headgear.

Image	Name	Description	Refs.
Ayam	Ayam	A traditional Korean winter cap mostly worn by women in the Joseon and Daehan Jeguk periods (1392–1910).	
Balmoral bonnet	Balmoral bonnet	Traditional Scottish bonnet or cap worn with Scottish Highland dress.	
Barretina	Barretina	A floppy fabric pull-on hat, usually worn with its top flopped down. In red, it is now used as a symbol of Catalan identity.	
Skating beanie	Beanie	A brimless cap, with or without a small visor, once popular among schoolboys. Sometimes includes a propeller. Note: In New Zealand, Australia, the United Kingdom, Canada, and parts of the United States, "beanie" also or otherwise refers to the knit cap or tuque used during winter to provide warmth.	
Bearskin	Bearskin	A tall fur cap, usually worn as part of a ceremonial military uniform. Traditionally, the headgear of grenadiers, and remains in use by grenadier and guards regiments in various armies. Sometimes mistakenly identified as a busby.	
Beret	Beret	A soft round cap, usually of woollen felt, with a bulging flat crown and tight-fitting brimless headband. Worn by both men and women and traditionally associated with France, Basque people, and militaries.	
Bhaad-gaaule topi	Bhadgaunle Topi	A typical Nepali cap.	
Biretta	Biretta	A square cap with three or twelve ridges or peaks worn by Roman Catholic (and some Anglican and Lutheran) clergy.	
	Birke topi	A short flat cylindrical traditional hat of western Nepal, out of fashion, only worn on festivities such as "Bhanubhakta Acharya".	
	Blangkon	A traditional Javanese men's hat.	
"Börk"	Börk	A high cap wore by janissaries as a symbol of their devotion to their order in the Ottoman Empire.	
"Boudoir cap"	Boudoir cap	A type of decorative cap mainly worn in the 19th and early 20th century with sleepwear or lingerie.	
Busby	Busby	A small fur military hat.	
Guapimao	Guapi mao	A traditional Chinese skullcap for men.	
Capirotes	Capirote	A Christian pointed hat of conical form that is used in Spain and Hispanic countries by members of a confraternity of penitents, particularly those of the Catholic Church by the Nazarenos and Fariseos during Holy Week. In the United States, it is historically associated with the Ku Klux Klan.	
Caubeen	Caubeen	An Irish beret.	
Chenziguan	Jeongjagwan	A traditional horse hair hat dating back to 10th century China, which later became popular among the yangban of Joseon Dynasty Korea as an alternative to the gat.	
Chilcote cap	Chilote cap	A woven cap, typical of Chiloé Archipelago, that is made of coarse raw wool and usually topped by a pom-pom.	
Chullo	Chullo	Peruvian or Bolivian hat with ear-flaps made from vicuña wool, alpaca, llama or sheep's wool.	
Coonskin cap	Coonskin cap	A hat, fashioned from the skin and fur of a raccoon, that became associated with Canadian and American frontiersmen of the 18th and 19th centuries.	
Dhaka topi	Dhaka topi	A typical Nepali cap made up of fabric called dhaka, with hand-spun cotton inlay-pattern weaving.	
	Draped turban	A fashion dating back to at least the 18th century, in which fabric is draped or moulded to the head, concealing most or all of the hair. Original designs were said to be inspired by the turbans of India and the Ottoman Empire	
Dunce cap	Dunce cap	A conical hat, usually tall and narrow, worn by late-19th and early-20th century school pupils as a punishment and/or humiliation. It often featured a large capital "D" inscribed on its side, to be shown frontwards when the hat was worn.	
	Fascinator	A small hat commonly made with feathers, flowers and/or beads.	
	Fez	Red felt hat in the shape of a truncated cone.	
Mahatma Gandhi wearing Gandhi Cap in 1920	Gandhi cap	Typical cotton white cap named after Mahatma Gandhi 'father of nation' of India. Mostly worn by Indian politicians and people.	
	Garrison or Forage cap or side hat	A foldable cloth cap with straight sides and a creased or hollow crown.	
	Gaung Paung	Headwrap worn by the Bamar, Mon people, Rakhine and Shan peoples.	
	Glengarry	A traditional Scottish boat-shaped hat without a peak made of thick-milled woollen material with a toorie on top, a rosette cockade on the left, and (usually) ribbons hanging down behind. It is normally worn as part of Scottish military or civilian Highland dress.	
	Half hat	Millinery design that covers only half the head – particularly popular in the 1950s.	
	Hennin	A woman's hat of the Middle Ages. This style includes the conical "princess" hats sometimes seen in illustrations of folk-tale princesses.	
	Icelandic tail-cap	Part of the national costume of Iceland.	
	Karakul	A hat made from the fur of the Karakul breed of sheep, typically worn by men in Central and South Asia.	
	Keffiyah or Ghutrah	Three piece ensemble consisting of a Thagiyah skull cap, Gutrah scarf, and Ogal black band.	
	Kippah or Yarmulke	A close-fitting skullcap worn by religious Jews.	
	Kłobuk	A traditional headpiece worn by Polish highlanders: a tall felt highlander’s hat, traditionally worn by the leader of a band of mountain brigands.	
	Kofia	Brimless cylindrical cap with a flat crown, worn by men in East Africa.	
	Kolah namadi	A felt hat, typically worn by men in the rural areas of Iran.	
	Kołpak	A traditional Polish-Lithuanian Commonwealth nobleman’s fur hat, with a cut in the front forming two horns, decorated with an emblem and a feather between them. The fur on the inside and the fabric on the outside.	
	Kolpik	A cylindrical brown fur hat traditionally worn by some Hassidic rabbis.	
	Kufi	A brimless, short, rounded cap worn by Africans and people throughout the African diaspora.	
	Kupiah	Traditional cap from Aceh.	
	Liuheyitong mao	The traditional Chinese men's hat. Guapi mao evolved from it.	
	Labbadeh	A conical brimless felt cap, traditionally worn by Lebanese men in rural areas.	
	Lika cap	A cylindrical flat wool headgear in dyed red top and black rim, with tassels in the back, traditionally worn in Lika in Croatia.	
	Makapili Hat	Bamboo basket worn over the head covering the entire head with just holes for the eyes and worn by some members of the Makapili, Filipinos who were Japanese collaborators during World War II in the Philippines.	
	Mitre	Distinctive hat worn by bishops in the Roman Catholic Church, Eastern Orthodox Church, and the Anglican Communion.	
	Mobcap	A round, gathered or pleated cloth bonnet worn indoors, or outdoors under a hat, by women in the 18th and 19th centuries.	
	Montenegrin cap	A cylindrical flat wool headgear in dyed red top and black rim, traditionally worn in Montenegro.	
	Montera	A crocheted hat worn by bullfighters.	
	Pakul	Round, rolled wool hat with a flat top, common in Pakistan and Afghanistan.	
	Papakha	Also known as astrakhan hat in English, a male wool hat worn throughout the Caucasus.	
	Party hat	A conical hat, similar to the dunce cap, often worn at birthday parties and New Year's Eve celebrations. It is frequently emblazoned with bright patterns or messages.	
	Peach basket hat	A woman's hat resembling an upturned fruit basket. Usually lavishly trimmed, it achieved notoriety in the early 1900s.	
	Phrygian cap	A soft conical cap pulled forward. In sculpture, paintings and caricatures it represents freedom and the pursuit of liberty. The popular cartoon characters The Smurfs wear white Phrygian caps.	
	Pilgrim's hat	A pilgrim's hat, cockel hat or traveller's hat is a wide brim hat used to keep off the sun. It is highly associated with pilgrims on the Way of St. James. The upturned brim of the hat is adorned with a scallop shell to denote the traveller's pilgrim status.	
Actress Doris Day wearing a pillbox hat in 1960	Pillbox hat	A small hat with straight, upright sides, a flat crown, and no brim.	
The Carpenter in Lewis Carroll's Through the Looking-Glass wears a printer's hat.	Printer's hat	Traditional, box-shaped, folded paper hat, formerly worn by tradesmen such as carpenters, masons, painters and printers.	
	Qeleshe	A white brimless felt cap traditionally worn by Albanians. Also known as a plis or qylaf.	
	Rastacap	A tall, round, usually crocheted and brightly colored, cap worn by Rastafarians and others with dreadlocks to tuck their locks away.	
Sailor cap	Sailor cap	Also known as "gob hat" or "gob cap." Worn in several navies, of white canvas with an upright brim.	
	Sailor cap	A round, flat visorless hat worn by sailors in many of the world's navies	
	Šajkača	Serbian national and traditional hat worn by men.	
	Salakot	A traditional hat in the Philippines.	
	Sami hat	Also known as a "Four Winds" hat, traditional men's hat of the Sami people.	
	Santa Hat	A floppy pointed red hat trimmed in white fur traditionally associated with Christmas.	
	Shtreimel	A fur hat worn by married Hassidic men on Shabbat and holidays.	
	Smoking cap	A soft cap, shaped like a squat cylinder or close fitting like a knit cap, and usually heavily embroidered with a tassel on top worn by men while smoking to stop their hair from smelling of tobacco smoke.	
	Songkok/Kopiah/Kupiah/Kopeah	A cap widely worn in Indonesia, Brunei, Malaysia, Singapore, the southern Philippines and southern Thailand, mostly among Muslim males.	
	Šubara	A conical or cylindrical shaped headgear predominantly of black lamb/sheep fur, worn in the Balkans.	
	Tam o' Shanter	A Scottish wool hat originally worn by men.	
	Taqiyah	A round fabric cap worn by Muslim men.	
	Tengkolok	A traditional Malay, Indonesian and Bruneian male headwear. It is made from long songket cloth folded and tied in particular style (solek).	
	Telpek	A traditional Turkmenistani headgear of sheepskin and fur.	
	Toque	A tall, pleated, brimless, cylindrical hat traditionally worn by chefs. Also called a "chef's hat".	
	Tubeteika	A round, slightly pointed cap with embroidered or applique patterns worn throughout Central Asia.	
	Tuque	In Canada, a knitted hat, worn in winter, usually made from wool or acrylic. Also known as a woolly hat, ski cap, knit hat, knit cap, sock cap, stocking cap, or watch cap. Sometimes called a toboggan or goobalini in parts of the USA. In New Zealand, Australia, the United States and the United Kingdom, the term "Stocking Cap" is applied to this cap.	
	Turban	A headdress consisting of a scarf-like single piece of cloth wound around either the head itself or an inner hat.	
	Upe	A Bougainvillean headdress made from tightly wound straw.	
	Ushanka	A Russian fur hat with fold-down ear-flaps.	
	Wushamao	A traditional Chinese hat. Primarily worn by men. It was one of the hats worn by Chinese officials. It also spread to many of China's vassal states, where it was worn by local officials.	
	Whoopee cap	A skullcap made from a man's felt fedora hat with the brim trimmed with a scalloped cut and turned up.	
	Widow's cap	A cap worn by women after the death of their husbands.	
A bearded white man in bright purple and gold robes smiles towards the camera. On his head, a tall pointed purple cap emblazoned with silver and gold stars, moons, and crowns.	Wizard/witch hat Pointed hat	A conical hat with a wide brim and a crooked top, traditionally associated with fictional wizards or witches.	
	Yishan Guan	A traditional Chinese men's hat. Emperors and princes often wore them. They also spread to many tributary states in China, where they were worn by local kings.	
	Zhanjiao Futou	A traditional Chinese hat. It is one style of headwear called "Futou". Primarily worn by men, specifically by officials.The emperor also wore this hat.	
	Zucchetto	Skullcap worn by clerics typically in Roman Catholicism.	

=== Other ===
Image	Name	Description	Refs.
	Baishamao	A traditional Chinese men's hat popular among the royal family and aristocracy.	
Bicorne	Bicorne	A broad-brimmed felt hat with brim folded up and pinned front and back to create a long-horned shape. Also known as a cocked hat. Worn by European military officers in the 1790s and, as illustrated, commonly associated with Napoleon.	
Busby	Bycocket	A wide brimmed hat that is turned up in the back and pointed in the front like a bird's beak. Traditionally associated with the character Robin Hood.	
Coal scuttle bonnet	Coal scuttle bonnet	A woman's bonnet with stiffened brim and a flat back (crown).	
Deerstalker	Deerstalker	A warm, versatile, often close-fitting tweed cap, with brims front and behind and ear-flaps that can be tied together either over the crown or under the chin. Originally designed for use while hunting in the climate of Scotland. Occasionally worn by – and so closely associated with – the character Sherlock Holmes, rarely in the original stories or their illustrations, but often in films.	
A Buddhist monk wearing a takuhatsugasa.	Kasa	Any one of several traditional Japanese hats. Examples include amigasa and jingasa.	
	Poke bonnet	A woman's bonnet with a small crown and wide and rounded front brim.	
	Tricorne	A soft hat with a low crown and broad brim, pinned up on either side of the head and at the back, producing a triangular shape. Worn by Europeans in the 18th century. Larger, taller, and heavily ornamented brims were present in France and the Papal States.	

== See also ==
- List of headgear
- List of fur headgear
