= Beth Wiseman (author) =

American writer from Texas

Beth Wiseman is an American writer of romance fiction from Texas.

== Career ==
Wiseman is an Amish romance author, and her books have sold more than two million copies.

She is contracted with Harper Collins Christian Publishing.

== Recognition ==
Her novels have been on the ECPA (Evangelical Christian Publishers Association) Bestseller List and the CBA (Christian Book Association) Bestseller List.

She received the Carol Award in 2011 and 2013.

Her first book "Seek Me With All Your Heart" was selected as the 2011 Women of Faith Book of the Year. The book was a part of "The Land of Canaan" series.

In 2013 she received the Holt Medallion.

She's been honored with eleven journalism awards, and won first place news writing for The Texas Press Association. She's also worked as a humor columnist for The 1960 Sun in Houston.

== Works ==
=== Daughters of Promise ===
- Plain Perfect (2008)
- Plain Pursuit (2009)
- Plain Promise (2009)
- Plain Paradise (2010)
- Plain Proposal (2011)
- Plain Peace (2013)
- Daughters of the Promise Box Set Volumes 1-3 (omnibus) (2009)
- The Daughters of the Promise Collection (omnibus) (2013)
- The Complete Daughters of the Promise Collection (omnibus) (2014)

=== Land of Canaan ===
- Seek Me with All Your Heart (2010)
- The Wonder of Your Love (2011)
- His Love Endures Forever (2012)
- Seek Me with All Your Heart / The Wonder of Your Love (omnibus) (2012)
- The Land of Canaan Collection (omnibus) (2015)

=== Amish Secrets ===
- Her Brother's Keeper (2013)
- Love Bears All Things (2016)

=== Amish Year ===
- A Love for Irma Rose (2015)
- Patchwork Perfect (2015)
- An Amish Year (2015)

=== Surf's Up ===
- A Tide Worth Turning (2015)
- Message In A Bottle (2016)
- A Tide Worth Turning / Message In a Bottle (2016)

=== Novels ===
- Divine Freefall (2000)
- Need You Now (2012)
- The House that Love Built (2012)
- The Promise (2014)

=== Omnibus ===
- An Amish Christmas (2009) (with Barbara Cameron, Kathleen Fuller and Kelly Long)
- Plain Perfect / Quaker Summer (2009) (with Lisa Samson)
- An Amish Love (2010) (with Kathleen Fuller and Kelly Long)
- Healing Hearts (2010)
- An Amish Wedding (2011) (with Kathleen Fuller and Kelly Long)
- An Amish Kitchen (2012) (with Amy Clipston and Kelly Long)
- An Amish Miracle (2013) (with Mary Ellis and Ruth Reid)
- A Beth Wiseman Amish Collection (2014)
- An Amish Cradle (2015)

=== Novellas ===
- A Change of Heart (2012)
- A Choice to Forgive (2012)
- A Recipe for Hope (2013)
- A Perfect Plan (2013)
- Always Beautiful (2013)
- In His Father's Arms (2015)

=== Series contributed to ===
- Amish Gathering (with Barbara Cameron and Kathleen Fuller)
- An Amish Gathering (omnibus) (2009)

=== Year of Weddings ===
- A July Bride (2014)
- A Year of Weddings (2014) (with Debra Clopton, Katie Ganshert, Rachel Hauck, Denise Hunter, Meg Moseley, Deborah Raney, Betsy St Amant, Kathryn Springer, Beth K Vogt, Marybeth Whalen and Lenora Worth)
- Summer Brides (omnibus) (2015) (with Debra Clopton and Marybeth Whalen)
- Amish Garden:
- An Amish Garden (omnibus) (2014) (with Vannetta Chapman, Kathleen Fuller and Tricia Goyer)
- Rooted in Love (2014)

=== Amish Second Christmas ===
- An Amish Second Christmas (omnibus) (2014) (with Kathleen Fuller, Tricia Goyer and Ruth Reid)
- When Christmas Comes Again (2014)

=== Amish Harvest ===
- An Amish Harvest (omnibus) (2016) (with Vannetta Chapman, Amy Clipston and Kathleen Fuller)
- Under the Harvest Moon (2016)
