= Coal scuttle bonnet =

Woman's bonnet with a stiffened brim and flat back

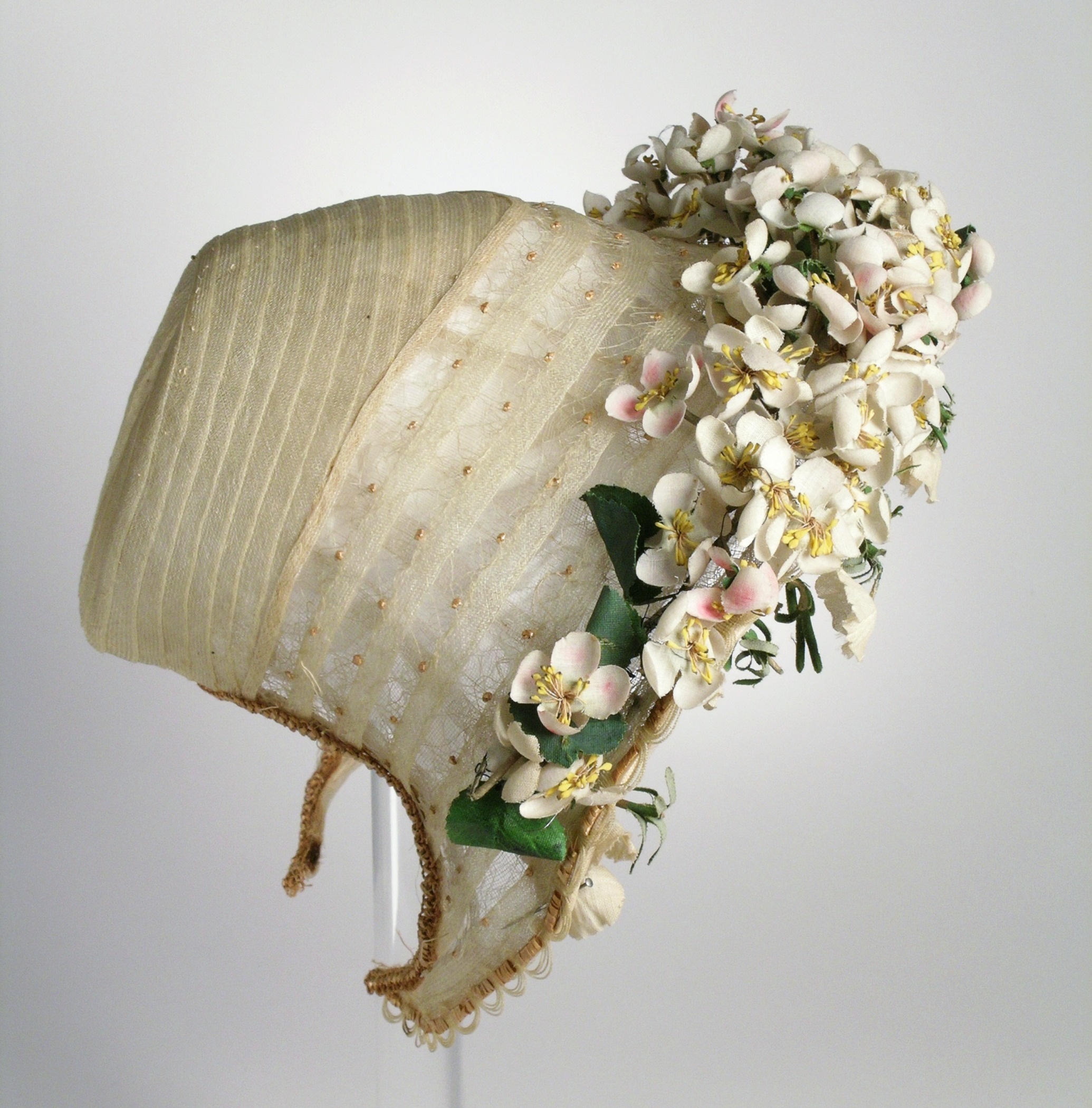
American wedding bonnet of coal-scuttle shape at the Los Angeles County Museum of Art

A coal scuttle bonnet (sometimes referred to as a coal-scuttle bonnet or sugar scoop bonnet) is a design of bonnet with stiffened brim and a flat back (crown). The name originates from its similarity to the shape of a traditional coal storer. It may be very similar in design to the poke bonnet – some sources use the terms interchangeably – however the poke shape had a wide and rounded front brim that extended beyond the face, according to fashion historian Mary Brooks Picken, while the Metropolitan Museum of Art notes that the poke generally shielded the face and had a wide brim that provided a large surface for decoration.

== History of the design ==
Some sources say that the elongated bonnet with flattened back was popular from the mid 1850s, however the fashion predates this since it is mentioned in Nicholas Nickleby (published 1838), as worn by Miss Snevellici, leading lady of Crummies Troop, who glances out "from the depths" of her headgear, described as a coal-scuttle bonnet. An even earlier version minus the flattened crown, dating from circa 1810 and described as a coal-scuttle shape, is part of the Victoria and Albert Museum archive.

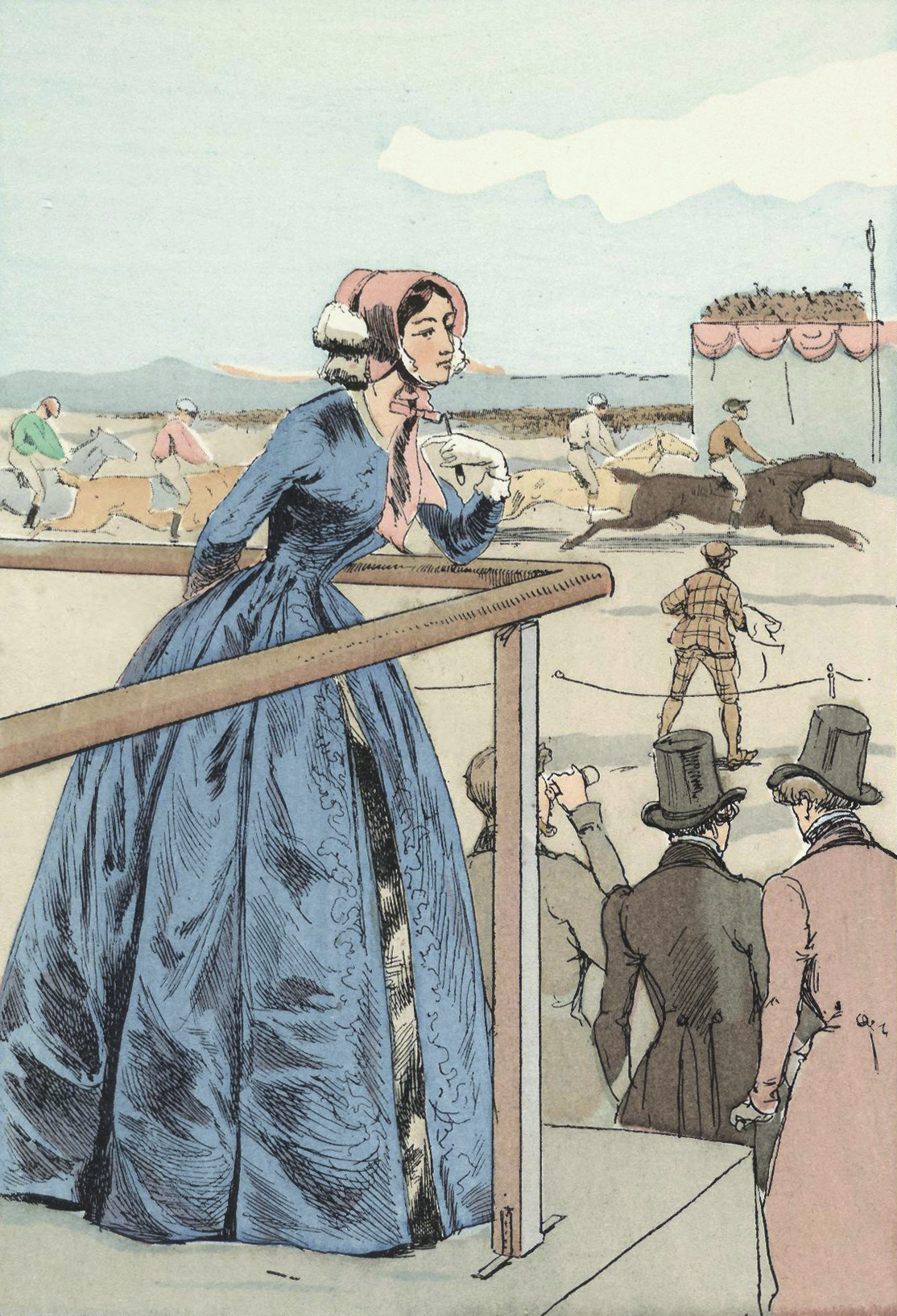
1848 Parisian illustration showing a bonnet in the coal scuttle shape

This style of fashion spread far and wide during the 1840s; an 1843 letter to The Times, reprinting in full private letter to England from a chaplain in New Zealand, described a congregation of Māori worshippers who had adopted some elements of London dress: "Fancy a fat old woman, with a coal-scuttle-bonnet on her head, her face inside very much tattooed, with a bright scarlet shawl, a very fanciful printed gown, white cotton stockings, and showy sandals. This was a great chieftainesse".

By the 1850s, according to the Metropolitan Museum of Art, exaggerated styles of poke and coal scuttle bonnet had fallen out of favour, to be replaced by softer styles that framed the face and showed off more of the hair. A reduced size also enabled lighter materials and trimmings to be used.

Variations on the style appear to have persisted in millinery fashion into the 1890s; a fashion commentator in the Milwaukee Journal commenting on New York fashion bemoaned the imminent return of the elongated bonnet design, saying: "Just how long will it be before we see the coal scuttle bonnet with its hideous green veil I cannot tell, but I fear it will not be very long as I have found three bonnets of the most pronounced of that ugly type, only of course worn smaller than those worn before". The new styles she described had a lace veil that could be worn forward or thrown back over the hat.

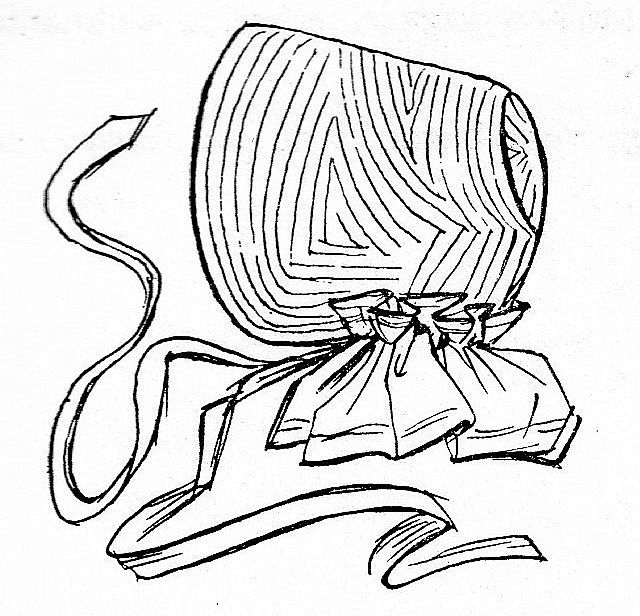
The coal-scuttle shape was adapted to create the traditional Afrikaans sun bonnet the kappie

=== Cultural and religious adaptations ===
A variation on the traditional stiffened coal-scuttle shape was the kappie (from the Dutch kapje), an Afrikaans word for a women's sun-bonnet.

This style of bonnet was also worn by some American Quaker women during the 19th century and is also similar to the Salvation Army bonnet that was first worn in 1880. The Salvation Army design was created by one of the cadets training at the Salvation Army's Hackney college – a milliner called Annie E. Lockwood – who customised hats sold by local merchants to create the distinctive headgear. Later, the Salvation Army style of bonnet would have a fashion revival in the 1920s and 1930s – notably being redefined by the studio of Caroline Reboux in spring 1938.

== See also ==
- List of hat styles
- Poke bonnet
- Salvation Army bonnet
