= Bonnet (headgear) =

Large semicircular head covering framing the face; alternatively, a brimless hat or cap

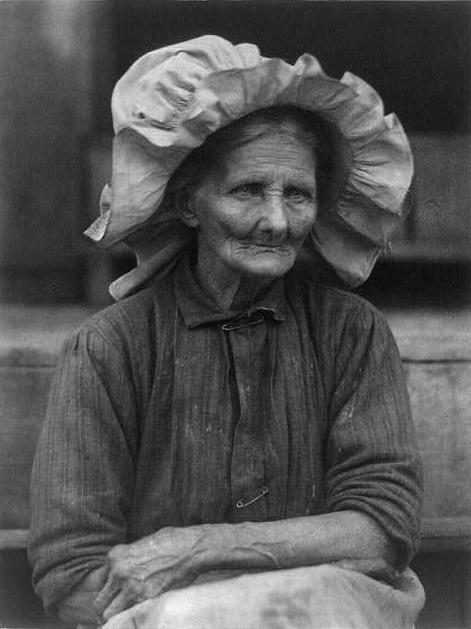
Old woman in sunbonnet (c. 1930). Photograph by Doris Ulmann

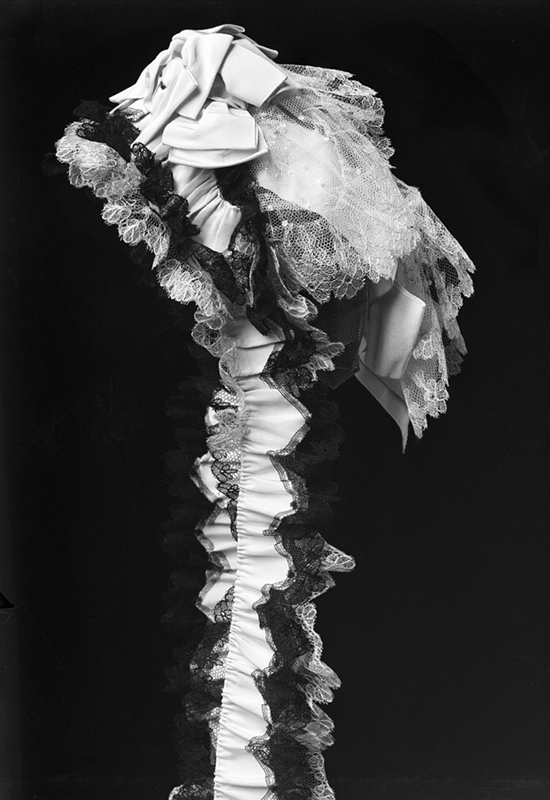
A bonnet decorated with lace and tulle from the 1880s

Bonnet has been used as the name for a wide variety of headgear for women since the Middle Ages. As with "hat" and "cap", it is impossible to generalize styles for which the word has been used, there is a tendency to describe it having soft material and lacking a brim, or at least one all the way round, rather than just at the front. Yet the term has also been used, for example, for steel helmets in Scotland (1505), where it has long been especially popular.

Headgear tied under the chin with a string is especially likely to be called a bonnet. Other features associated with bonnets as opposed to hats are that the forehead is not covered, but the back of the head often is. The outdoor headgear of female servants and workers is more likely to be called a bonnet. It is often worn outside over a thinner everyday head covering, worn at all times. Hats are typically stiffer, worn on the top of the head with the crown and brim roughly horizontal, while bonnets are pushed back, covering the back of the head, with any brim often approaching the vertical at the front. Other types of bonnet might otherwise be called "caps", for example the Scottish blue bonnet worn by working-class men and women, a kind of large floppy beret.

Bonnet derives from the same word in French, where it originally indicated a type of material. From the 18th century, bonnet headgear, previously worn by elite women informally at home (as well as more generally by working women), became adopted as high fashion, and until at least the late 19th century, bonnet was the dominant term used for female hats. In the 21st century, only a few specialized kinds of headgear are still called bonnets, commonly those worn by babies and the feather bonnets of Scottish Highland regiments, as well as the war bonnets of North American Plains Indians. In addition, bonnets are worn by women as an outer Christian headcovering in some denominations such as the Amish, Mennonite and Brethren churches among the Anabaptist branch of Christianity, and with Conservative Quakers, mainly in the Americas.

== Women ==
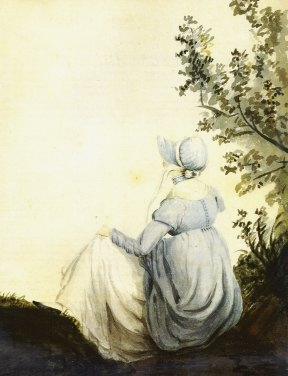
1804 watercolour of Jane Austen wearing a bonnet, by her sister, Cassandra.

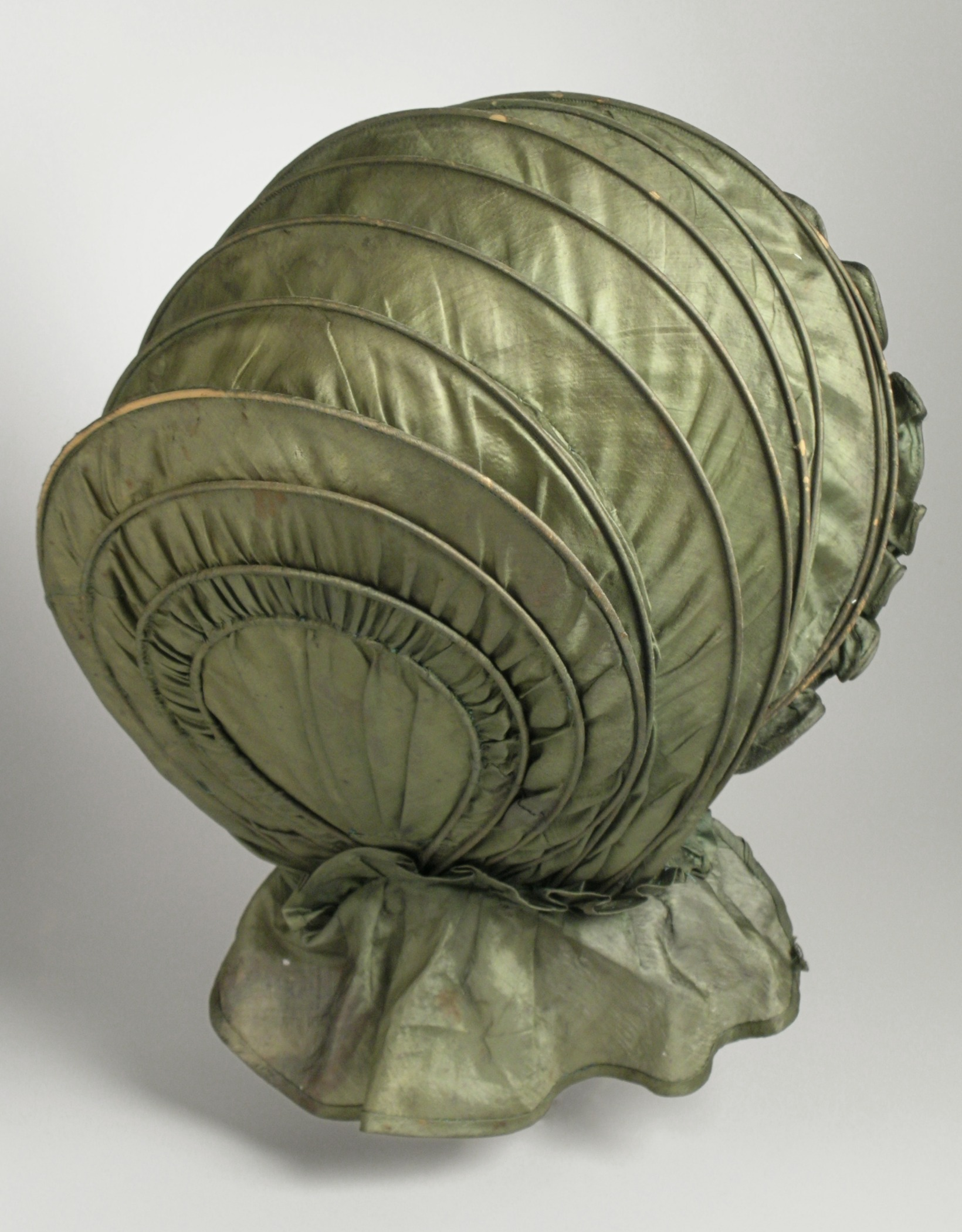
Woman's Calash, c.1825. Green silk. Los Angeles County Museum of Art collection, M.87.93

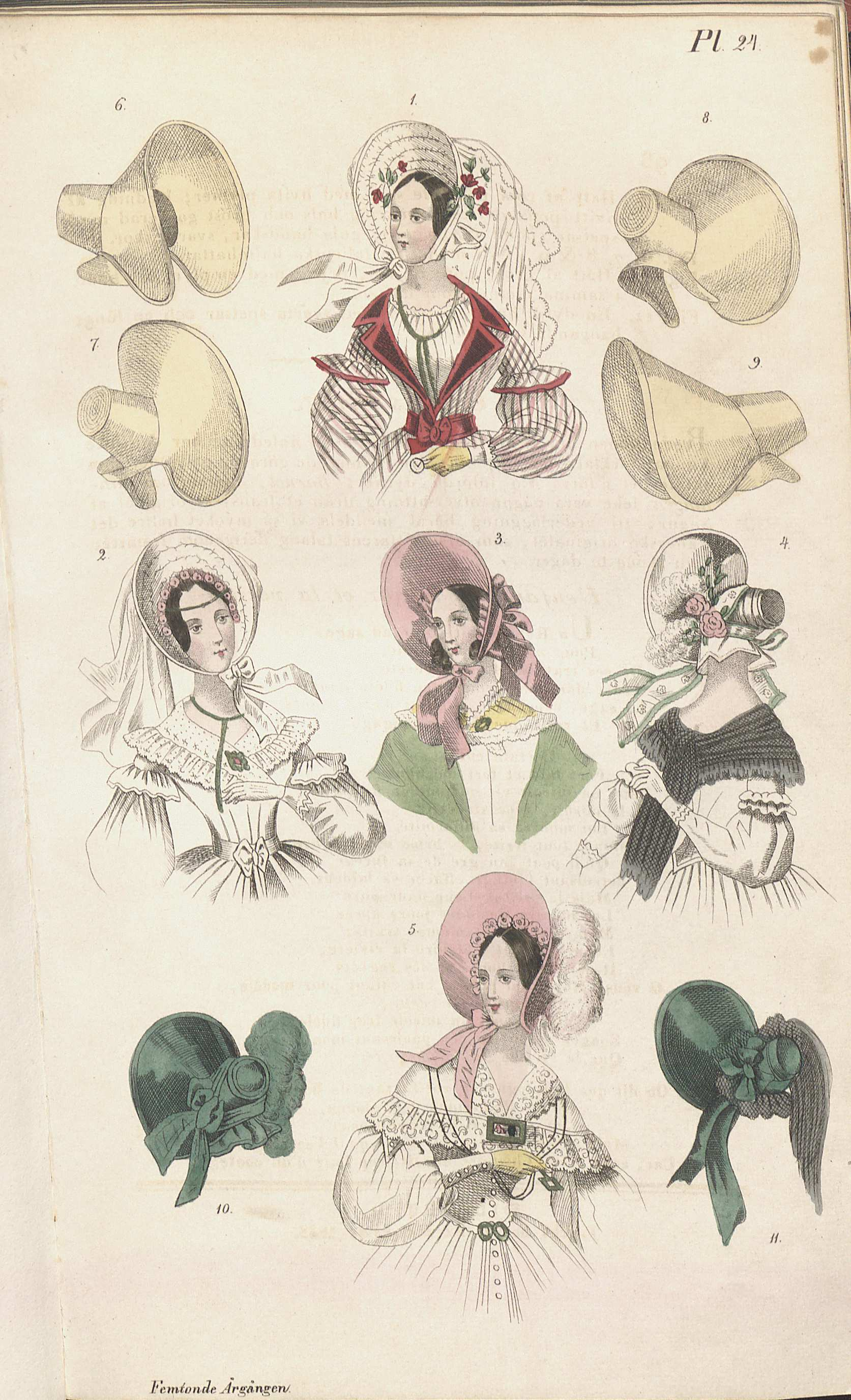
Bonnets in a Swedish fashion plate from 1838.

Until the late 19th century bonnet seems to have been the preferred term for most types of hats worn by women, while hat was more reserved for male headgear, and female styles that resembled them, typically either in much smaller versions perched on top of the head, or versions with very wide brims all the way round. In the mid-17th and 18th century house bonnets worn by women and girls were generally brimless headcoverings which were secured by tying under the chin, and which covered no part of the forehead. They were worn both indoors and outdoors, to keep the hair tidy, to keep dust or flour out of the hair while working, and in accordance with the Christian Bible passage 1 Corinthians 11. With society hairstyles becoming increasingly elaborate after 1770, the calash was worn outdoors to protect hair from wind and weather: a hood of silk stiffened with whalebone or arched cane battens, collapsible like a fan or the calash top of a carriage, they were fitted with ribbons to allow them to be held secure in a gale.

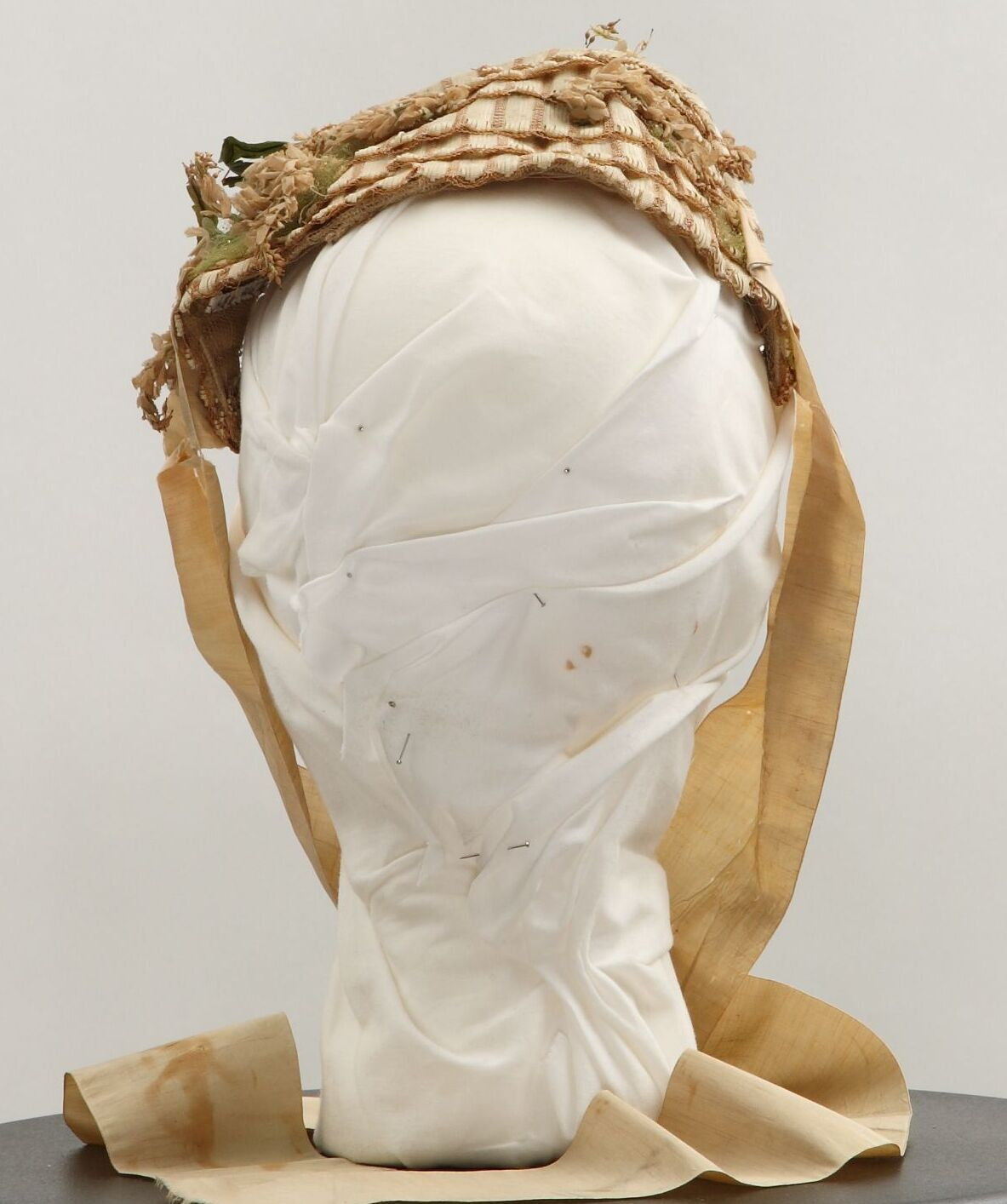
Ladies' bonnet with layers of straw, sprays of beige colored flowers and green leaves, and ties of beige silk ribbon.

From about 1815, increasingly structured and fashionable bonnets made by milliners grew larger and less functional among the upper classes. A plate in La Belle Assemblée 1817 showed a

Bonnet of vermillion-coloured satin, embossed with straw, ornamented slightly with straw-coloured ribbands (ribbons), and surmounted by a bouquet formed of a full blown damask rose and buds, with ears of ripe corn. This ornament is partially placed on one side: the edge of the bonnet finished by blond [lace] laid on strait.

This was specified as a carriage dress, with the understanding that when "taking the air" in an open carriage, the bonnet provided some privacy—such a bonnet was called an invisible in Paris—and prevent wind-chapping, with its connotations of countrified "rude" health. Straw was available again after 1815: the best straw bonnets came from Leghorn. As a bonnet developed a peak, it would extend from the entire front of the bonnet, from the chin over the forehead and down the other side of the face. Some styles of bonnets between ca 1817 and 1845 had a large peak which effectively prevented women from looking right or left without turning their heads: a coal-scuttle or poke bonnet. Others had a wide peak which was angled out to frame the face. In the 1840s it might be crimped at the top to frame the face in a heart shape. As the bonnet became more complicated, under it might be worn a lace cornette to hold the hair in place.

The lack of a clear distinction between hats and bonnets can be seen in these extracts from Harper's Bazaar in 1874: (On "Paris Fashions", by Emmeline Raymond, 11 April) "There is no change in bonnets. So long as the hair is piled on top of the head, the little device which takes the place of a dress cap must remain as it is. The brims are generally flattened at the sides, swelling above the front, and turned up behind in order to make room for the hair, which would not find room whereon to lodge if the precaution were not taken, here and there, to punch out what is called a brim of what is called a bonnet. It is said, however, that straw hats of the Pamela shape are in preparation, that is, turned up behind, but shading the forehead. It would be so very sensible to wear a bonnet that would protect the face from the sun that I give this news with due caution. For my part, I can not believe it, as little of practical, functional purpose remains in bonnet design." A week before, ("New York Fashions", 4 April): "Strings are now seldom seen, and this does away with the last distinguishing feature between bonnets and round hats; the same head-covering now serves for each, as it is a bonnet when worn far back on the head, and a hat when tilted forward."

Bonnets remained one of the most common types of headgear worn by women throughout most of the 19th century. Especially for a widow, a bonnet was de rigueur. Silk bonnets, elaborately pleated and ruched, were worn outdoors, or in public places like shops, galleries, churches, and during visits to acquaintances. Women would cover their heads with caps simply to keep their hair from getting dirty and perhaps out of modesty, as informed by Christian religious norms. In addition, women in wedlock would wear caps and bonnets during the day, to further demonstrate their status as married women.

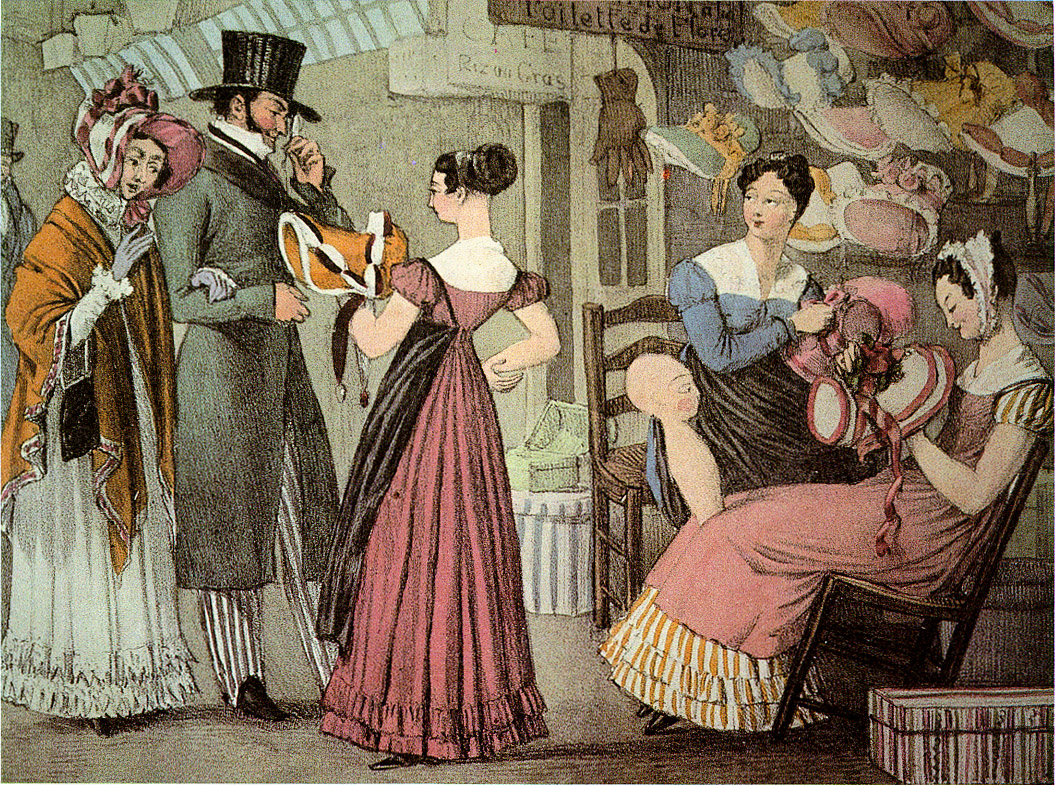
A millinery shop in Paris, 1822

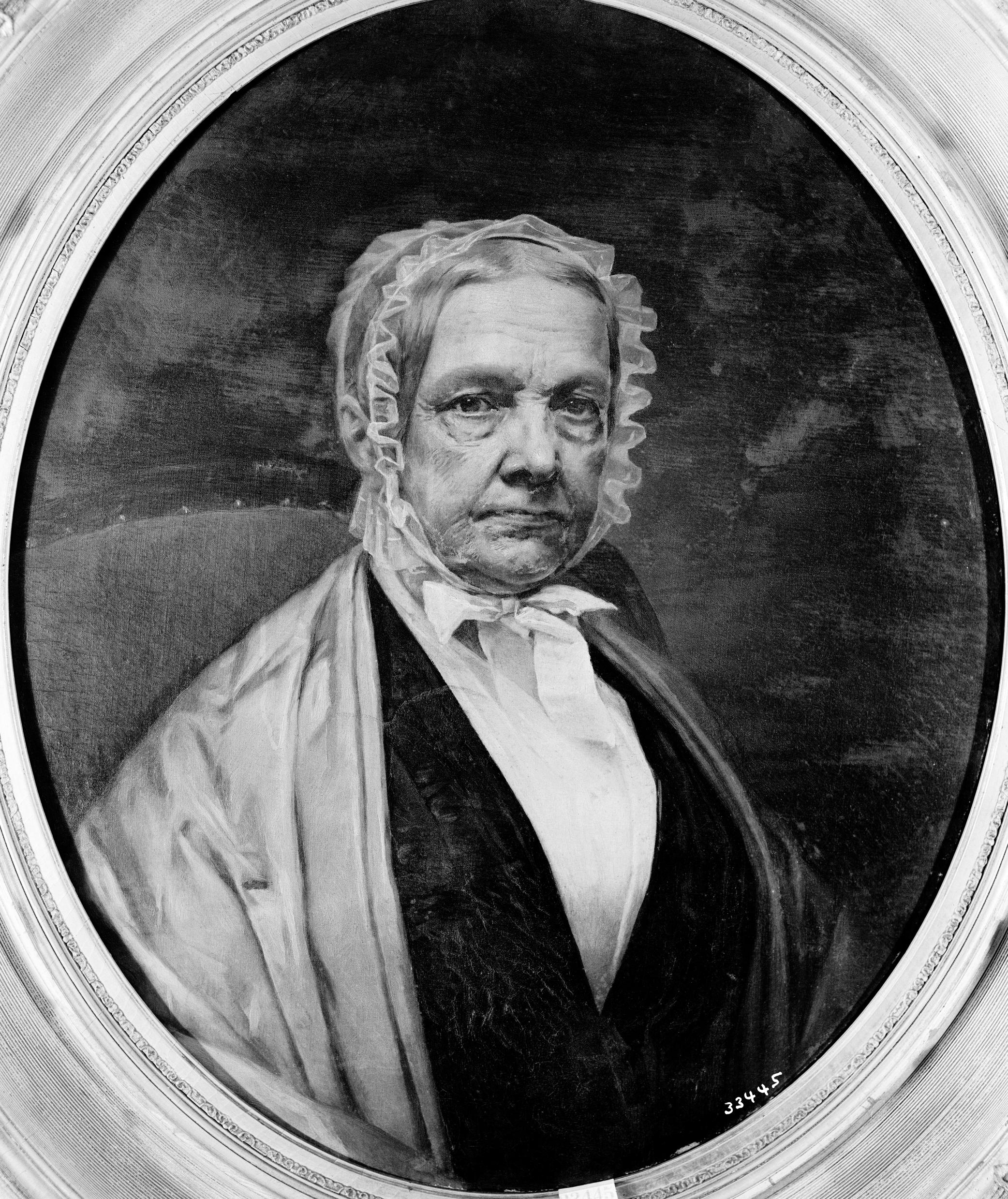
This portrait from 1860 features a bonnet.

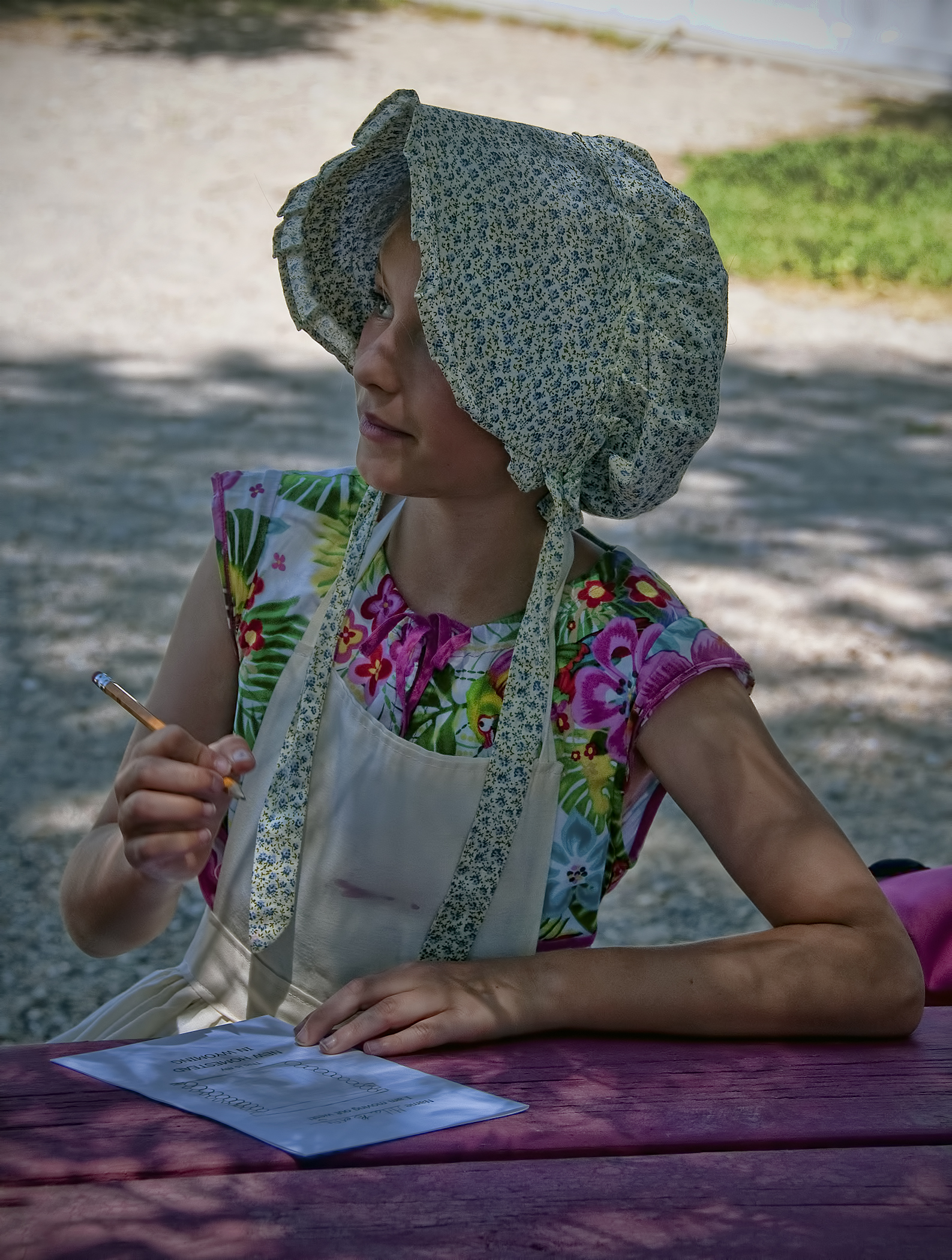
A calico sunbonnet

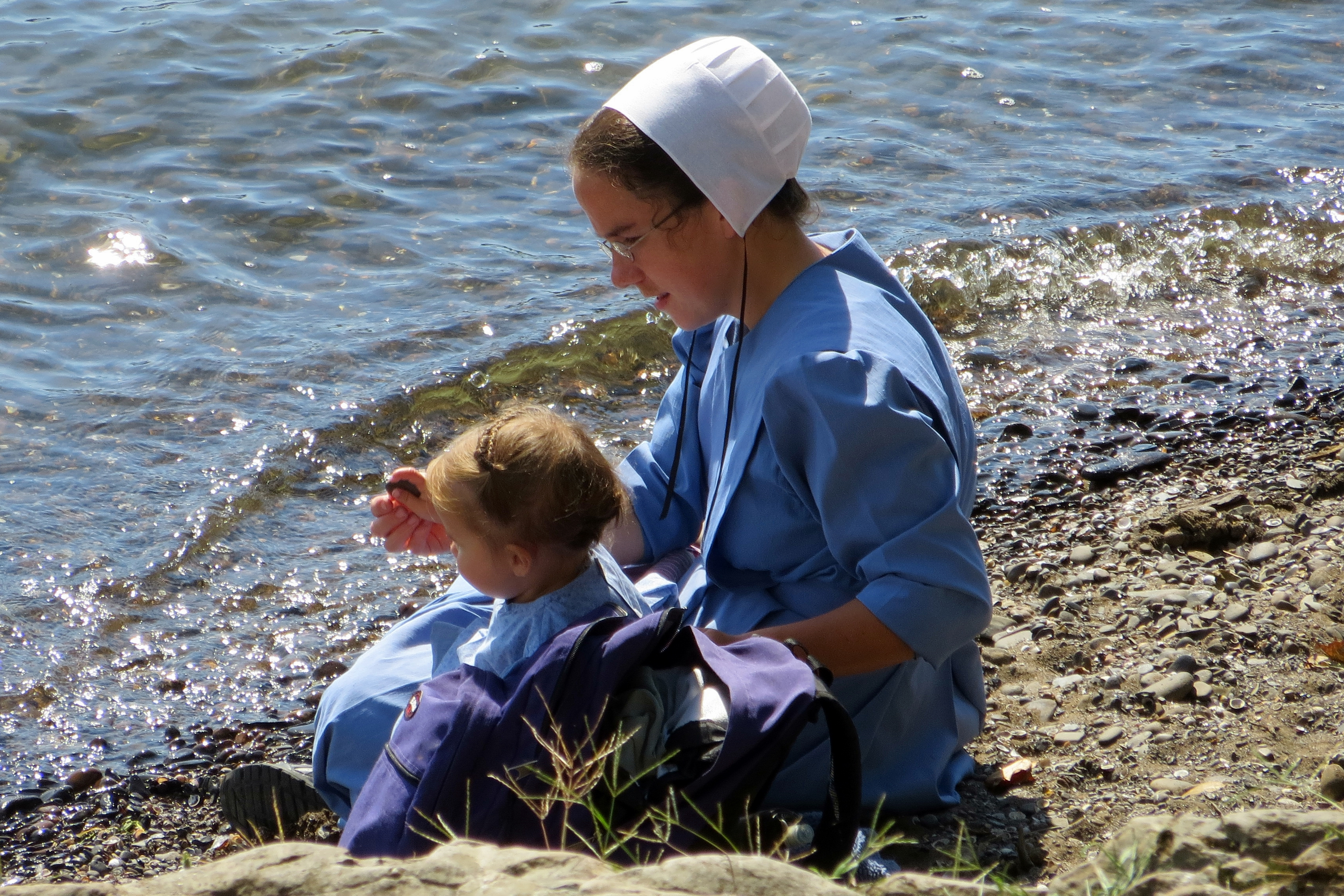
Many Anabaptist women wear head coverings, kapps and bonnets

Under the French Second Empire, parasols took the place of headgear for protection from sun, and bonnets became smaller and smaller, until they could only be held on the head with hatpins. As hats came back into style, bonnets were increasingly worn by women who wanted to appear modest in public, with the result that bonnets accumulated connotations of dowager wear and were dropped from fashion, except out on the prairies or country wear.

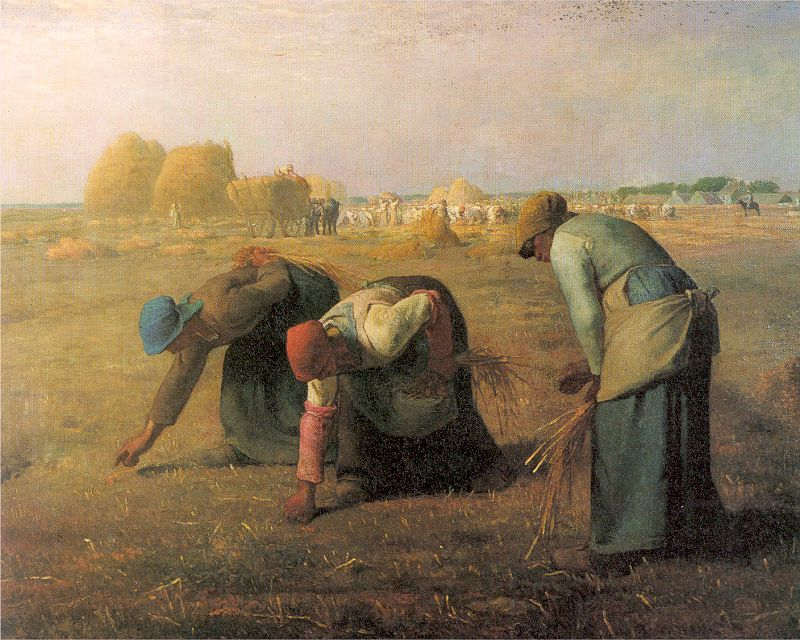
The Gleaners, by Jean-François Millet, 1857: a cloth bonnet substitutes for a head kerchief

Most middle-class women in the 19th century would have had at least two bonnets, one suitable for summer weather, often made from straw, and one made from heavier fabric for winter wear. This is where the tradition of an Easter bonnet originated, when women would switch from their winter bonnet to their summer bonnet. Wealthier women would have many bonnets, suitable for different occasions.

Women of some religious groups have continued to wear bonnets for worship or everyday clothing. This is especially the case among Anabaptist Christianity (Old Order Mennonites, Schwarzenau Brethren, River Brethren, Amish) and other plain people, such as plain-dressing Conservative Friends (Quakers). Bonnets were adopted by the Salvation Army based on 1 Corinthians 11, as part of uniform for women. Initially, Salvation Army bonnets were introduced as symbolic and representative protection for women and were reinforced with black tar to turn them into physical helmets to protect against the projectiles thrown by pagans. Later versions were smaller when there was no longer any need for protection. The bonnet has since been replaced with a bowler hat.

In France, single women wore elaborate yellow and green bonnets to honor St. Catherine's Day on November 25. The French expression coiffer Sainte-Catherine ('don St. Catherine's bonnet'), an idiom that describes an unmarried woman of 25 years or older, derives from this custom.

Enslaved women shipped from Africa, who traditionally wore African head dress in their native countries, were given European styles of bonnets. The enslaved working household tasks they were often given bonnets of a traditional European maid style, while the enslaved in the field wore hand-tied sunbonnets. These head bonnets were preferred by the masters for hygiene, while also offering protection from the sun.

== Men ==
The word bonnet for male headgear was generally replaced in English by cap before 1700, except in Scotland, where bonnet and the Scots language version bunnet remained in use, originally for the widely worn blue bonnet, and since then for military headgear, like the feather bonnet (not to be confused with those worn by Native Americans, for which bonnet was also used), Glengarry, Kilmarnock and Balmoral. The Tudor bonnet remains part of the academic regalia of some universities, and is not unlike the male bonnet of the 16th century.

Bonnet is also the term for the puffy velvet fabric inside the coronet of some male ranks of nobility, and "the affair of the bonnets" was a furious controversy in the France of Louis XIV over the mutual courtesies due between the magistrates of the Parliament de Paris and the Dukes of France.

The Scotch bonnet pepper was named for its resemblance to a bonnet worn by men in Scotland in the past, as it has a pom pom at the top which distinguishes it from men's and women's bonnets.

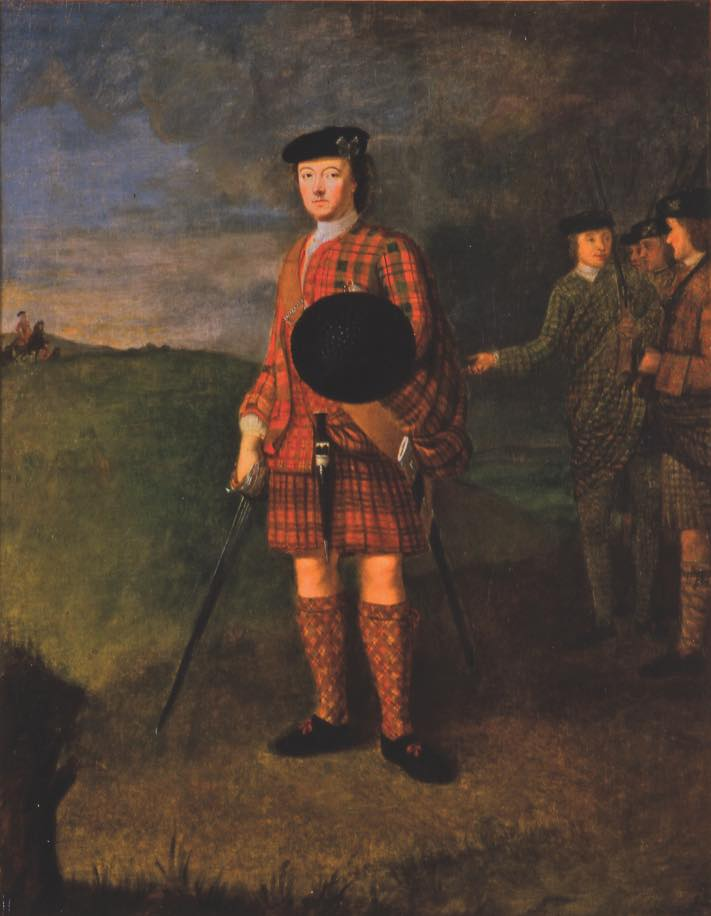
The Scottish blue bonnet as a sign of Jacobite allegiance, here worn by Lord George Murray

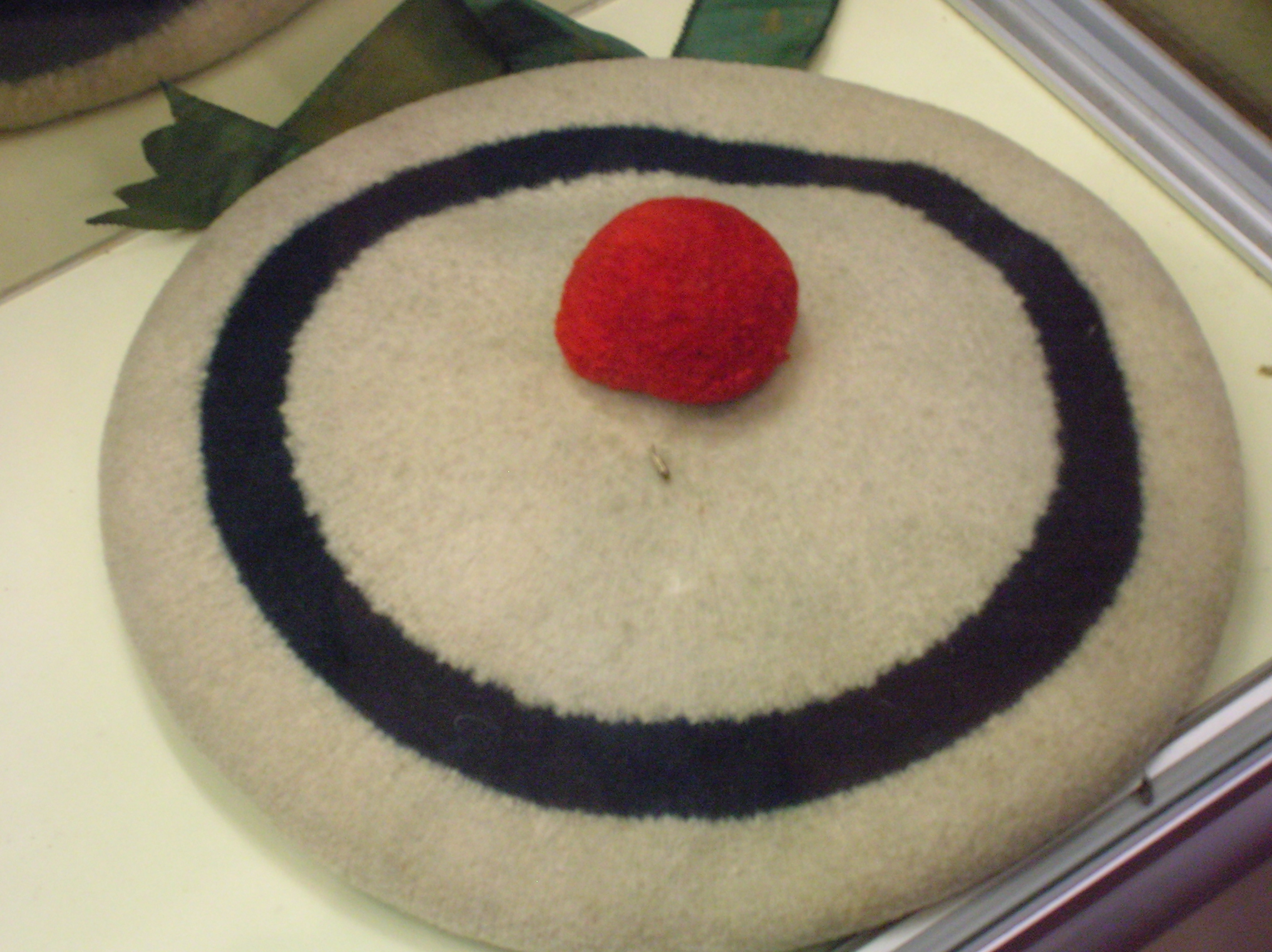
The traditional bonnet of the Kilwinning Archers of Scotland

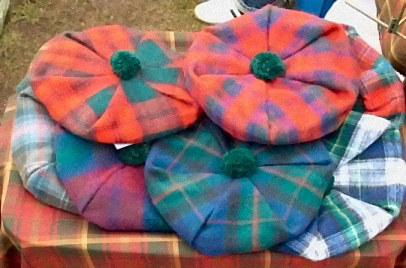
Various tam o' shanters

== Babies ==
The most common modern bonnet is a soft headcovering for babies. Its shape is similar to that of some kinds of bonnets that women used to wear: it covers the hair and ears, but not the forehead. While a bonnet may be a fashion choice by caregivers for a baby's headgear, it may also be used for sun protection, since an infant's skin is more vulnerable to sunburn than an adult's.

Crocheted baby bonnet with a ribbon tie

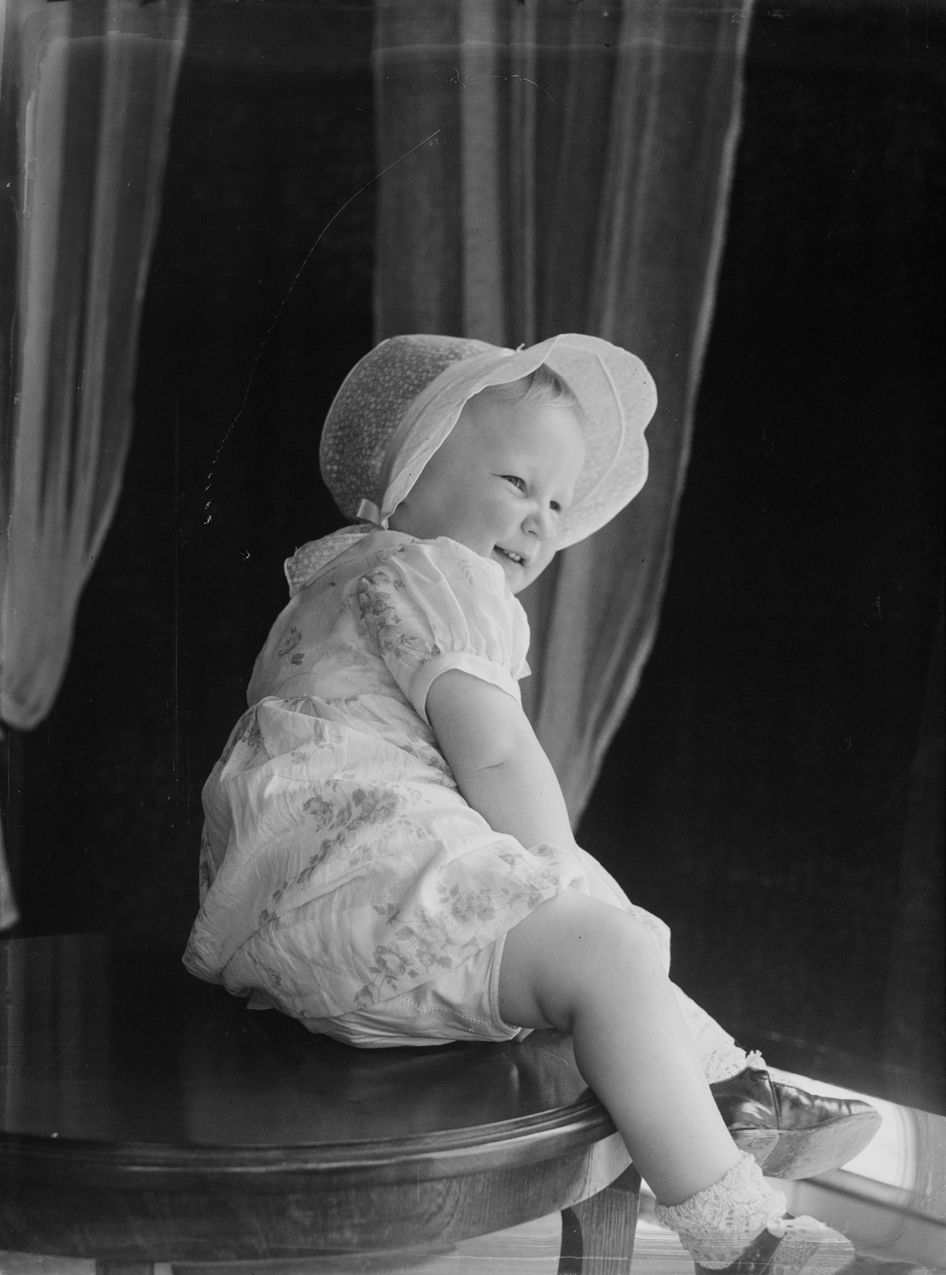
Baby wearing a sunbonnet

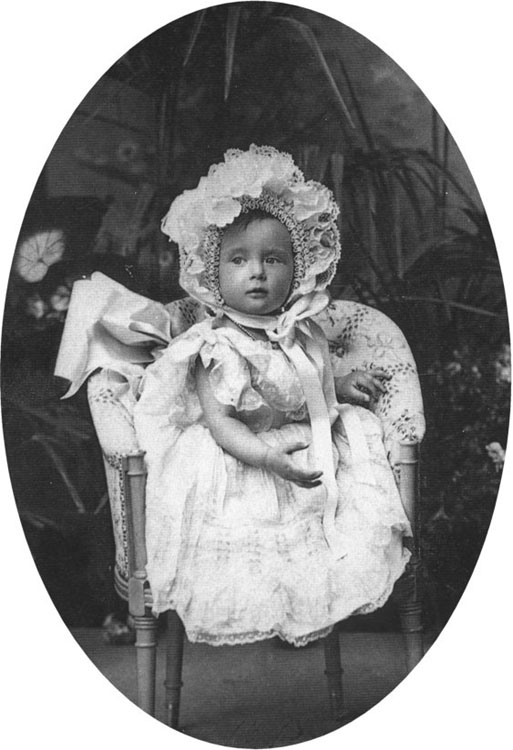
Grand Duchess Tatiana Nikolaevna of Russia in 1898 in a grand bonnet

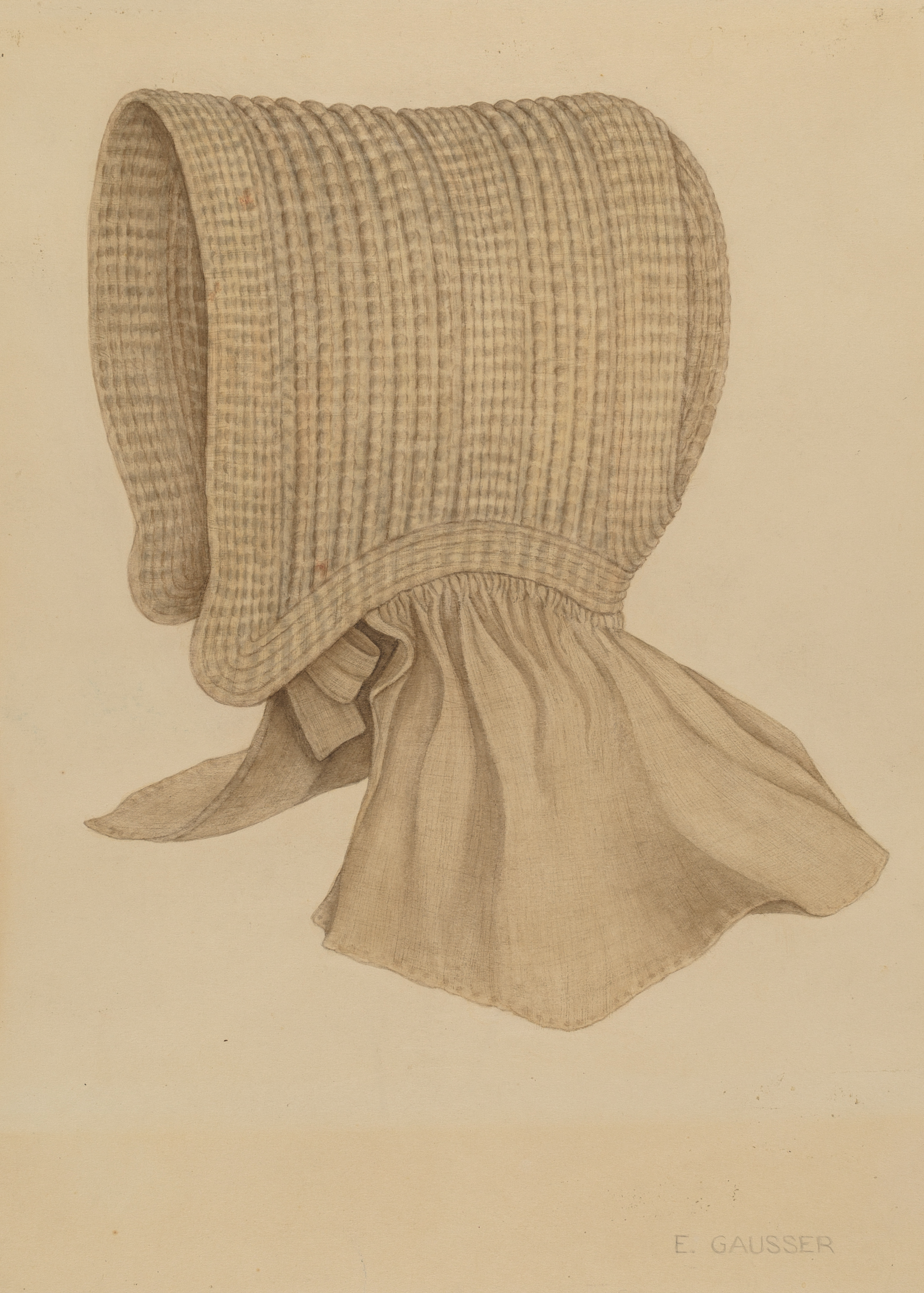
Eleanor Gausser, Quaker's Baby Bonnet, c. 1937

== Modern times ==
Modern bonnets are often made of silk or satin to preserve one’s hairstyle while asleep or lying down. They maintain a similar shape to bonnets that were popular in the 1960s. But it is more likely that these styles of headdress originated from the use of shower caps due to their appearance and application in salons.

It can also be worn with French maid costumes.

Bonnets are also used in alternative fashion communities such as lolita fashion.

== See also ==
- List of hat styles
- Salvation Army bonnet
- Poke bonnet
- Coal scuttle bonnet
- Balmoral bonnet - Scotland
