= Kathleen Fuller =

American writer

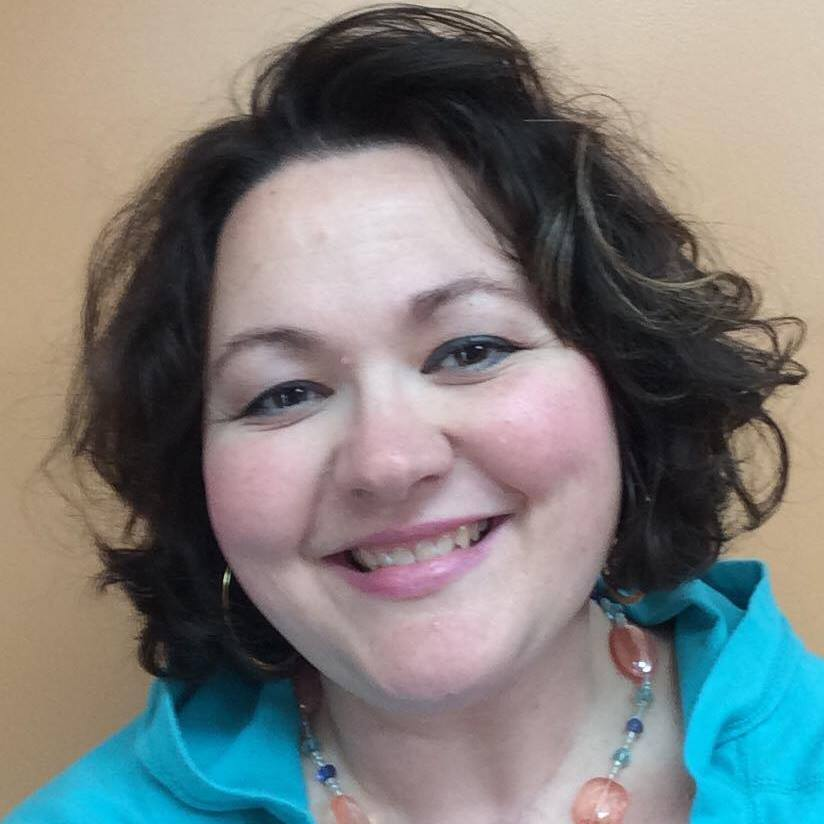
- Born: September 11, 1967 (age 59); Little Rock, Arkansas, U.S.
- Spouse: James Fuller
- Writing career
- Genres: Amish, Historical, and Contemporary Romance
- Notable works: Reluctant Bride; A Faith of Her Own
- Website: www.kathleenfuller.com

Kathleen Fuller (born September 11, 1967) is an American writer, specializing in Christian and Amish romantic fiction. She was born in New Orleans, Louisiana, grew up in Little Rock, Arkansas and currently resides in Geneva, Ohio with her husband, James Fuller, and three children.

== Biography ==
As a stay-at-home mother of three Kathleen Fuller became enamored with Christian fiction. She started writing in 2000, and a year after published her first short story. By 2003, she published her first novella, "Encore, Encore" and by 2004, Kathleen would release her first full-length novel, Santa Fe Sunrise under Avalon. Since then Kathleen has authored several short stories, novellas, novels, and some freelance non-fiction works.

Kathleen's break out year came when Thomas Nelson Publishers offered her several opportunities to write and participate in a series of Amish romance novels. In 2009, Kathleen's novel, A Man of His Word, was released and became a CBA and ECPA bestseller. Kathleen followed that with the successful release of the anthology An Amish Christmas featuring her novella "A Miracle for Miriam." The anthology would go on to become a CBD, CBA, and ECPA Bestseller.

== Novels ==
- Never Broken (Everlasting Faith Book 1), 2015, Mountain Brook Ink
- A Reluctant Bride (Amish of Birch Creek), 2015, Thomas Nelson
- A Faith of Her Own (Middlefield Amish), 2015, Thomas Nelson
- Letters to Katie (A Middlefield Family Novel), 2013, Thomas Nelson
- Faithful to Laura (A Middlefield Family Novel), 2012, Thomas Nelson
- Hide and Secret (Mysteries of Middlefield #3), 2011, Tommy Nelson
- Treasuring Emma (A Middlefield Family Novel), 2011, Thomas Nelson
- What the Heart Sees: A Collection of Amish Romances, 2011, Thomas Nelson
- The Secrets Beneath (Mysteries of Middlefield #2), 2010, Thomas Nelson
- A Hand to Hold (Hearts of Middlefield #3), 2010, Thomas Nelson
- A Summer Secret (Mysteries of Middlefield #1), 2010, Thomas Nelson
- An Honest Love (Hearts of Middlefield #2), 2010, Thomas Nelson
- A Man of His Word (Hearts of Middlefield #1), 2009, Thomas Nelson
- A Daring Escape, 2009, Avalon Books
- A Clever Disguise, 2008, Avalon Books
- A Brilliant Deception, 2008, Avalon Books
- Never Broken, 2006, Premium Press America
- San Antonio Sunset, 2006, Avalon Books
- San Francisco Serenade, 2006, Avalon Books
- Special Assignment, 2005, Avalon Books
- Santa Fe Sunrise, 2004, Avalon Books

== Novellas ==
- A Heart Full of Love in An Amish Cradle: An Amish Cradle Novella, 2015, Thomas Nelson
- Flowers for Rachael in An Amish Garden: An Amish Garden Novella, 2014, Thomas Nelson
- The Calling in A Pioneer Christmas, 2013, Barbour Books
- What the Heart Sees in An Amish Love, 2010, Thomas Nelson
- A Miracle for Miriam in An Amish Christmas: December in Lancaster County, 2009, Thomas Nelson
- A Place of His Own in An Amish Gathering, 2009, Thomas Nelson
- Christmas Legacy in A Christmas Homecoming, 2003, Tyndale
- Encore, Encore in Chance Encounters of the Heart, 2003, Tyndale
