= Cloche hat =

Close-fitting hats with a bell-shaped crown

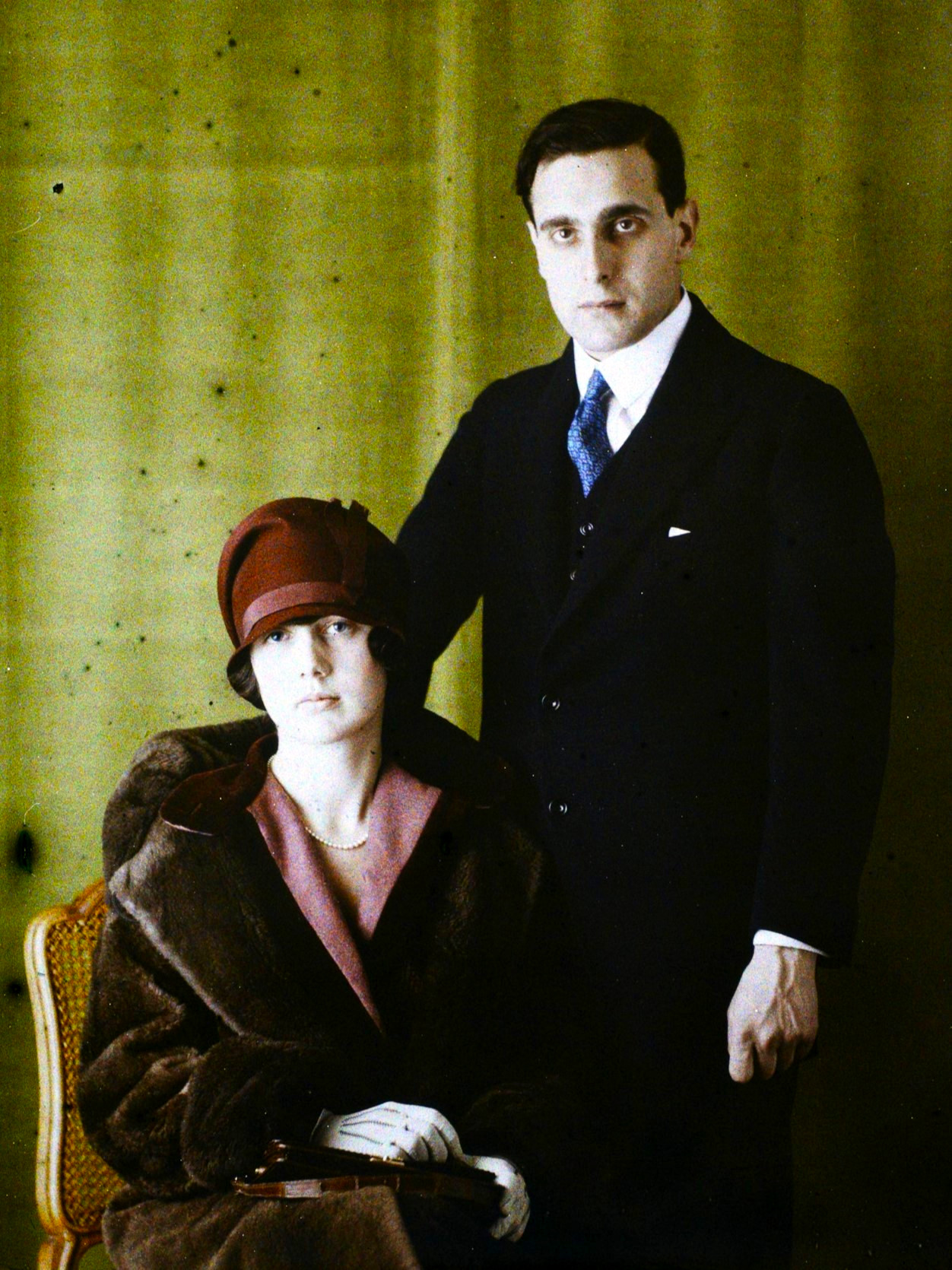
Cloche hat as worn by Eva Maria Warburg, autochrome dated 1926

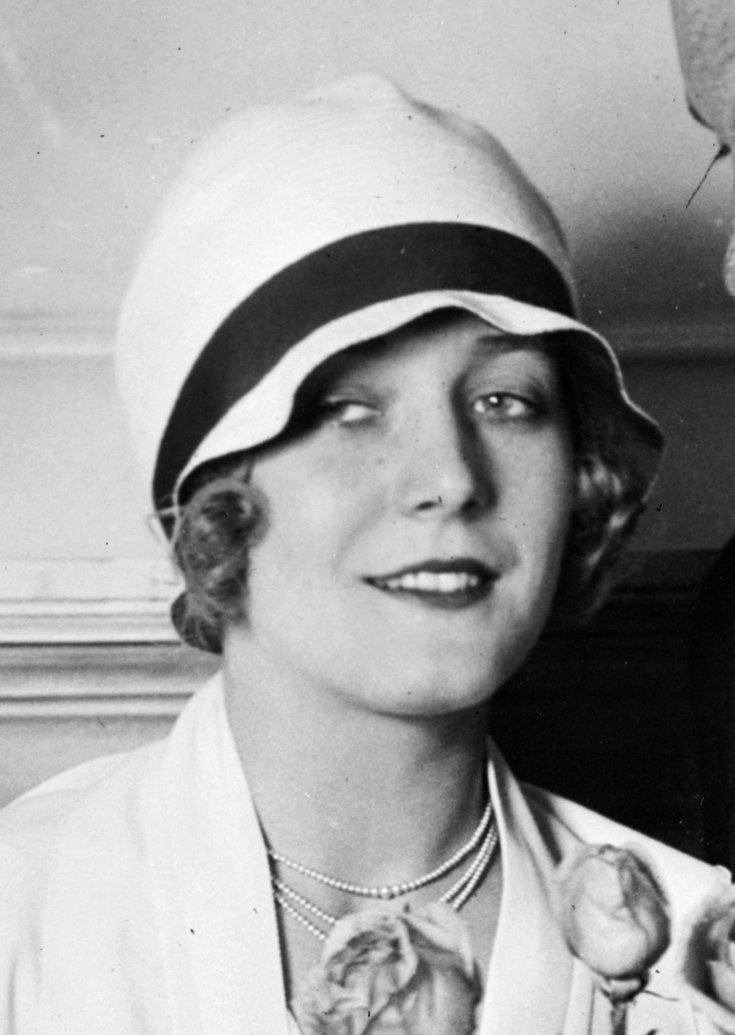
Cloche hat as worn by silent film star Vilma Bánky, 1927

The cloche hat or simply cloche is a fitted, bell-shaped hat for women that was invented in 1908 by milliner Caroline Reboux. They were especially popular from about 1922 to 1933. Its name is derived from cloche, the French word for "bell".

The popularity and influence of cloche hats was at its peak during the early twentieth century. Couture houses like Lanvin and Molyneux opened ateliers to join milliners in manufacturing hats that precisely matched their clothing designs. The hats even shaped hairstyles: the Eton crop – the short, slicked-down cut worn by Josephine Baker – became popular because it was ideal to showcase the hats' shape.

== Design ==
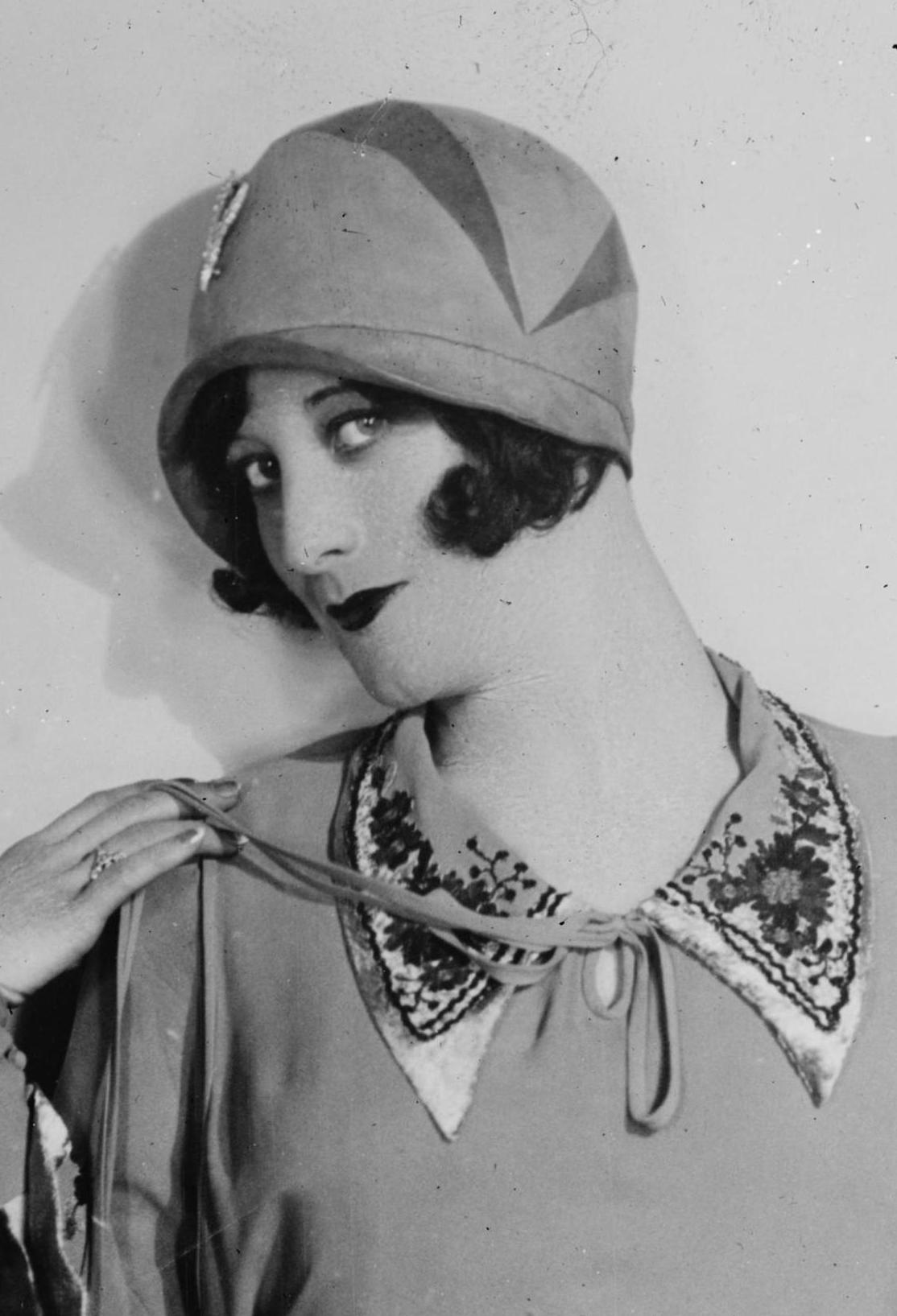
Joan Crawford in a cloche, 1927

Cloche hats were usually made of felt so that they conformed to the head, and were typically designed to be worn low on the forehead, with the wearer's eyes only slightly below the brim. In later years, a summer cloche might be made from sisal or straw. Cloches could also be made of beads or lace for evening wear, for cocktails, dancing or even for bridal wear.

The contemporaneous Art Deco style often influenced the outline of the brim or the style of seams. While commonly worn plain, allowing the cut and shape of a well-made hat to take precedence, a cloche could be decorated with appliqués, embroidery, jeweled brooches, scarves, fans of feathers, or similar accents. By the end of the 1920s, it became fashionable to turn the brims on cloche hats upwards. This style remained prevalent until the cloche hat went out of fashion around 1933 or '34.

Often, different styles of ribbons affixed to the hats indicated different messages about the wearer. Several popular messages included: An arrow-like ribbon which indicated a girl was single but had already given her heart to someone, a firm knot which signaled marriage or a flamboyant bow which indicated the wearer was single and interested in mingling.

== Later fashion ==
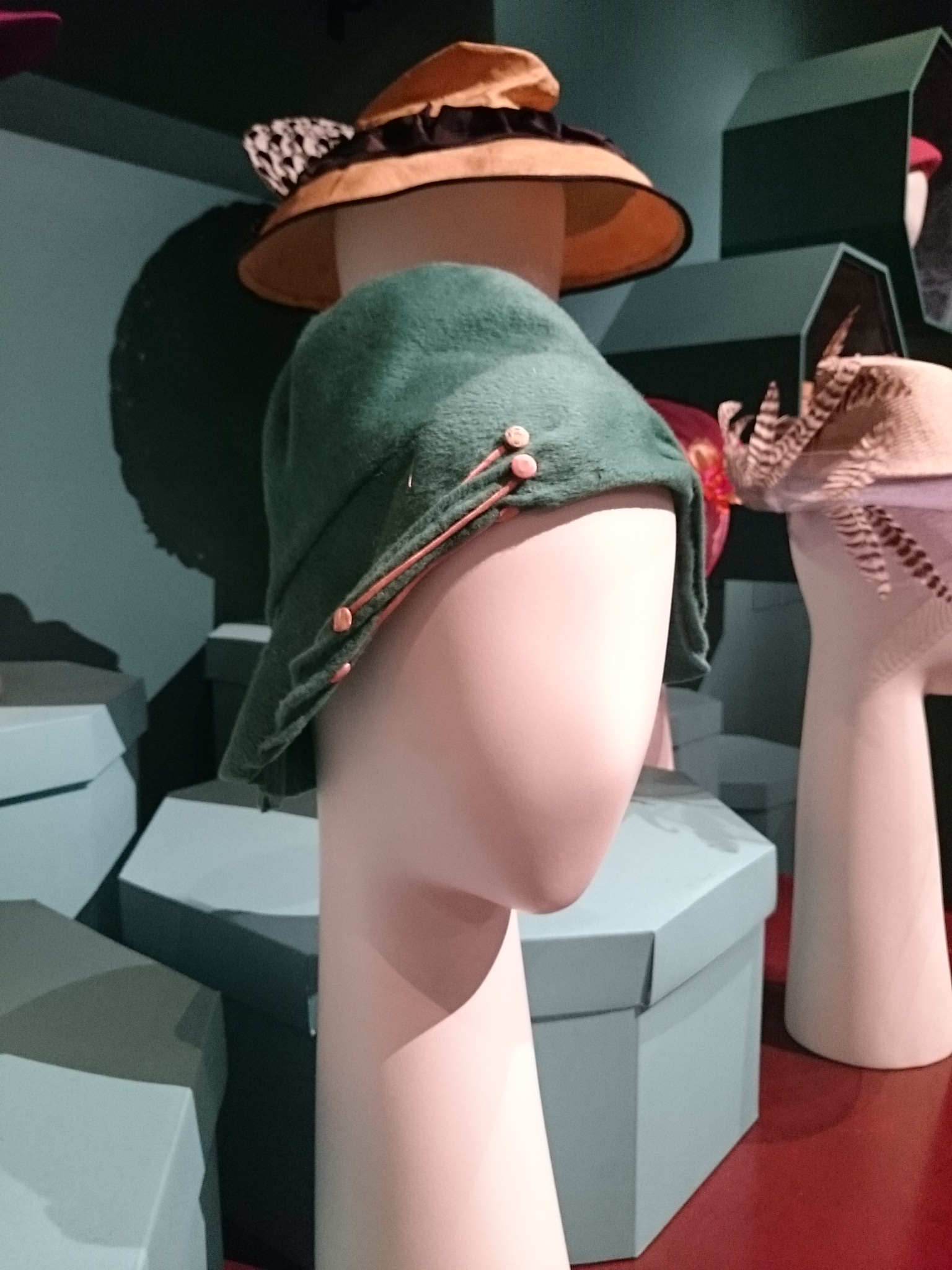
Close fitting bell shaped hat. Made with felt, silk and metal. Created by Gertrude Southam (milliner), circa 1930.

The cloche enjoyed a second vogue in the 1960s. In the late 1980s, newly invented models of the cloche, such as Patrick Kelly's version with a buttoned brim, made a minor resurgence.

Cloche hats were also featured in the Fall 2007 collections of many designers; Elle magazine called the cloche hat the "haute accessory of the moment" in its September 2007 issue.

== See also ==
- List of hat styles
- Mushroom hat
- Salvation Army bonnet
