= Poke bonnet =

Type of women's headgear

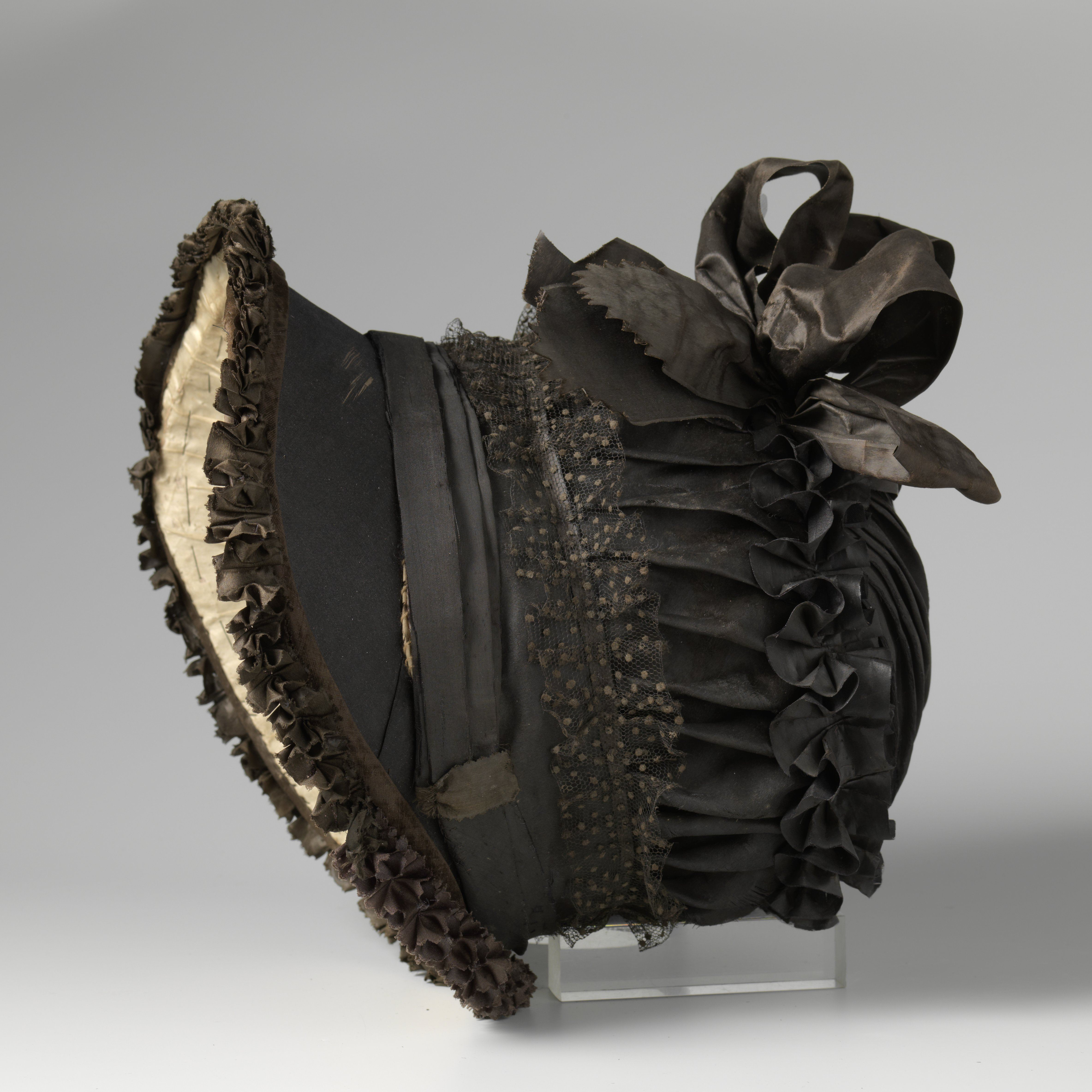
A black silk poke bonnet, trimmed with velvet and tulle circa 1815

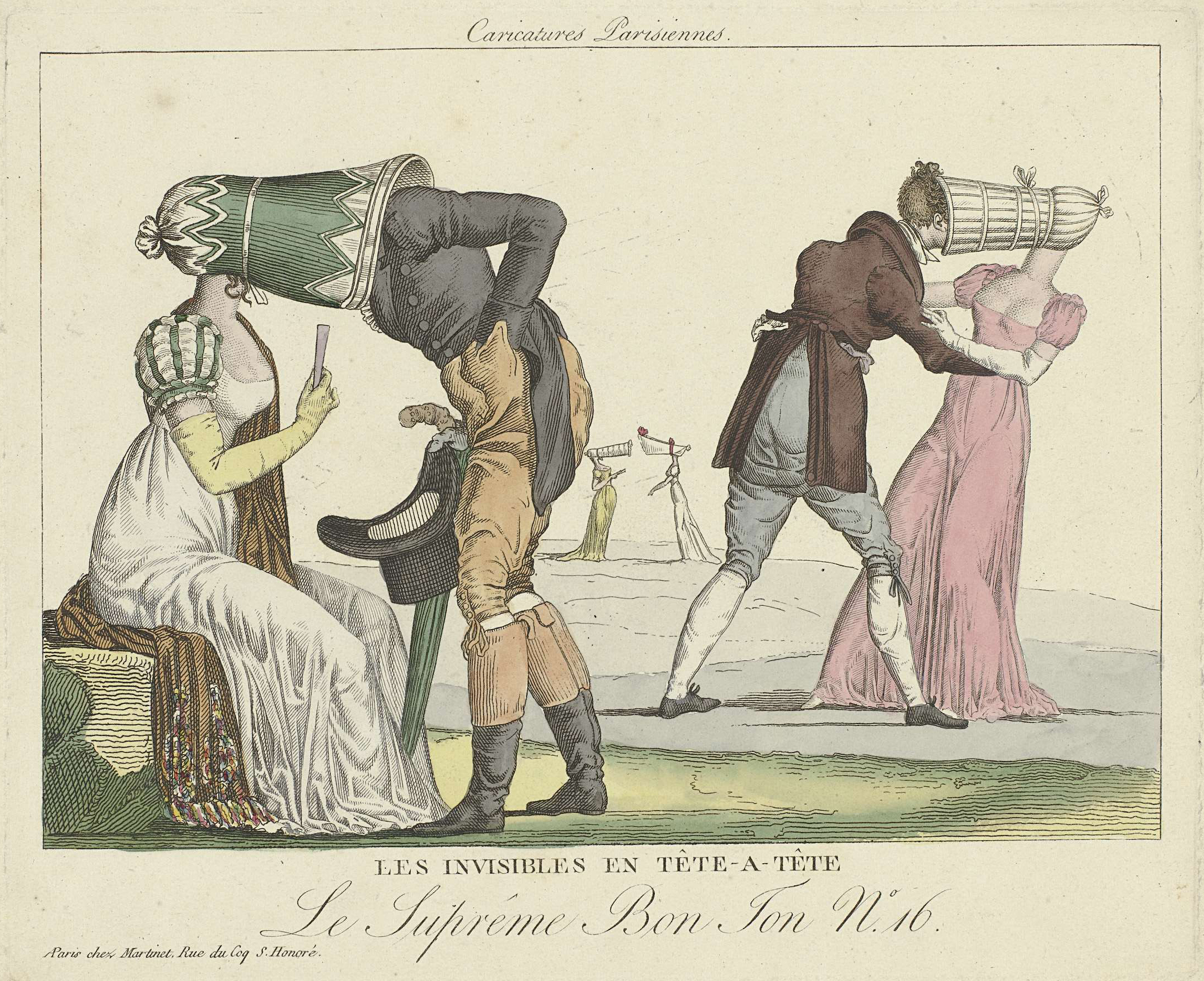
Late 1810s French cartoon lampooning the poke bonnet

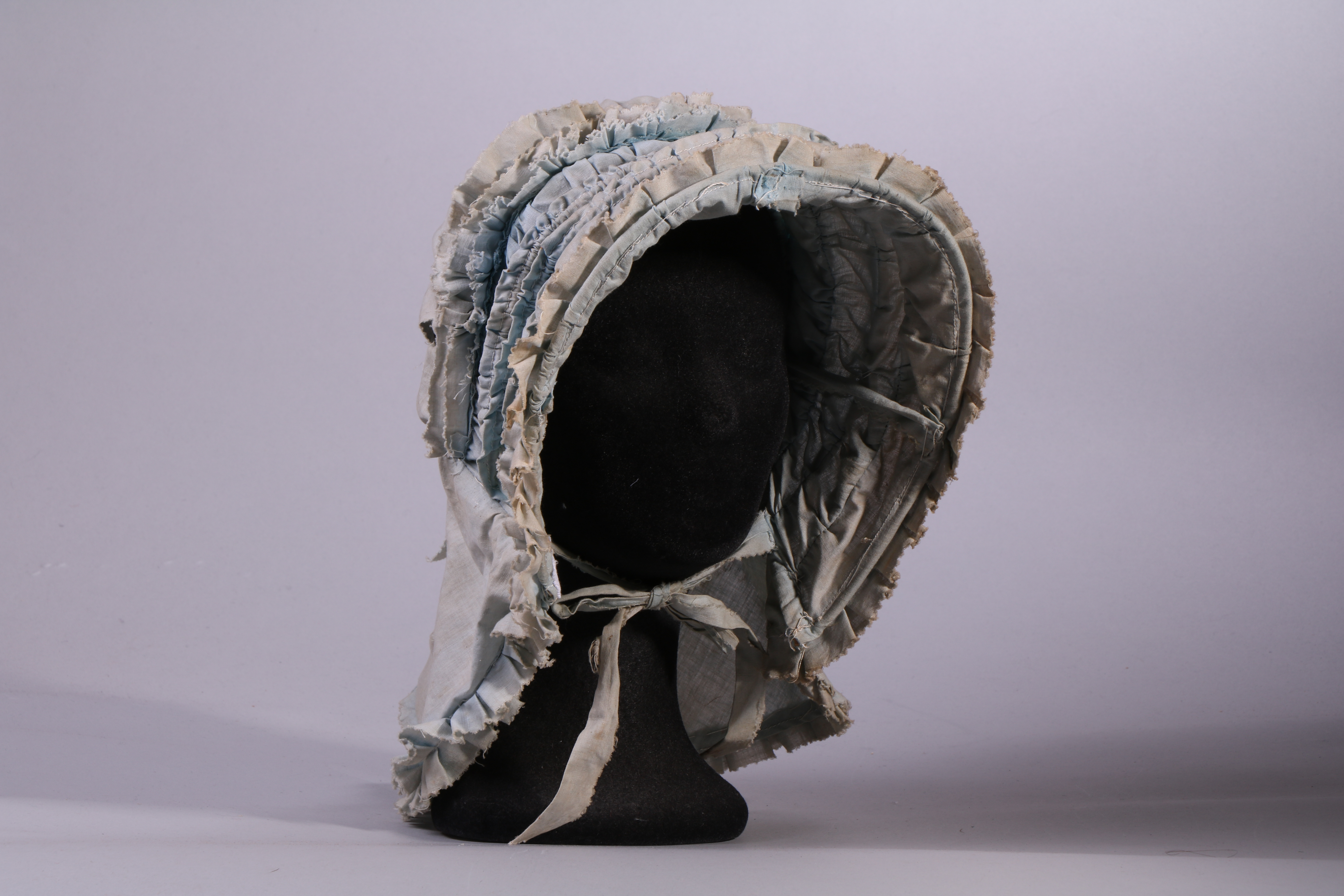
Poke bonnet in light blue cotton, MMH.1998.0354.00, Modemuseum Hasselt

A poke bonnet (sometimes also referred to as a Neapolitan bonnet or simply as a poke) is a women's bonnet, featuring a small crown and wide and rounded front brim. Typically this extends beyond the face. It has been suggested that the name came about because the bonnet was designed in such a way that the wearer's hair could be contained within the bonnet. Poke may also refer to the brim itself, which jutted out beyond the wearer's face.

== Characteristics ==
There were many variations of the style, which remained popular throughout much of the 19th century. The Metropolitan Museum of Art notes that the poke usually had a small crown combined with a large brim extending beyond the face, providing a large surface for decoration.

This prominent brim shaded the face and, over time increased in size so that the wearer's face could only be seen from the front. Typically, the bonnet would be secured by ribbons tied under the chin, which might also wrap around the bottom of the bonnet's crown, similar to a hatband. An 1830s version of the poke bonnet with ornate ribbon wrapping forms part of the Victoria and Albert Museum archive.

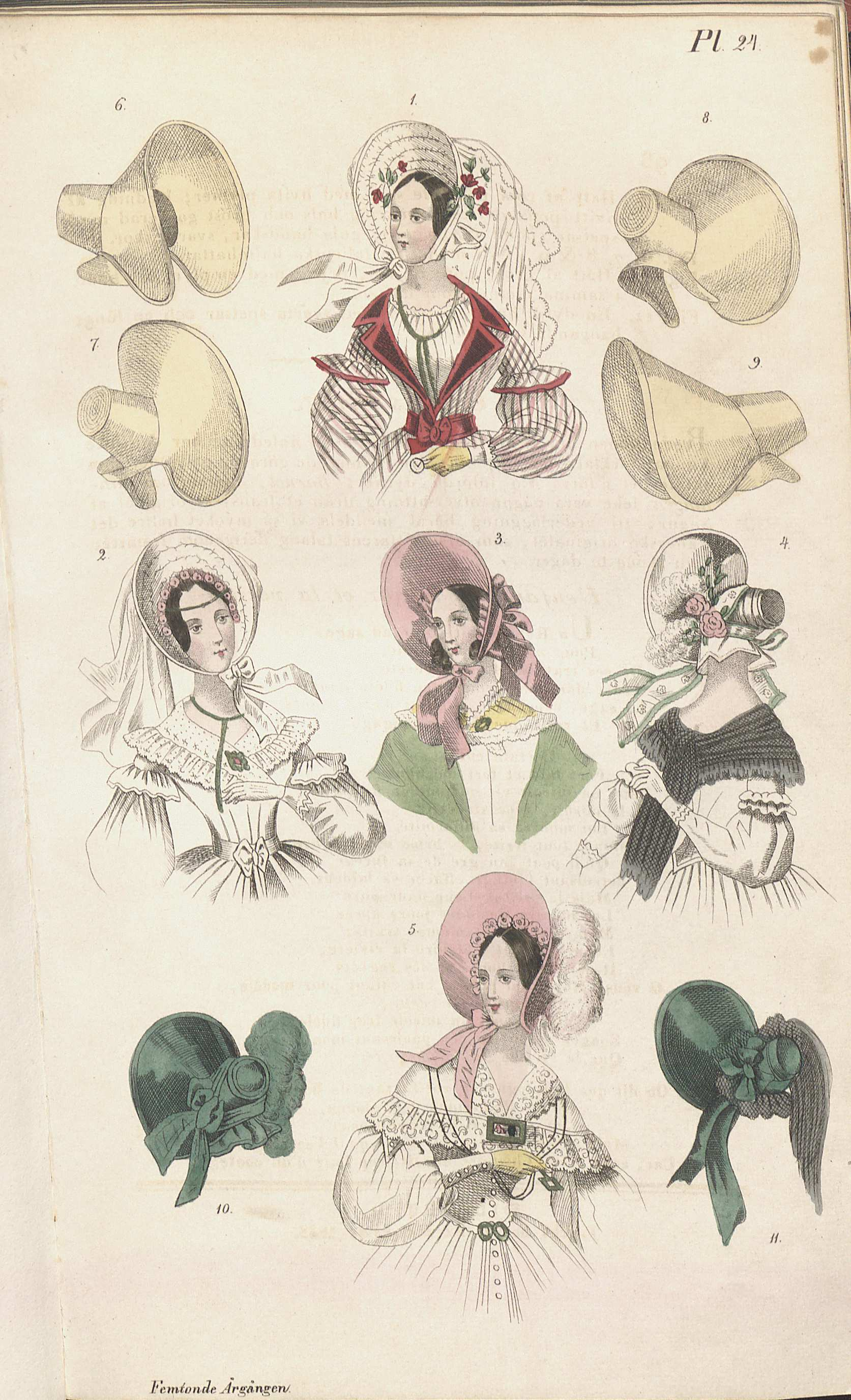
1838 Swedish fashion magazine showing wide brimmed versions of the poke

== History of the design ==
The poke bonnet came into fashion at the beginning of the 19th century. It is first mentioned in an 1807 fashion report in The Times; the report describes designs made of willow or velvet with long ribbons and full bows on one side of the hat.

By the 1830s, Englishwomen had adopted the poke bonnet. The new styles became widely popular and made the aristocracy less visibly distinct from the so-called respectable middle classes. The style is modest and was in line with English fashions after the ascension of Queen Victoria.

A poke bonnet features prominently in the illustrations of Beatrix Potter's Tale of Jemima Puddle-Duck. Another appears in the First World War-era music hall song "In your little poke bonnet and shawl".

== See also ==
- List of hat styles
- Salvation Army bonnet
- Coal scuttle bonnet
