= Cindy Woodsmall =

American author

Cindy Woodsmall is an American author of Amish romance fiction.

== Career ==
Woodsmall's debut novel was When the Heart Cries (WaterBrook, 2006). Two of her books, When the Morning Comes (WaterBrook, 2007) and When the Soul Mends (WaterBrook, 2008), were New York Times bestsellers.

In 2013, the Wall Street Journal reported that Woodsmall is one of the top three Amish fiction writers.

Publishers Weekly gave a starred review to her book The Englisch Daughter (WaterBrook, 2020).

== Personal life ==
Woodsmall homeschooled her children. She lives with her husband in the North Georgia Mountains.

== Selected works ==
- When the Heart Cries. WaterBrook, 2006.
- When the Morning Comes. WaterBrook, 2007.
- When the Soul Mends. WaterBrook, 2008.
- The Harvest of Grace. Waterbrook, 2011.
- A Season for Tending. WaterBrook, 2012.
- The Scent of Cherry Blossoms. WaterBrook, 2012.
- The Winnowing Season. WaterBrook, 2013.
- The Angel of Forest Hill: An Amish Christmas Romance. WaterBrook, 2016.
- As the Tide Comes in. WaterBrook, 2018.
- The Christmas Remedy: An Amish Christmas Romance. WaterBrook, 2018.
- A Christmas Haven. With Erin Woodsmall. WaterBrook, 2019.
- The Englisch Daughter. WaterBrook, 2020.
- Yesterday’s Gone. With Erin Woodsmall. Tyndale, 2022.
