= Shelley Shepard Gray =

American romance novelist

Shelley Shepard Gray is an American author of romance fiction novels.

== Career ==
Some of her books are Amish romance fiction. Her works have been New York Times and USA Today bestsellers.

Her books Christmas in Sugarcreek (Avon, 2011), All in (Blackstone, 2018), His Promise (Avon, 2018), and An Amish Homecoming received starred reviews from Publishers Weekly.

== Personal life ==
Gray is Lutheran. She lives in Colorado.

== Selected works ==
- Christmas in Sugarcreek. Avon, 2011.
- A Christmas for Katie. Avon, 2012.
- Missing. Avon, 2012.
- Thankful. Avon, 2014.
- The Promise of Palm Grove. Avon, 2014.
- An Amish Family Christmas. Avon, 2016.
- Her Secret: The Amish of Hart County. Avon, 2017.
- An Uncommon Protector. Zondervan, 2017.
- Love Held Captive. Zondervan, 2017.
- Her Fear. Avon, 2018.
- All in. Blackstone, 2018.
- Take a Chance. Blackstone, 2018.
- His Promise: An Amish Christmas in Hart County. Avon, 2018.
- The Protective One. Gallery, 2019.
- The Patient One. Gallery, 2019.
- Shall We Dance? Blackstone, 2019.
- Take the Lead. Blackstone, 2020.
- Save the Last Dance. Blackstone, 2020.
- The Trustworthy One. Gallery, 2020.
- A Perfect Amish Romance. Gallery, 2020.
- An Amish Surprise. Gallery, 2021.
- Happily Ever Amish. Kensington, 2022.
- Her Heart's Desire. Revell, 2022.
- Edgewater Road. Blackstone, 2022.

=== Collections with others ===
- An Amish Homecoming: Four Amish Stories. Zondervan, 2018.
- An Amish Second Christmas. Kensington, 2019.
- Amish Midwives: Three Stories. Zondervan, 2020.
- Christmas at the Amish Bakeshop. Kensington, 2021.
- An Amish Quilting Bee: Three Stories. Zondervan, 2021.
- An Amish Schoolroom: Three Stories. Zondervan, 2021.
