= Amish romance =

Literary subgenre of Christian fiction

Amish romance is a literary subgenre of Christian fiction featuring Amish characters, but written and read mostly by evangelical Christian women. An industry term for Amish romance novels is "bonnet rippers" because most feature a woman in a bonnet on the cover, and "bonnet ripper" is a play on the term "bodice ripper" from classic romance novels.

== History ==
The genre has proven lucrative for publishers, many of which are Christian publishers, such as Bethany House, Thomas Nelson, and Zondervan. The first commercially successful Amish romance novel, according to writer Valerie Weaver-Zercher, was Beverly Lewis' The Shunning, published in 1997 by Bethany House. In addition, over 150 Amish fiction e-books were self-published between 2010 and 2013. The three most successful authors of Amish romance—Beverly Lewis, Cindy Woodsmall, and Wanda Brunstetter—have sold over 24 million books.

While primarily written for and marketed to adult readers, some young adult Amish romance titles have been published as well. According to a September 2013 Library Journal survey, Amish fiction is the most commonly carried subgenre of Christian fiction in public libraries, although the survey did not distinguish between Amish romance and other Amish-themed literature.

== Themes ==
Most works of Amish romance have protagonists with socially conservative values, especially chastity, who engage in romance in ways which are socially and religiously acceptable in their communities. Similar works may also feature other religious minorities, such as Mennonites, Shakers, or Puritans. Unlike many mainstream romance novels, Amish romance novels do not rely on the portrayal of sex and most other forms of physical intimacy. Valerie Weaver-Zercher states, "Despite the suggestion by some that the appeal of Amish fiction must lie in the arousal of coverings coming off, or suspenders being suspended—hence the coy industry term 'bonnet rippers'—most Amish novels are as different from Fifty Shades of Grey as a cape dress is from a spiked collar."

== Literary criticism ==
Reactions to works of Amish romance among the Amish themselves range from baffled (by things like deadly buggy accident themes) to repulsed (by evangelical notions of personal relationships with Jesus Christ which are inconsistent with the Amish view of salvation).

== Notable authors of Amish romance fiction ==
- Jean Brunstetter
- Wanda E. Brunstetter
- Amy Clipston
- Tricia Goyer
- Shelley Shepard Gray
- Kelly Irvin
- Beverly Lewis
- Ruth Reid
- Beth Wiseman
- Cindy Woodsmall

== See also ==
- Mennonite literature
- Romance novel
