= Wanda E. Brunstetter =

American novelist

Wanda E. Brunstetter is a novelist in the Amish romance genre, with more than 10 million books sold. Her books have been on the New York Times Best Seller list. Brunstetter is based in Washington.

== Biography ==
Brunstetter grew up in Tacoma, Washington. Her parents disapproved of her wish to be an author when she grew up; her father called her "a dreamer." She was 60 years of age when her first book was published in 1997, and she would have to wait another three years before her second book was accepted by a publishing house.

Brunstetter worked as a typist for the government and met her husband through work while he was stationed at Fort Lewis. Brunstetter's husband, Richard, who grew up in a Mennonite church, was the catalyst for her interest in the Amish. Brunstetter has always tried to portray the Amish culture accurately and uses her personal connection to the Mennonite community for research for her books. She and her husband have two children.

In 1980, her mother asked her to take a correspondence course on writing and afterwards, Brunstetter began to sell work to children's magazines and religious publications.

== Work ==
Library Journal writes that Brunstetter has a "trademark gift of storytelling." Her dialogue includes phrases from the Dietsch language.

In addition to her adult Amish fiction, she also writes for middle-grade readers. She has published cook-books about Amish cooking which include facts about the Amish.

== Organizations and affiliations ==
- Romance Writers of America
- American Christian Fiction Writers
- Northwest Christian Writers Association

== Awards ==
- Retailers Choice Award (2006) – Won for The Storekeeper’s Daughter
- Retailers Choice Award (2011) – Won for Lydia’s Charm
- Author of the Year for Family Fiction magazine (2011)
- Single Titles Reviewers’ Choice Award (2013) – Won for The Tattered Quilt
- Career Achievement Award for Inspirational Novels for RT Book Reviews (2013)
- Single Titles Reviewers’ Choice Award (2014) – Won for Woman of Courage

== Bibliography ==
=== Amish series ===
==== Brides of Lancaster County ====
1. A Merry Heart (1997)
2. Looking for a Miracle (2001)
3. Plain and Fancy (2002)
4. The Hope Chest (2002)
- Brides of Lancaster County (2012) (4-in-1 collection of entire series)

==== Brides of Webster County ====
1. Going Home (2004)
2. On Her Own (2007)
3. Dear to Me (2005)
4. Allison's Journey (2005)
- The Brides of Webster County (2008) (4-in-1 collection of entire series)

==== Daughters of Lancaster County ====
1. The Storekeeper's Daughter (2005)
2. The Quilter's Daughter (2006)
3. The Bishop's Daughter (2006)
- The Daughters of Lancaster County (2011) (3-in-1 collection of entire series)

==== Sisters of Holmes County ====
1. A Sister's Secret (2007)
2. A Sister's Test (2007)
3. A Sister's Hope (2008)
- Sisters of Holmes County (2009) (3-in-1 collection of entire series)

==== Indiana Cousins ====
1. A Cousin's Promise (2009)
2. A Cousin's Prayer (2009)
3. A Cousin's Challenge (2010)
- Indiana Cousins (2011) (3-in-1 collection of entire series)

==== Kentucky Brothers ====
1. The Journey (2011)
2. The Healing (2011)
3. The Struggle (2011)
- The Kentucky Brothers Trilogy (2013) (3-in-1 collection of entire series)

==== The Half-Stitched Amish Quilting Club ====
1. The Half-Stitched Amish Quilting Club (2012)
2. The Tattered Quilt (2013)
3. The Healing Quilt (2013)
- The Half-Stitched Amish Quilting Club Trilogy (2015) (3-in-1 collection of entire series)

==== Love Finds a Way ====
1. Blueberry Surprise (2012)
2. Grandma's Doll (2012)
3. Matchmaker 911 (2012)

==== Discovery ====
1. Goodbye to Yesterday (2013)
2. The Silence of Winter (2013)
3. The Hope of Spring (2013)
4. The Pieces of Summer (2013)
5. A Revelation in Autumn (2013)
6. A Vow for Always (2013)
- The Discovery Saga Collection (2014) (6-in-1 collection of entire series)

==== Prairie State Friends ====
1. The Decision (2015)
2. The Gift (2015)
3. The Revelation (2016)

==== Lopsided Christmas Cake ====
(with Jean Brunstetter)

1. The Lopsided Christmas Cake (2015)

==== Amish Millionaire ====
(with Jean Brunstetter)

1. The English Son (2016)
2. The Stubborn Father (2016)
3. The Betrayed Fiancee (2016)
4. The Missing Will (2016)
5. The Divided Family (2016)
6. The Selfless Act (2016)

==== Amish Cooking Class ====
1. The Seekers (2017)
2. The Blessing (2017)
3. The Celebration (2018)

=== Historical series ===
==== Brides of Lehigh Canal ====
1. Kelly's Chance (2004)
2. Betsy's Return (2007)
3. Sarah's Choice (2010)
- Brides of Lehigh Canal (2012) (3-in-1 collection of entire series)

=== Standalone novels ===
- Lydia's Charm (2010)
- White Christmas Pie (2008)
- Women of Courage (2014)
- The Hawaiian Quilt (2016) (with Jean Brunstetter)

=== Novella collections ===
- Love Finds a Home (2011)
- Love Finds a Way (2012)
- Log Cabin Christmas (2013)
- Twice Loved (2013)
- The Westward Christmas Brides (2014)
- Sweet Surprise (2014)
- A Time to Laugh (2014)
- The Christmas Secret (2016)

=== Children's books ===
==== Rachel Yoder ====
1. School's Out (2007)
2. Back to School (2007)
3. Out of Control (2008)
4. New Beginnings (2008)
5. A Happy Heart (2008)
6. Just Plain Foolishness (2008)
7. Jumping to Conclusions (2009)
8. Growing Up (2009)
- Look Out, Lancaster County (2011) (4-in-1 collection of books 1–4 in series)
- Growing Up in Lancaster County (2011) (4-in-1 collection of books 5–8 in series)

==== Double Trouble ====
1. What a Pair! (2012)
2. Bumpy Ride Ahead (2012)
3. Bubble Troubles (2013)
4. Green Fever (2013)
5. Humble Pie (2014)

==== Standalone novels ====
- The Wisdom of Solomon Lapp (2009)

=== Upcoming ===
- The Farmers' Market Mishap (June 2017) (with Jean Brunstetter) (#2 in Lopsided Christmas Cake series)
- The Blessing (August 2017) (#2 in Amish Cooking Class series)
- The Beloved Christmas Quilt (September 2017) (with Jean Brunstetter and Richelle Brunstetter) (novella collection of 3 stories)
- Amish Millionaire (November 2017) (with Jean Brunstetter) (6-in-1 collection of entire Amish Millionaire series)
