= Jean Brunstetter =

American author

Jean Brunstetter is an author of Christian fiction.

== Biography ==
Brunstetter writes Amish romance fiction with her mother-in-law, Wanda E. Brunstetter. Their book The Selfless Act (Shiloh Run Press, 2016) received a starred review from Library Journal. Brunstetter is a Publishers Weekly-bestselling author.

== Selected works ==
=== With Wanda E. Brunstetter ===
- The Selfless Act. Shiloh Run Press, 2016.
- The English Son. Shiloh Run Press, 2016.
- The Hawaiian Discovery. Barbour, 2018.
