= Kelly Irvin =

American author

Kelly Irvin is a writer of Christian fiction.

== Biography ==
Irvin graduated from the University of Kansas School of Journalism.

Irvin writes suspense and Amish romance novels. Her novel The Beekeeper's Son (Zondervan, 2014) received a starred review from Publishers Weekly.

== Selected works ==
- A Deadly Wilderness: The Ties That Kill. Five Star, 2009.
- No Child of Mine. Five Star, 2011.
- A Heart Made New. Harvest House, 2012.
- Love's Journey Home. Harvest House, 2013.
- The Beekeeper's Son. Zondervan, 2014.
- The Bishop's Son. Zondervan, 2015.
- Beneath the Summer Sun. Zondervan, 2017.
- Upon a Spring Breeze. Zondervan, 2017.
- Through the Autumn Air. Zondervan, 2018.
- Tell Her No Lies. Thomas Nelson, 2018.
- Mountains of Grace. Zondervan, 2019.
- Her Every Move. Thomas Nelson, 2020.
- Closer Than She Knows. Thomas Nelson, 2020.
- Trust Me. Thomas Nelson, 2021.
- The Warmth of Sunshine. Zondervan, 2022.

=== With others ===
- An Amish Christmas Bakery. Zondervan, 2019.
- An Amish Picnic. Zondervan, 2020.
- An Amish Christmas Love: Four Novellas. Thomas Nelson, 2017.
- An Amish Christmas Gift: Three Novellas. Thomas Nelson, 2015.
- An Amish Christmas Wedding: Four Stories. Zondervan, 2020.
