= Amy Clipston =

American romance fiction writer

- Education: Virginia Wesleyan University
- Occupation: Writer
- Writing career
- Genres: Amish romance; young adult fiction
- Website: amyclipston.com

Amy Clipston is an American romance fiction writer.

== Biography ==
Her primary genre is Amish romance fiction. Clipston has also written young adult fiction.

Clipston attended Virginia Wesleyan College; she studied communications. She works full-time for a local government organization.

She contributed to the collection An Amish Homecoming: Four Amish Stories (Zondervan, 2018). It received a starred review from Publishers Weekly.

== Selected works ==
- A Place of Peace. Zondervan, 2010.
- Roadside Assistance. Zondervan, 2011.
- The Forgotten Recipe. Zondervan, 2015.
- The Beloved Hope Chest. Zondervan, 2017.
- A Seat by the Hearth. Zondervan, 2018.

=== With others ===
- An Amish Christmas Gift: Three Novellas. Thomas Nelson, 2015.
- An Amish Harvest: Four Novellas. Thomas Nelson, 2016.
- An Amish Christmas Love. Thomas Nelson, 2017.
- An Amish Home. Thomas Nelson, 2017.
- An Amish Homecoming. Zondervan, 2018.
