= Tricia Goyer =

American Christian author

Tricia Goyer is an American author of Christian fiction and a podcaster.

== Biography ==
Tricia Goyer has written more than 70 books. She is known for her Amish romance novels. She co-wrote a non-fiction book, Every Little Win: How Celebrating Small Victories Can Lead to Big Joy (Thomas Nelson, 2021) with Brooke and Todd Tilghman.

Goyer has 10 children, three of whom are her biological children. She homeschooled her children. She advocates for foster care and adoption.

== Selected works ==
- The Swiss Courier. Revell, 2009.
- Remembering You. Guideposts, 2011.
- The Promise Box. Zondervan, 2013.

=== With others ===
- An Amish Christmas Gift: Three Novellas. Thomas Nelson, 2015.
- Tilghman, Todd and Brooke. Every Little Win: How Celebrating Small Victories Can Lead to Big Joy. Thomas Nelson, 2021.
