= Salvation Army bonnet =

Former headcovering worn by female members of the Salvation Army

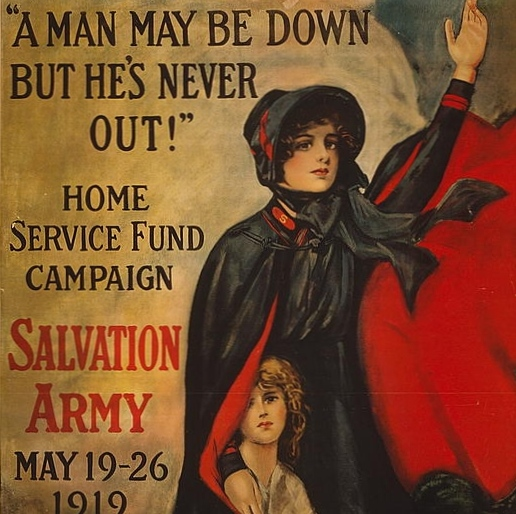
World War I poster showing the design of the Salvation Army bonnet

The Salvation Army bonnet was the headcovering worn by female members of the Salvation Army. It was introduced in 1880 in the UK and was worn as headgear by most female officers and uniformed soldiers in western countries. It began to be phased out from the late 1960s.

== Origins of the design ==
The Salvation Army bonnet was first seen on Wednesday 16 June 1880 at William and Catherine Booth's silver wedding anniversary celebration in Whitechapel, London. Its design was due, in part, to the fact that one of the cadets training at the Salvation Army's Hackney college in 1880 was a milliner from Barnsley called Annie E. Lockwood. She trimmed a bonnet chosen from straw designs supplied by local companies – initially the ribbon chosen was blue, but later this would become black.

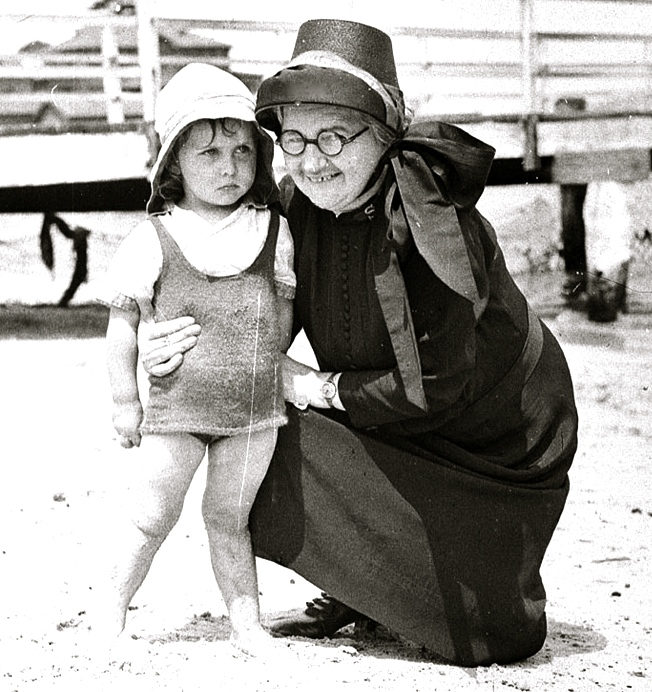
1936 Salvation Army bonnet at a picnic in Australia

In design, it was similar to the poke bonnet that had been popularly worn by women earlier in the century. In 1881, the Salvation Army published some general rules prohibiting alteration of the distinctive bonnet. This was among the more identifiable parts of the uniform as the guidance at this time was simply to wear modest clothing suitable for a military organisation.

The design also became popularly known as the 'hallelujah bonnet' and came to symbolise the Army's work. The bonnet's purpose was not only to identify the wearer, but to protect the head from cold and – in the early days – objects hurled at the head by people unsympathetic to the Army's work. An early example of the design is part of the Museum of London collection.

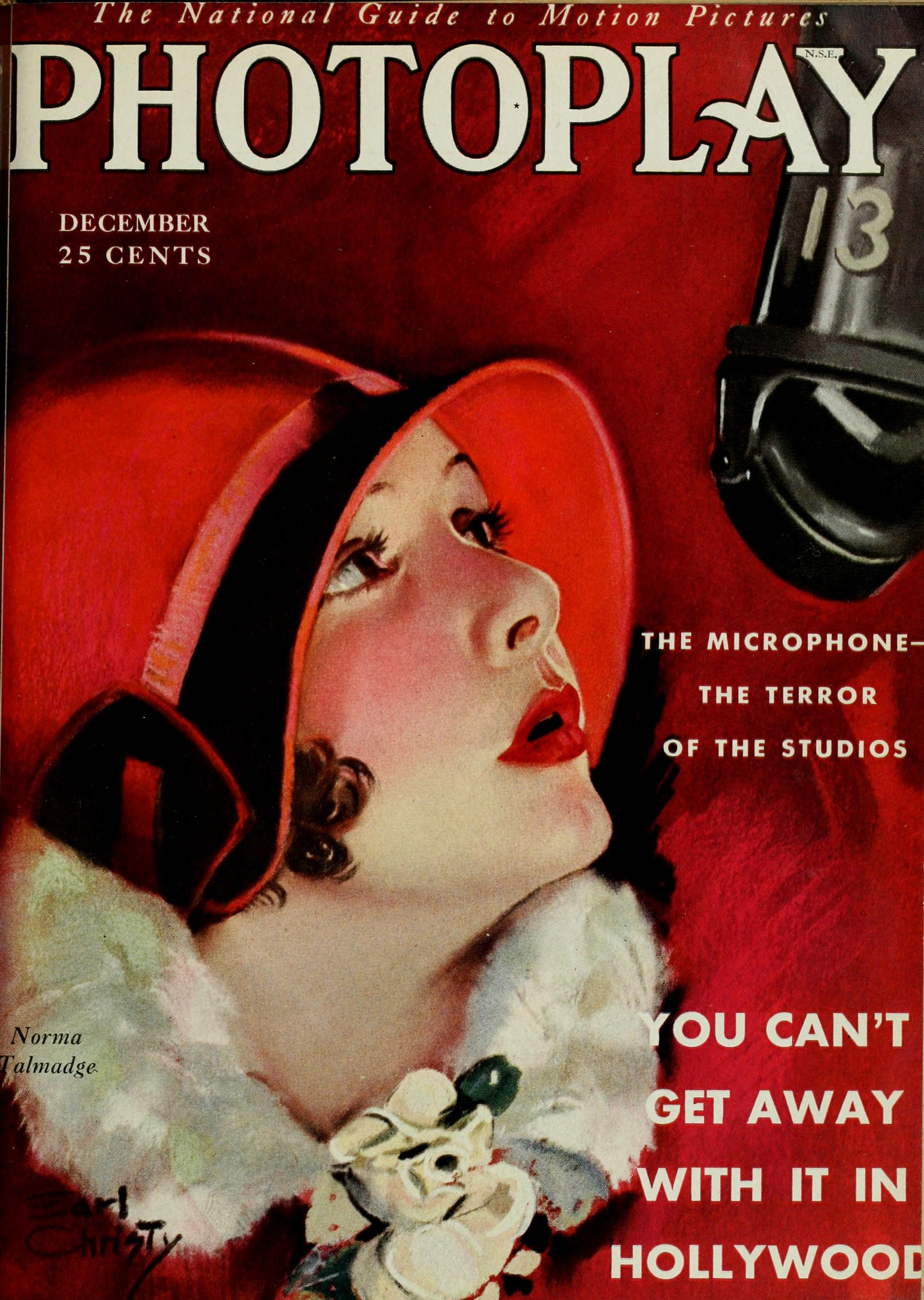
A poke bonnet-style adaptation of the cloche worn by Norma Talmadge in 1929

=== 1920s and 1930s fashion adaptations ===
In the 1920s and '30s, a hat sometimes referred to as the Salvation Army bonnet became a fashion accessory. This had a similar basic silhouette to the original poke bonnet design but could be made in other hat materials and colours.

A Guardian fashion feature of 1926 on the latest Paris hat fashions noted the parallels between new derivations of the cloche and Victorian bonnets: "Paris is growing tired of wearing saucepans, paper-bags and sugar-loaves on its head. It remembers that it once had a cap of liberty, which was very becoming if a little drastic, and that Salvation Army pokes were worn as well during the Directoire period...the hat with the rather high crown and the brim varying from nothing to the Salvation Army shape will be far more in favour". Another article in The Guardian later that year commented on the prevalence of Salvation Army-style straw hats, minus the strings: "In straws – and there are a good many of these – the brim forms a huge peak in front, and from this it is a short step to a sort of Salvation Army hat – for there are no strings. The hair shows not at all at the back of the neck. A century ago this effect was achieved by doing the hair high. Today the hair is cut off, but the effect is the same".

The Times reported a new modified poke bonnet style in pale pink created by the studio of Caroline Reboux for spring 1938. This was part of a Victorian and Edwardian revival in fashion that the newspaper described as dominating fashion during winter 1938.

== See also ==
- List of hat styles
- Bonnet
- Poke bonnet
- Cloche hat
