= Shower cap =

Waterproof cap worn to keep the hair dry while bathing

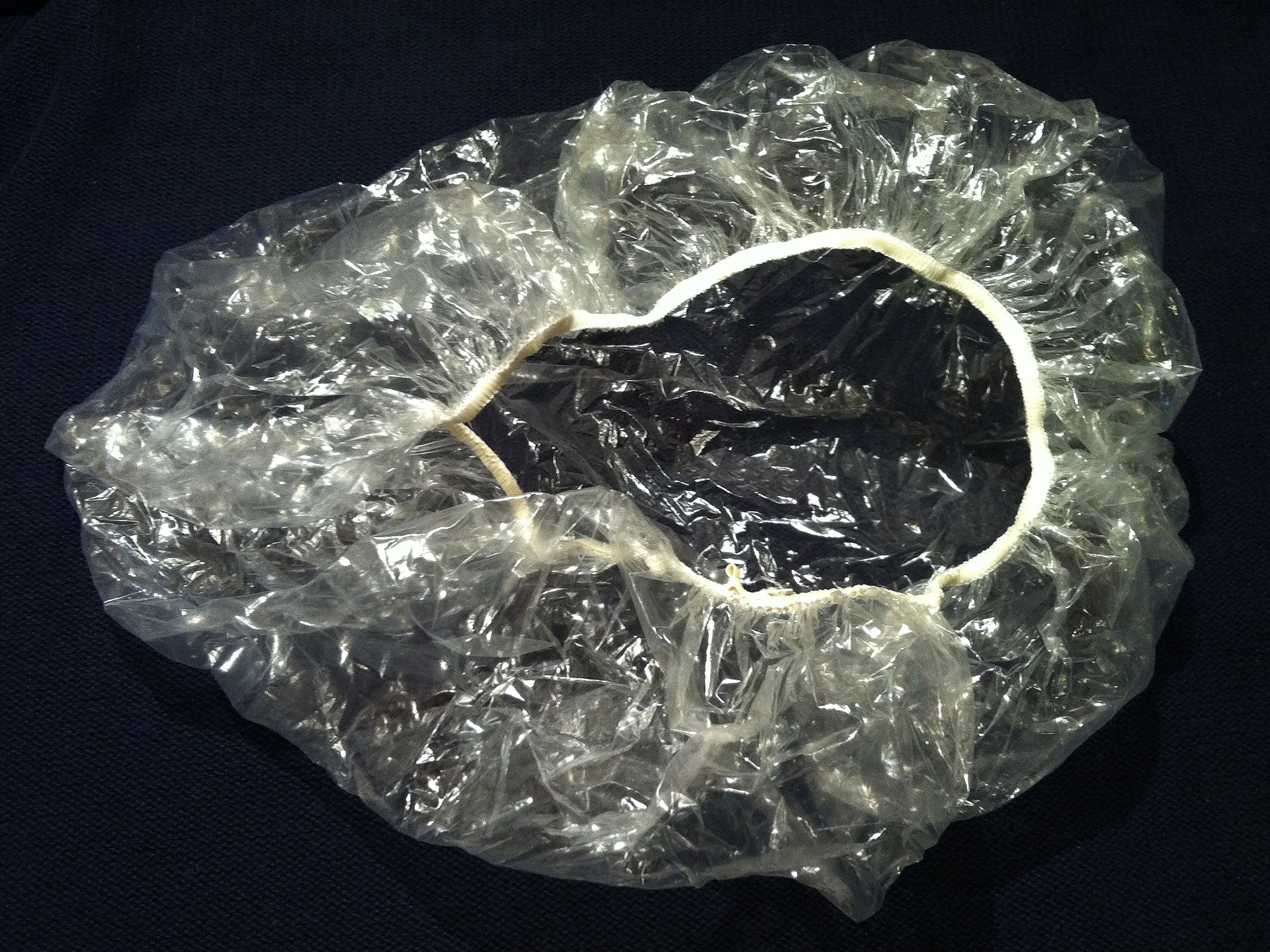
A disposable shower cap

A shower cap (also known as a bath cap) is a hat worn while showering or bathing to protect hair from becoming wet. Alternatively, shower caps for children can be crowns with wide brims that prevent water and shampoo from getting in the eyes while allowing the hair to be washed.

Many designs are produced by joining two layers of fabric together in order to make the shower cap not only waterproof but decorative. However, simpler designs are made from one layer of a waterproof material. Designs invariably contain an elastic edging to keep them in place. Shower caps are used in hair mask treatments or hair dyes. They trap in the heat so that the treatment or color sets in. Plastic bags are often used as shower caps. They are important beauty tools in spas. Shower caps are also worn when receiving a facial mask in a spa.
