= Ruth Reid (author) =

American author

Ruth Reid is an American author of romance fiction, known for her works based in the Amish community.

== Early life and education ==
Ruth Reid grew up in Michigan and attended Ferris State University School of Pharmacy.

== Career ==
Reid is a Publishers Weekly-bestselling author. She writes Amish romance fiction.

Her novel Abiding Mercy (Thomas Nelson, 2017) received a starred review from Library Journal.

== Personal life ==
As of October 2018 Reid was living in Florida.

== Selected works ==
- The Promise of an Angel. Thomas Nelson, 2011.
- A Woodland Miracle. Thomas Nelson, 2017.
- Abiding Mercy. Thomas Nelson, 2017.
- Steadfast Mary. Thomas Nelson, 2020.

=== With others ===
- An Amish Christmas Gift: Three Novellas. Thomas Nelson, 2015.
- An Amish Christmas Love: Four Novellas. Thomas Nelson, 2017.
- An Amish Home. Thomas Nelson, 2017.
