= Reboux =

Reboux is a surname. Notable people with the surname include:

- Caroline Reboux (c.1840–1927), French milliner and fashion designer
- Paul Reboux (1877–1963), French writer, humorist, literary critic and painter
