= Rose Valois =

Rose Valois was the name of a millinery establishment in Paris founded in 1927 by Madame Fernand Cleuet, Vera Leigh, and one other. It closed in 1970. During its time, it was considered one of the leading milliners of the 1930s, 40s and 50s.

The founders of Rose Valois had all worked with Caroline Reboux, leaving in 1927 to found their own salon. Rose was Mme Cleuet's first name, and Valois was a construct made up from the initials of Vera Leigh and the other (as yet unidentified) woman. Leigh left Rose Valois in 1940, which remained in business through the occupation of France by enemy German forces during World War II, despite Leigh's later involvement as a member of the French Resistance, leading to her arrest and execution by the Germans in 1944. Rose's husband, Fernand Cleuet (d. June 1961) was chief executive officer of the establishment.

Simone Mirman, who later found fame as one of London's foremost milliners in the 1940s-1960s, served her apprenticeship with Valois.
