= Madame Laferrière =

French fashion designer milliner

Madame Laferrière (19th-century) was a French fashion designer milliner. She belonged to the elite of the French fashion industry during the Second Empire.

She was one of the favorite designers of the empress of France, Eugénie de Montijo. The empress, who was a major fashion icon of the time, had favorite designers who attended different parts of her wardrobe. In the 1860s, the evening gowns of the empress was designed by Charles Frederick Worth, the morning dresses was made by Madame Laferrière, and the outerwear by Mademoiselle Félicie; Félix Escalier was the hairdresser of the empress, while her the task to design her hats was shared between Madame Virot and Madame Lebel.

The fashions of the empress were copied all over the world, and benefitted the careers of her favorite designers, all of whom belonged to the elite designers of the French fashion industry at the time.
