= Draped turban =

Type of headwear

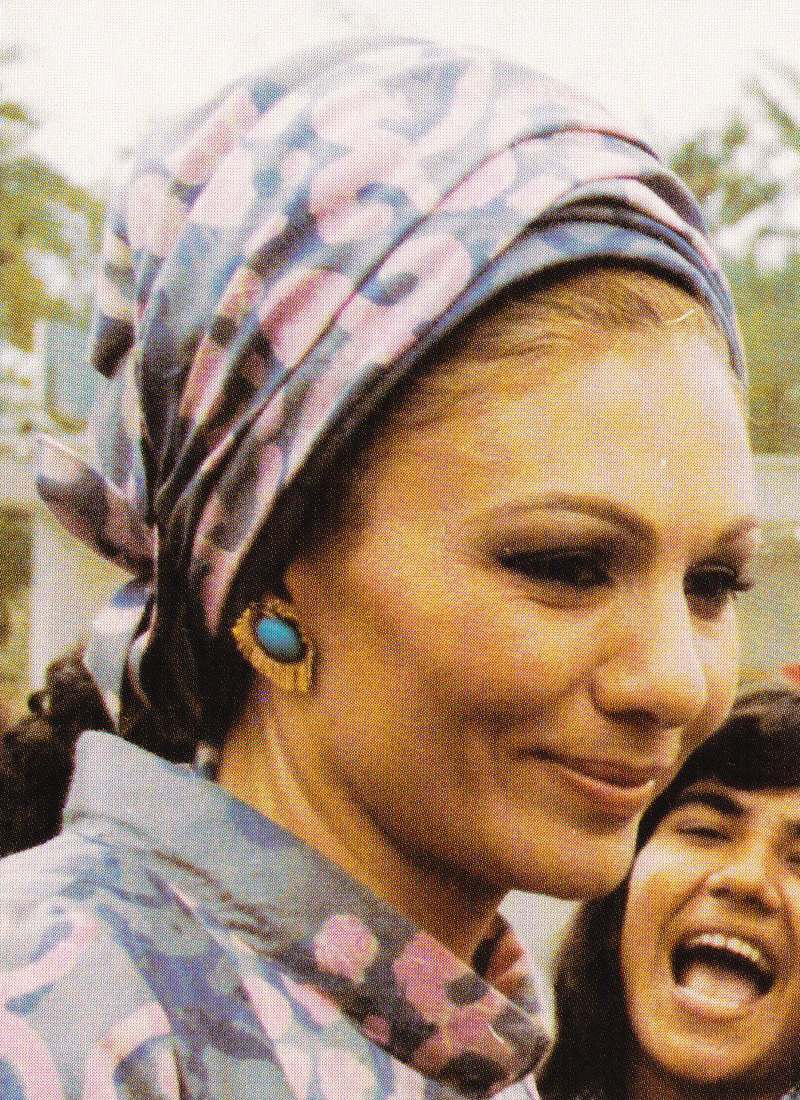
Farah Pahlavi wearing a printed silk draped turban in 1975

A draped turban or turban hat is a millinery design in which fabric is draped to create headwear closely moulded to the head. Sometimes it may be stiffened or padded, although simpler versions may just comprise wound fabric that is knotted or stitched. It may include a peak, feather or other details to add height. It generally covers most or all of the hair.

In fashion, the draped turban has a history dating back to at least the late 18th century, and had revivals in most decades of the 20th century. Notably, it rose to popularity in the 1910s as a symbol of eastern glamour, while in the 1940s it was worn by everyone from Hollywood stars to land girls. In the 1960s and 1970s, it was revived by designers including Biba in the UK and Halston in the US – and worn by royalty and hippies alike. More recently, new designs began appearing on the fashion catwalks and in the second Sex and the City movie.

== 18th and 19th centuries ==
While earlier portraits show examples of the turban in women's dress – notably Vermeer's 1665 portrait Girl with a Pearl Earring – the draped turban is first recorded as a widespread fashion in Britain in the late 18th century, rising to even greater popularity during the Regency era; this was a fashion said to be inspired by increased trade with India for the import of cottons. The fashion may also have been partly inspired by growing interest in, and knowledge of, the Ottoman Empire and Turkey. The writings of Lady Mary Wortley Montagu on Turkey are also said to have been an influence. There are several portraits of her in turban style headgear and the turban was also sometimes known as the turk or chiffonet.

The style of turban was initially simple, in keeping with the drape of gowns of the time, but as its popularity developed it tended to follow the fashion in hair and became progressively larger as hairstyles became more elaborate. Turbans might be lavishly decorated with plumes for balls and functions, but also for daywear – as satirised in a 1796 James Gillray cartoon, High Change in Bond Street. The fashion remained during the early decades of the 19th century, with examples of Paris and London fashions from the 1830s showing ornate turban headdresses topped with tall plumes. The "a la turque" style of headdress, influenced and inspired by the popular interest in Eastern cultures, was popular in the 1820s.

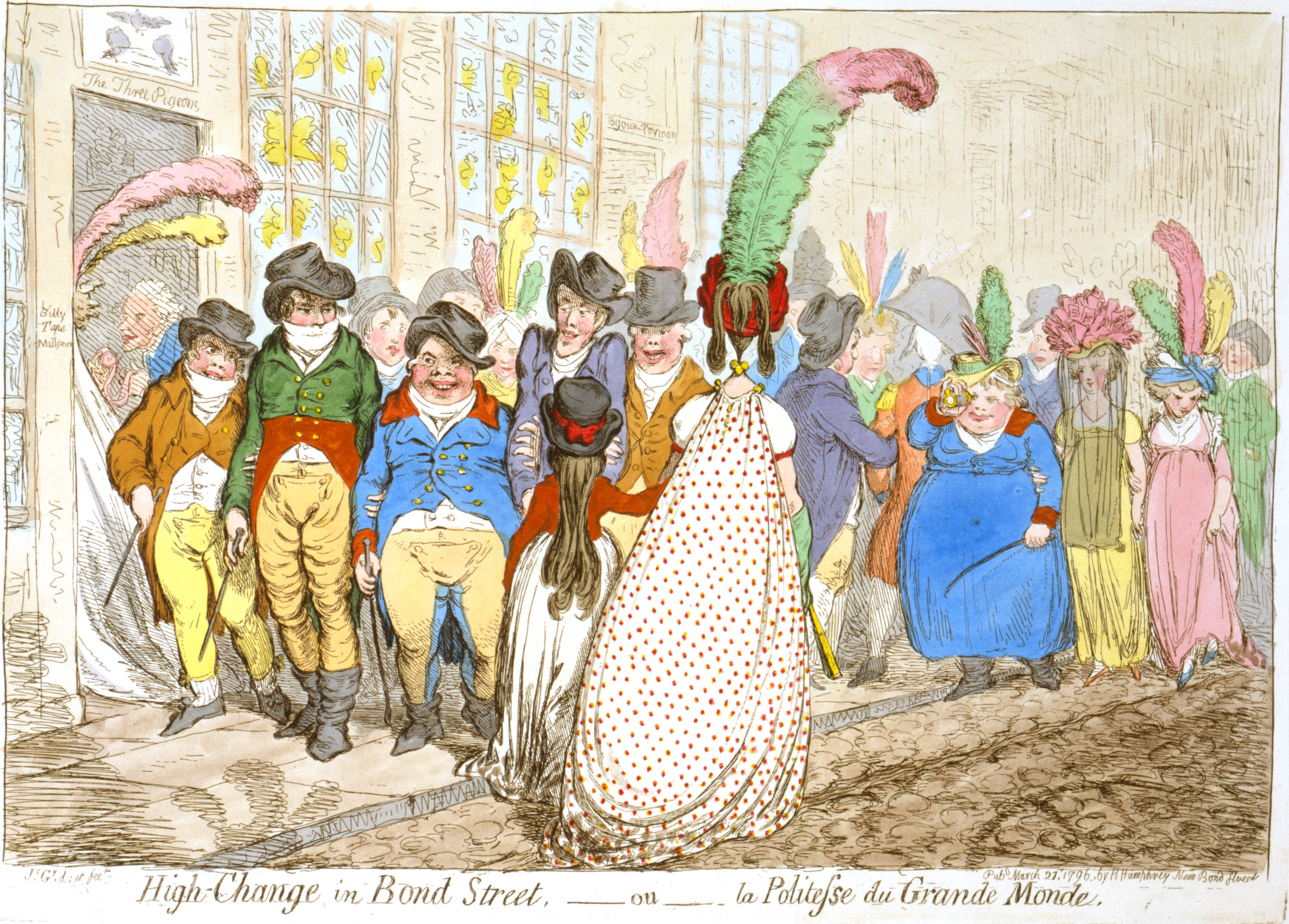
High Change in Bond-Street, a Regency cartoon by James Gillray

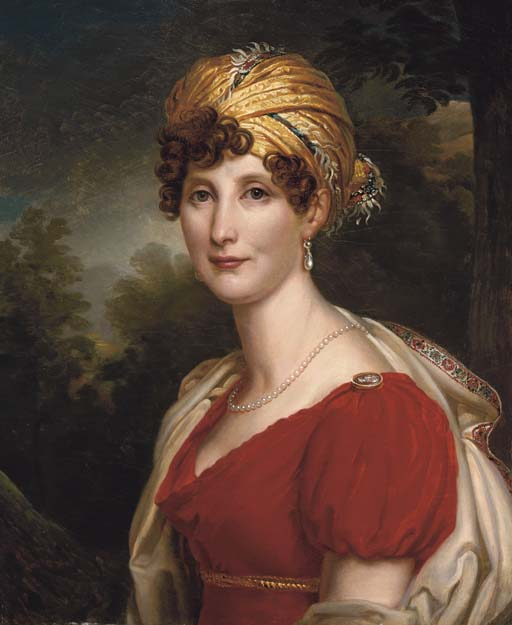
Portrait of Eléonore de Montmorency wearing a turban, c. 1810

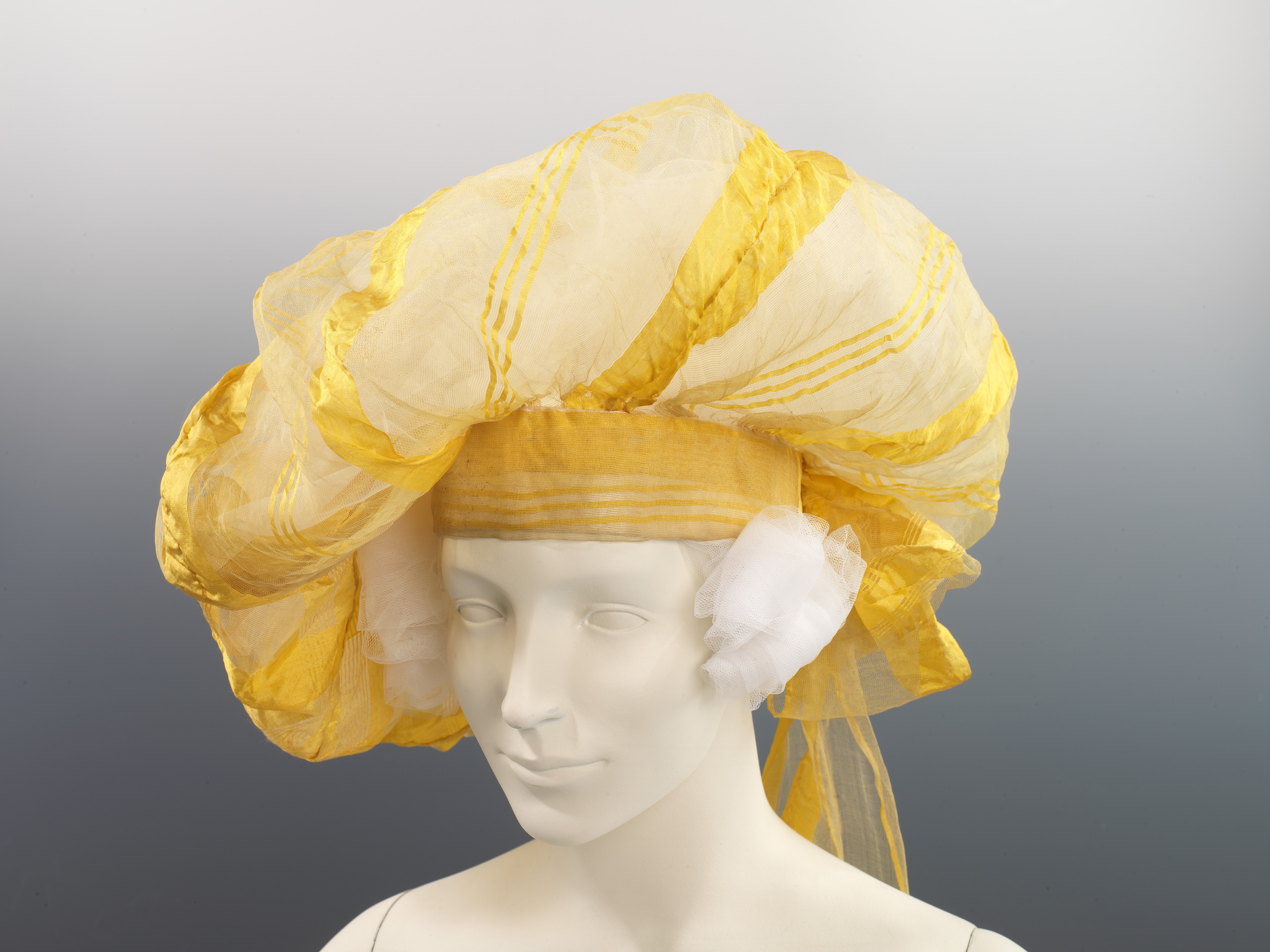
The "a la turque" style of headdress, influenced and inspired by the popular interest in Eastern cultures, was popular in the 1820s.

== Early 20th century ==
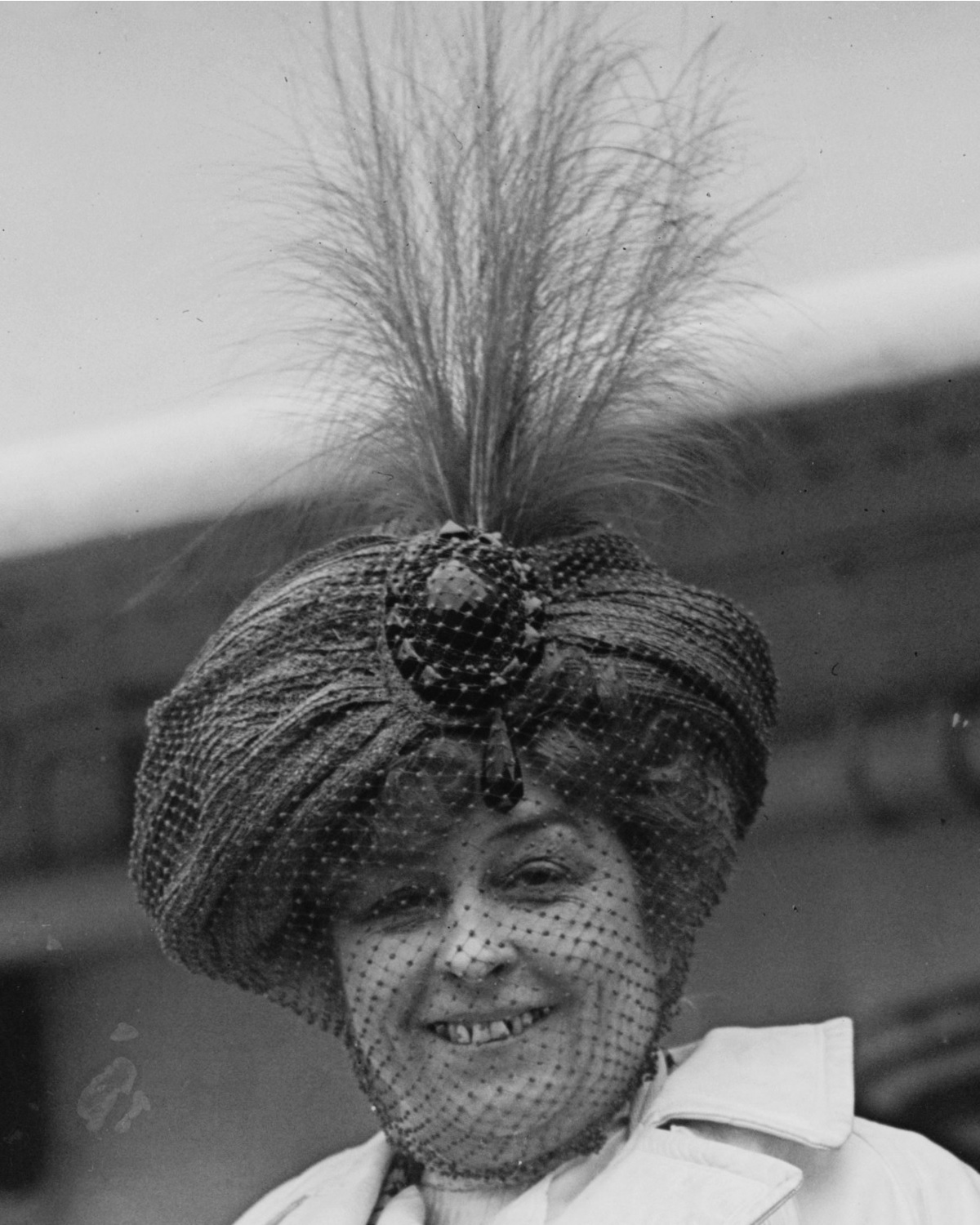
Amelia Bingham in an ornate turban hat, 1910

Paul Poiret, the so-called 'Sultan de la mode', included the turban in his revival of 'oriental' styles in the early 1910s. As part of his research Poiret visited the Victoria and Albert Museum in order to study its collection of antique Indian turbans, declaring "I admired unwaveringly the diversity of their so logical and so elegant forms."

Turbans continued gaining in popularity from the early 1920s. Some of this may have been due to the increasing availability of the motor car, since the close-fitting design helped to protect the hair and head from the elements. A 1923 fashion report in The Times described the arrival of neat leather caps and new turban designs, adding that the turban is: "seen in many embroidered and swathed varieties, some of which are built on 'beret', others on Russian designs, turning right off the face, and some on close-fitting lines." Its popularity survived the decade, a 1929 newspaper report on the autumn Paris fashions noted that the cloche hat had given way to the Basque beret and the turban trimmed with ribbon bows. Designs were typically made of silk, felt or velvet and could be finished with additional details such as feathers or brooches.

In 1937, the turban hat was tipped as one of the "smartest models in the new millinery", with new designs being shown in heavier fabrics such as velvet. In London, The Times reported on a Paris ensemble of astrakhan fur coat with velvet dress and draped velvet turban to match. The following year, it featured a high draped turban with attached veil as being among the latest bridal fashions.

== Wartime and post-war popularity ==
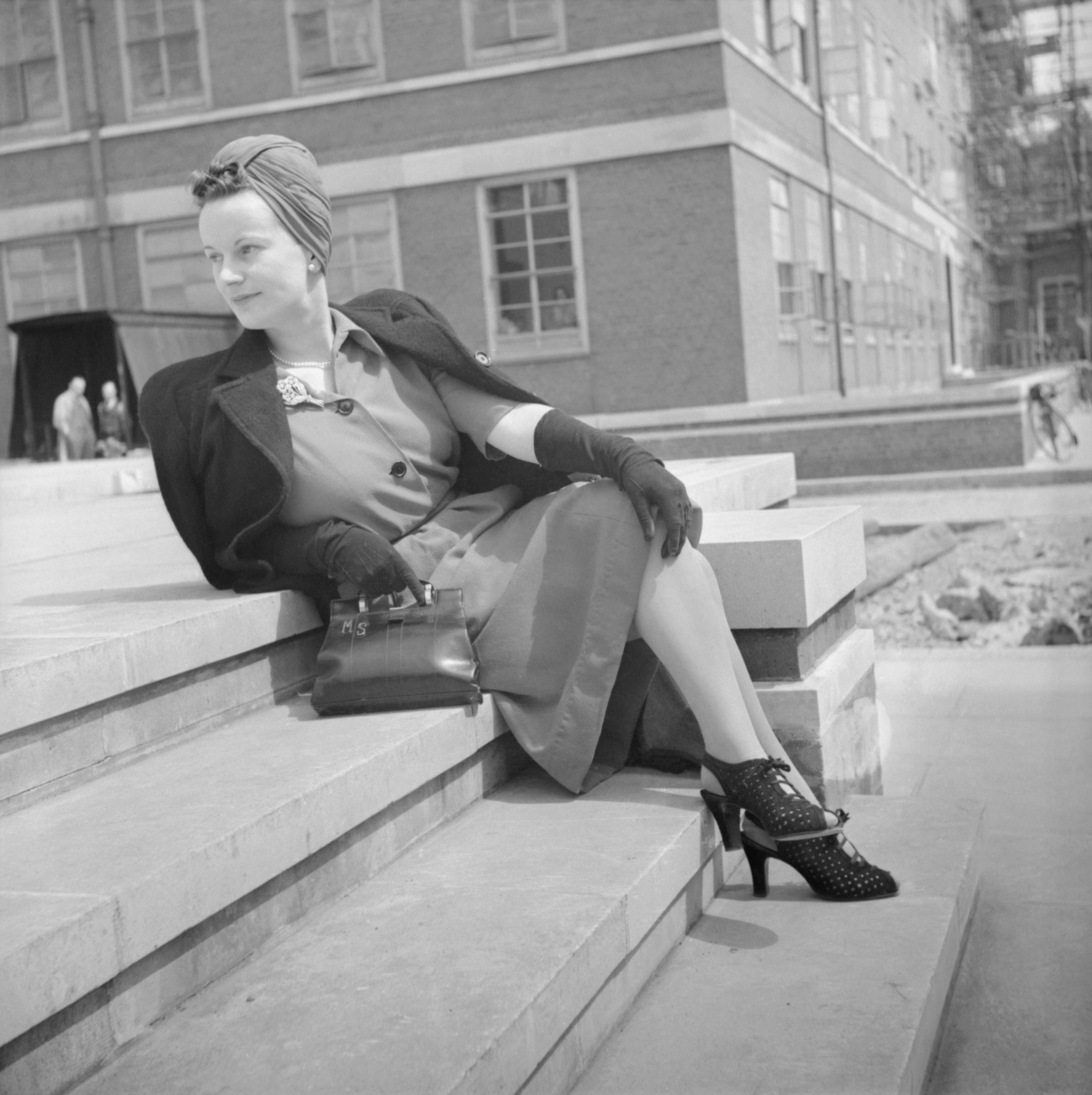
A turban photographed by the Ministry of Information to promote wartime chic

The hat remained popular in Europe throughout wartime – it may have been helped by the fact that women were working in manual jobs in factories and farms. It was a design that could be created with minimal sewing skills and helped to conceal the hair when access to hairdressers, shampoo, and even water, might be limited. Simple patterns for draped turbans had been published from the 1920s. The Ministry of Information in the UK showcased a turban as part of a series of photographs to promote possibilities for wartime chic during a period when utility clothing and rationing were interrupting the traditional fashion industry. While DIY turbans were easy to construct – a wartime British Pathé film even demonstrated how to make a selection of designs with a couple of knotted scarves as part of its Ways and Means series – many materials used for making hats were excluded from the worst rationing strictures during the war, and this may help to explain the rise in whimsical hat styles for those who could afford them.

=== Hollywood-style glamour ===
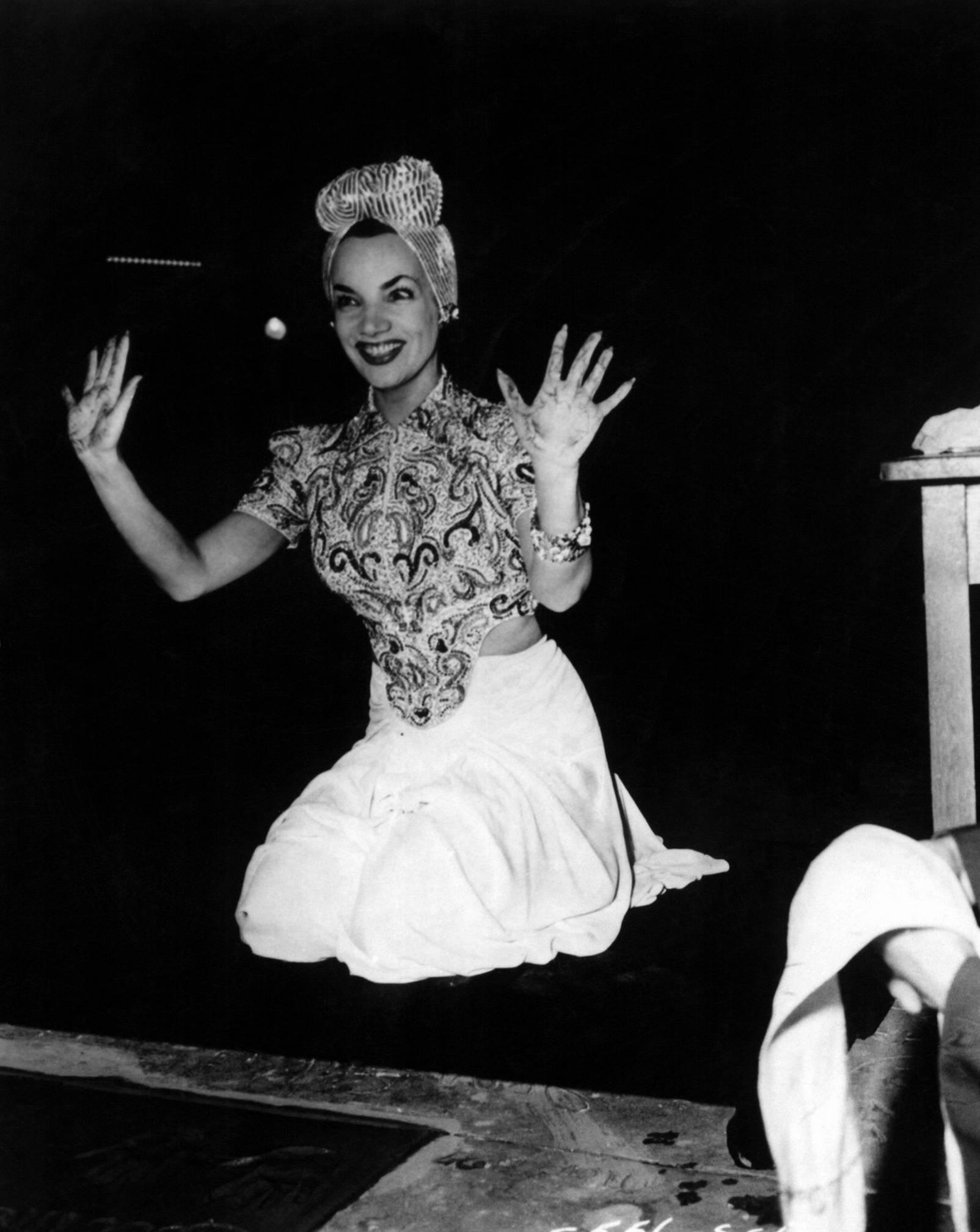
Carmen Miranda wearing a turban, 1941

While the fashion for the turban was partly borne of necessity in Europe, it became chic when it appeared on the heads of Hollywood icons. The French milliner Madame Paulette (Pauline Adam de la Bruyère) is often credited with reviving the turban and claimed to have been inspired by the designs she saw on French girls cycling the streets of Paris during the war. She went on to create hats worn by Gloria Swanson, Marlene Dietrich and Greta Garbo. Later, she would also create designs for fashion houses such as Chanel and Ungaro Madame Agnès, who had trained under Caroline Reboux, was also designing turbans and a black fabric creation with ornate padded top-piece and scarf draping carried under the chin is part of the museum collection of the FIDM in Paris.

While Lana Turner created an iconic image of femme fatale in turban in The Postman Always Rings Twice, the growing US popularity of South American star Carmen Miranda also raised the profile of the draped turban as glamour wear –Miranda wore hers in a variety of extreme permutations in her films. Miranda was a long-time adept of turbants as part of her onstage performing costume, the "Bahiana". The Bahiana turbant had been brought to Brazil by African enslaved women, who later turned into picturesque theatrical characters that Miranda brought to the US.

== 1950s and beyond ==
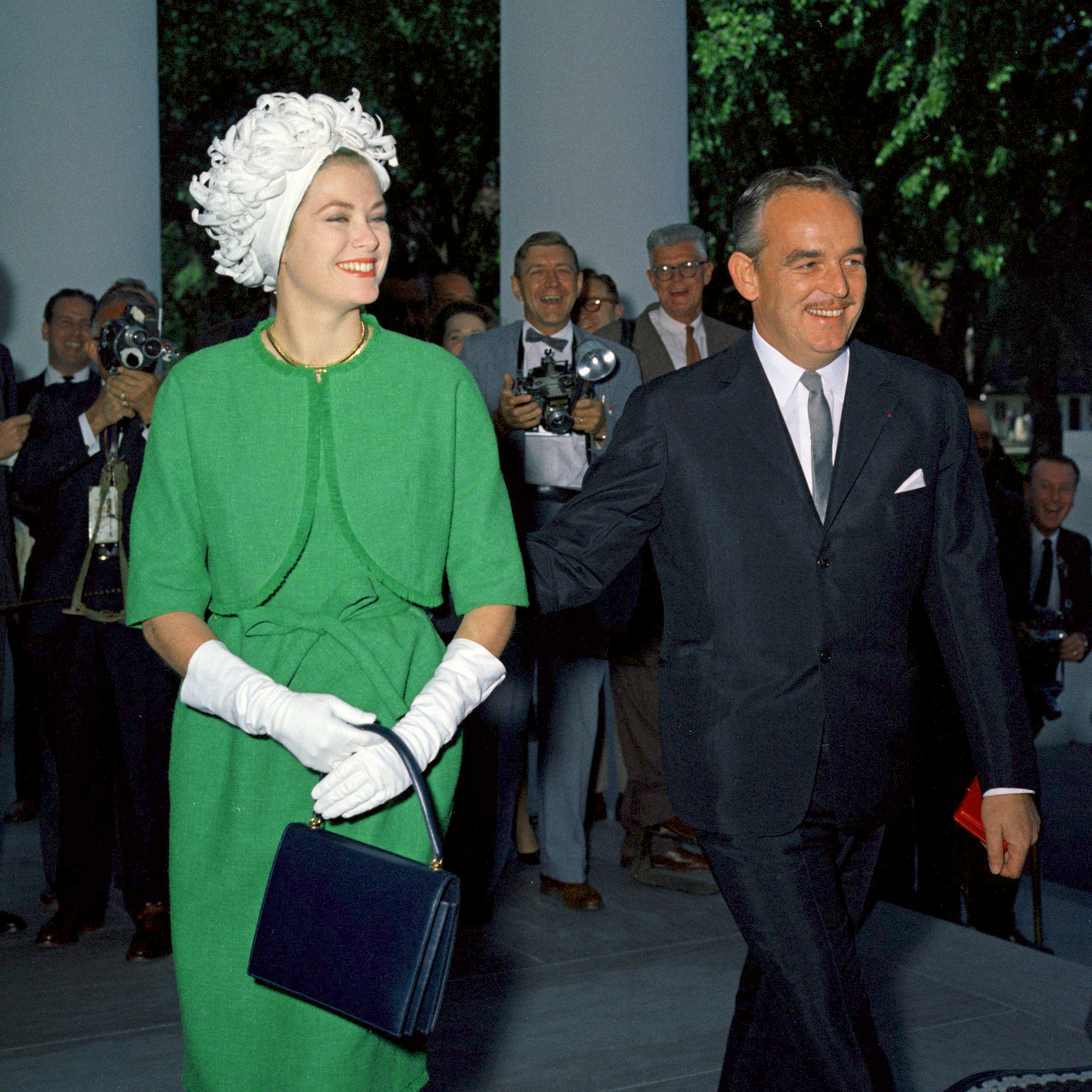
Princess Grace with Prince Rainier III sporting a fashionable turban hat in 1961 at The White House

Versions of the draped turban started to gain in popularity again from the mid-1950s; in 1955, The Times reported on a Dior ensemble taking in the eastern trend and comprising sheath dress in brocaded silk, matching jacket trimmed with sable fur and brocaded silk draped turban. Turban styles were adapted to accommodate more bouffant hair styles. Milliner Claude Saint-Cyr – who designed hats for the Queen – featured a new supple felt turban in 1956 that covered the ears and rose to a draped peak at the back of the head.

In the early 1970s, the London boutique Biba featured turbans, often paired with kaftans or diaphanous blouses – a look in keeping with the prevailing trends for both 1920s/30s and eastern styles. Often turbans were created as part of eveningwear; an example of a Biba evening coat and matching turban in rayon and Lurex knit is now part of the Victoria and Albert Museum archive. American designer Halston also featured the turban for eveningwear, and dressed fashion icons such as Bianca Jagger. The fashion for draped turbans also spread beyond disco glamour – Elizabeth Taylor, Joan Collins and the Queen all wore them with daywear.

=== Modern revivals ===
Turbans were tipped as a potential eveningwear accessory in 2006, as part of a 1970s disco revival. They began appearing on the fashion catwalks in 2007 and made an appearance in Sex and the City 2 – including a gold model from Ralph Lauren's 2009 collection.

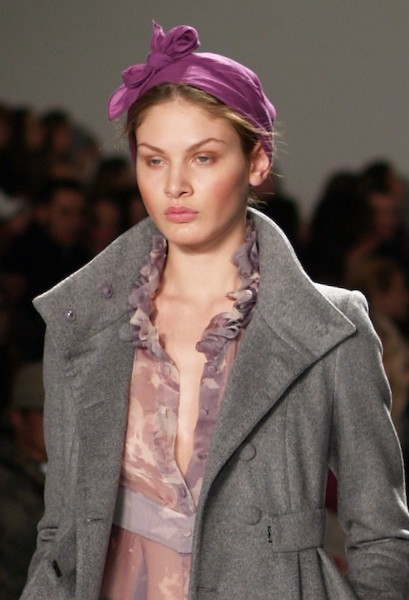
Turban style headgear by Michon Schur, New York Fashion Week 2007
