= Germaine Guérin (designer) =

French handbag designer

Germaine Guérin is a French handbag designer. She opened her first boutique in the 1920s at 243 Rue Saint-Honoré. Her trademark aesthetic was described as bold and understated with notable patrons that included Audrey Hepburn, Vivien Leigh, and the Duchess of Windsor.

== Biography ==
Guérin was born on July 6, 1894, to Paul Adrien Thel Guérin, a goods broker, and Clemence Jeanne Bertholet in 9th arrondissement, Paris. In 1921, Germaine Guérin opened a boutique specializing in handbags. and leather accessories at 243, rue Saint-Honoré, in the 1st arrondissement of Paris. Located near Place Vendôme, the boutique stood at the heart of Parisian elegance.

== Activity ==
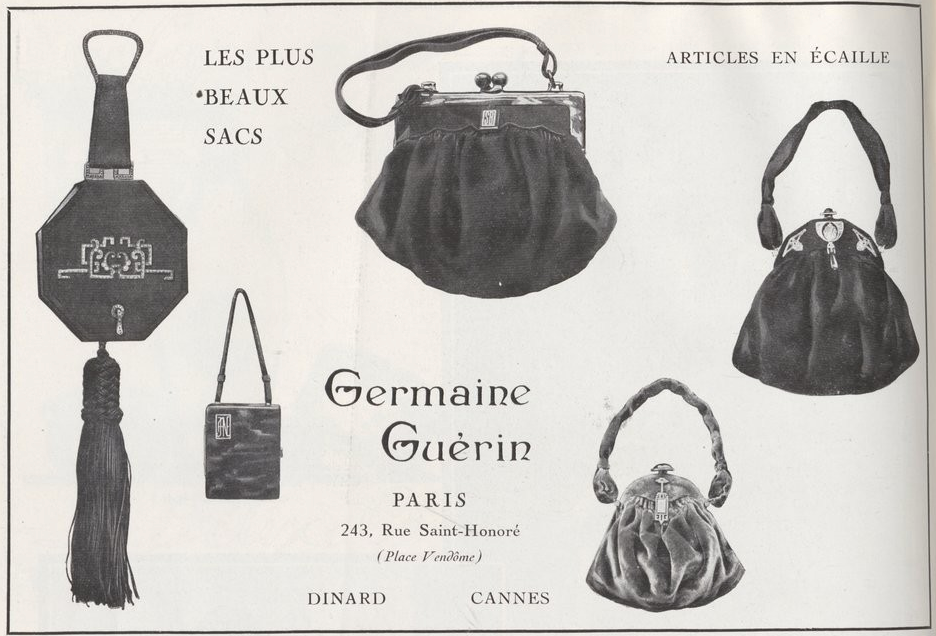
1923 advertisement

Germaine Guérin's creations are distinguished by a style combining simplicity and refinement, in a spirit close to the emerging Art Deco movement, as evidenced by numerous advertisements from the period. The critic Paul Lebroux characterized her designs as bold and understated elegance.

In 1922, two branches were opened in Cannes and Dinard.

In 1925, Germaine Guérin took part in the International Exhibition of Modern Decorative and Industrial Arts in Paris, a landmark event in the history of French design. In 1928, Germaine Guérin was listed in PAN, Annuaire du luxe à Paris, directed by Paul Poiret, alongside several major luxury houses of the time.

In 1931, the literary publicist Paul Reboux wrote: "These bags, all different from one another, share a bold and understated elegance that amounts to a signature."

== Heritage ==
Some journalists, including Grace Coddington in an issue of Vogue US (2005), have highlighted the direct influence of Germaine Guérin on the early leather goods designs of Gabrielle Chanel, particularly in the style of the famous 2.55 bag.

Many bags signed Germaine Guérin are held in the collections of several museums, such as the Musée des Arts Décoratifs in Paris and the Palais Galliera, and regularly appear at auction.

In her 1964 book Elegance, Geneviève Dariaux wrote: “Although I am far from being wealthy, I have been buying my handbags for years from Hermès, Germaine Guérin and Roberta. And, without exception, I have ended up giving away all the inexpensive novelty bags that initially seemed irresistible to me."

== Bibliography ==
- Paul Poiret, PAN, Annuaire du luxe à Paris, 1928.
- Geneviève Antoine Dariaux, Elegance, 1964.
- Grace Coddington, The Chanel Century, Vogue US, 2005.
- Paul Poiret
- Exposition internationale des Arts décoratifs et industriels modernes
- Musée des Arts Décoratifs de Paris
- Palais Galliera
- Grace Coddington
