= Madame Virot =

French milliner

Madame Virot (1826–1911) was a French fashion designer milliner. Alongside Caroline Reboux, she was one of the two most famous hat designers in Paris during the second half of the 19th century.

She was the student of Madame Laure and Madame Alexandrine.

She was one of the favorite designers of the empress of France, Eugénie de Montijo. The empress, who was a major fashion icon of the time, had favorite designers who attended different parts of her wardrobe. In the 1860s, the evening gowns of the empress was designed by Charles Frederick Worth, the morning dresses was made by Madame Laferrière, and the outerwear by Mademoiselle Félicie; Félix Escalier was the hairdresser of the empress, while her the task to design her hats was shared between Madame Virot and Madame Lebel.

The fashions of the empress were copied all over the world, and benefitted the careers of her favorite designers. Because of the patronage of the empress, Madame Virot was able to establish her own studio at the Rue de la Paix nr 12 at Champs-Élysées in Paris in 1860. She was known for her innovative and extravagant taste, and became a role model for other milliners. By the 1880s, she had become a millionaire.
