= Hardcover =

Book bound with a rigid protective cover

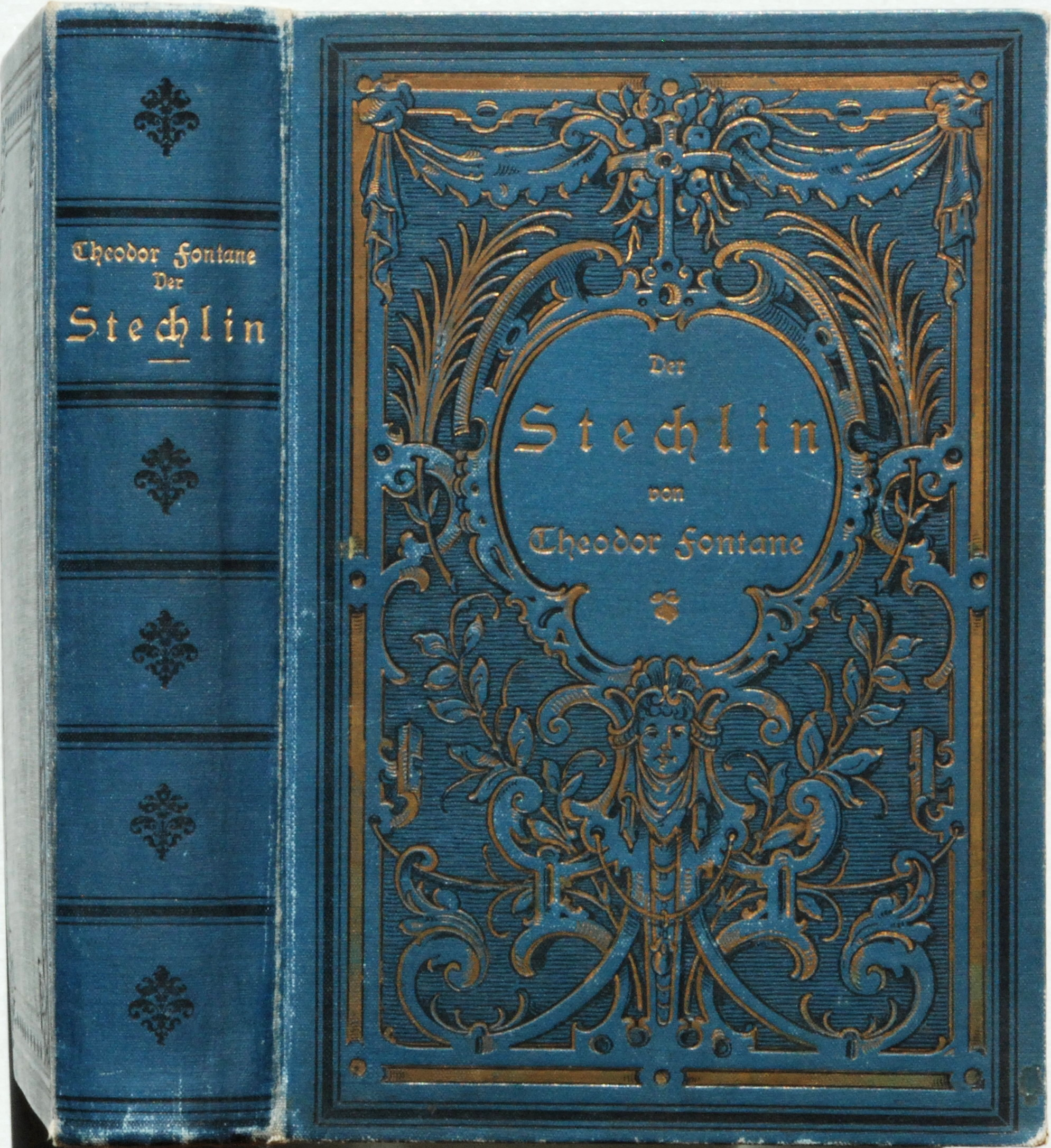
A typical hardcover book (1899), showing wear

A hardcover, hard cover, or hardback (also known as hardbound, and sometimes as casebound) book is one bound with rigid protective covers (typically of binder's board or heavy paperboard covered with buckram or other cloth, heavy paper, or occasionally leather). It has a flexible, sewn spine which allows the book to lie flat on a surface when opened. Modern hardcovers may have the pages glued onto the spine in much the same way as paperbacks. Following the ISBN sequence numbers, books of this type may be identified by the abbreviation Hbk.

== Overview ==
Hardcover books are often printed on acid-free paper, and they are much more durable than paperbacks, which have flexible, easily damaged paper covers. Hardcover books are marginally more costly to manufacture. Hardcovers are frequently protected by artistic dust jackets, but a "jacketless" alternative has increased in popularity: these "paper-over-board" or "jacketless" hardcover bindings forgo the dust jacket in favor of printing the cover design directly onto the board binding.

== Marketing ==
If brisk sales are anticipated, a hardcover edition of a book is typically released first, followed by a "trade" paperback edition (same format as hardcover) the next year. Some publishers publish paperback originals if slow hardback sales are anticipated. For very popular books these sales cycles may be extended, and followed by a mass market paperback edition typeset in a more compact size and printed on thinner, less hardy paper. This is intended to, in part, prolong the life of the immediate buying boom that occurs for some best sellers: After the attention to the book has subsided, a lower-cost version in the paperback, is released to sell further copies. In the past the release of a paperback edition was one year after the hardback, but by the early 21st century paperbacks were released six months after the hardback by some publishers. It is very unusual for a book that was first published in paperback to be followed by a hardback. One example is the novel The Judgment of Paris by Gore Vidal, which had its revised edition of 1961 first published in paperback, and later in hardcover.

== Prices ==
Hardcover books are usually sold at higher prices than comparable paperbacks. Books for the general public are usually printed in hardback only for authors who are expected to be successful, or as a precursor to the paperback to predict sale levels; however, many academic books are often only published in hardcover editions.

== Usual structure ==
Hardcovers usually consist of a page block, two boards, and a cloth or heavy paper covering. The pages are sewn together and glued onto a flexible spine between the boards, and it too is covered by the cloth. A paper wrapper, or dust jacket, is usually put over the binding, folding over each horizontal end of the boards. Dust jackets serve to protect the underlying cover from wear. On the folded part, or flap, over the front cover is generally a blurb, or a summary of the book. The back flap is where the biography of the author can be found. Reviews are often placed on the back of the jacket. Many modern bestselling hardcover books use a partial cloth cover, with a cloth-covered board on the spine only, and only boards covering the rest of the book.

== Gallery ==
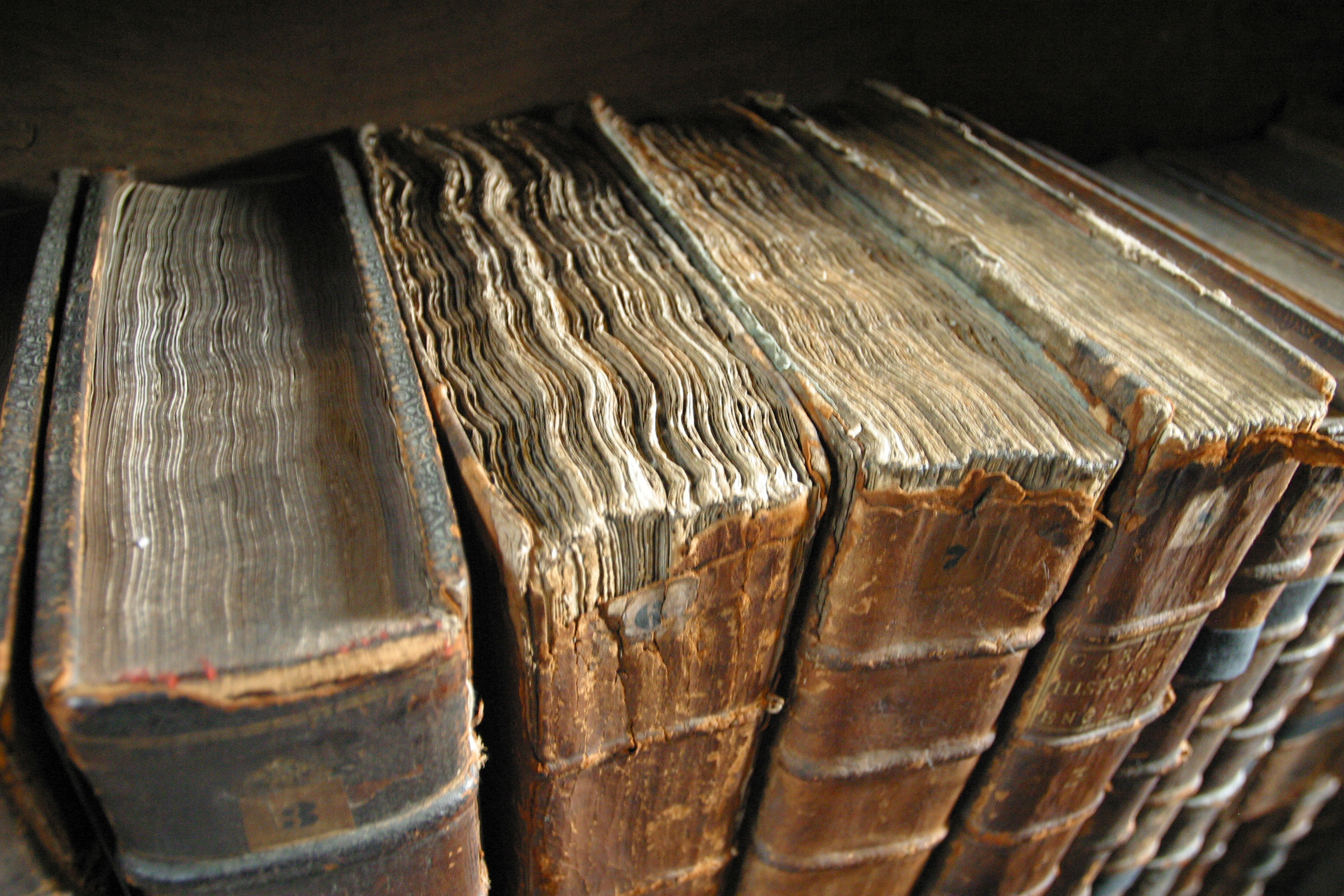
Old hardcover books at the Merton College library

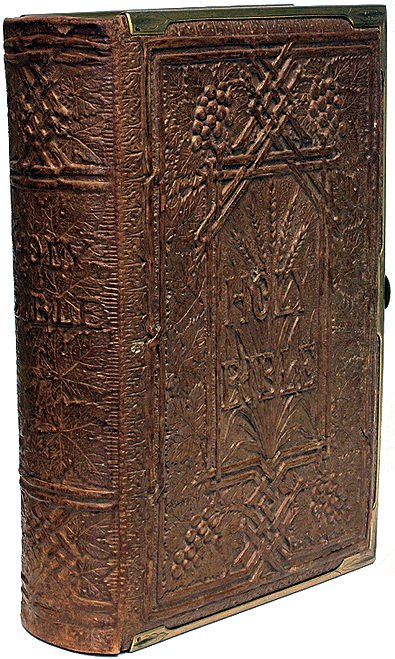
The Holy Bible—Relievo leather‑bound edition (1864)

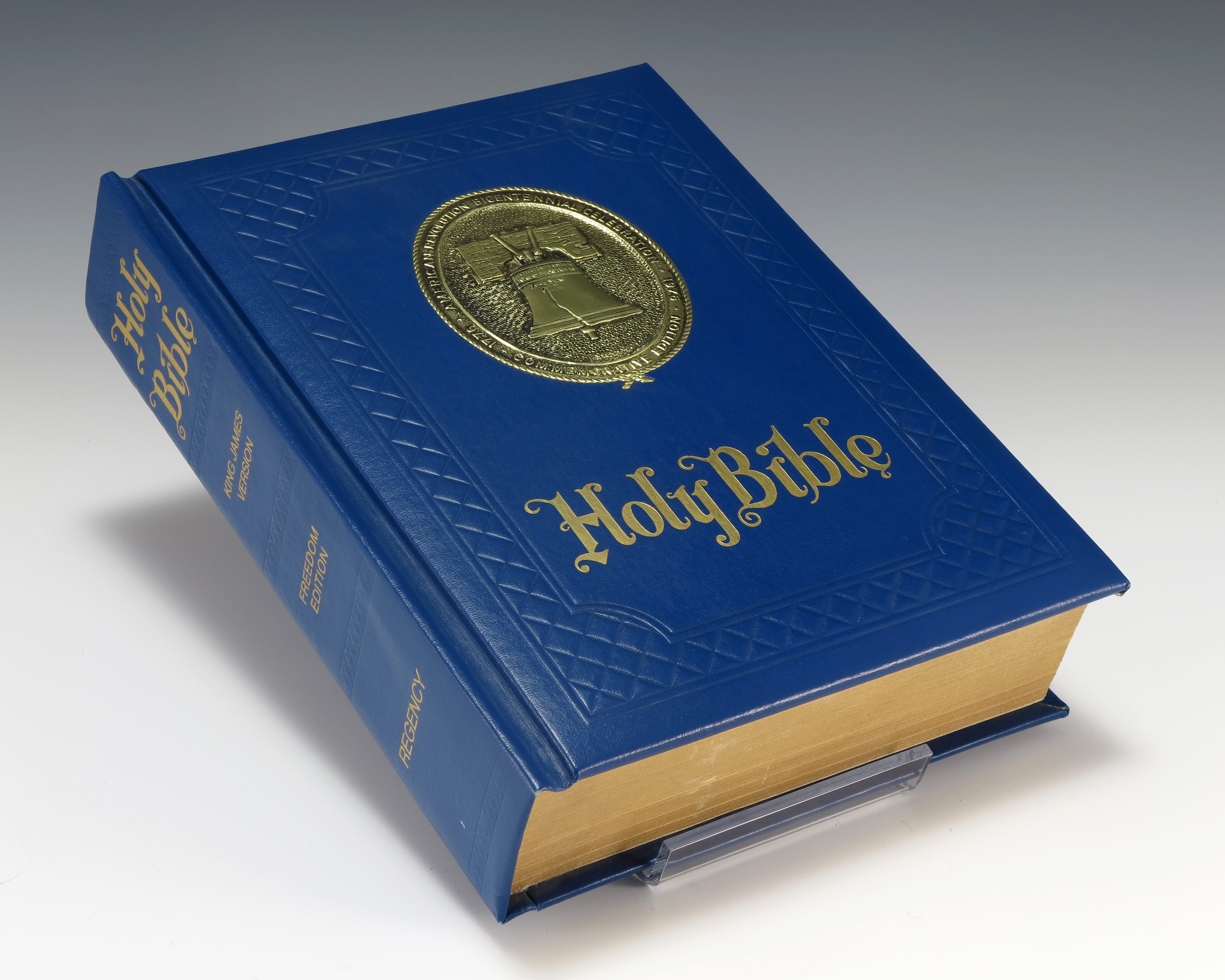
A King James Bible bound in blue faux-leather cloth

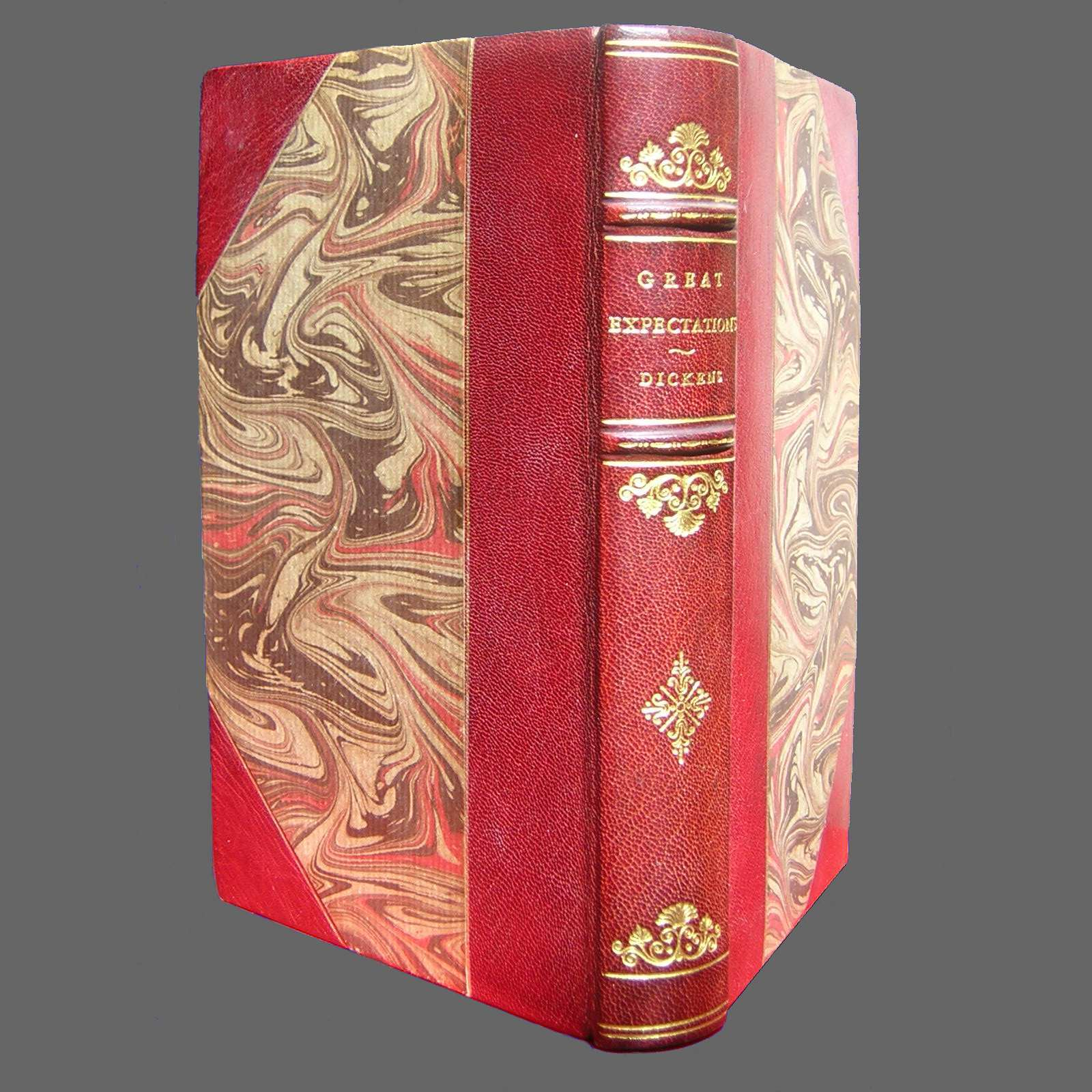
Hardbound book with half leather binding (spine and corners) and marbled boards

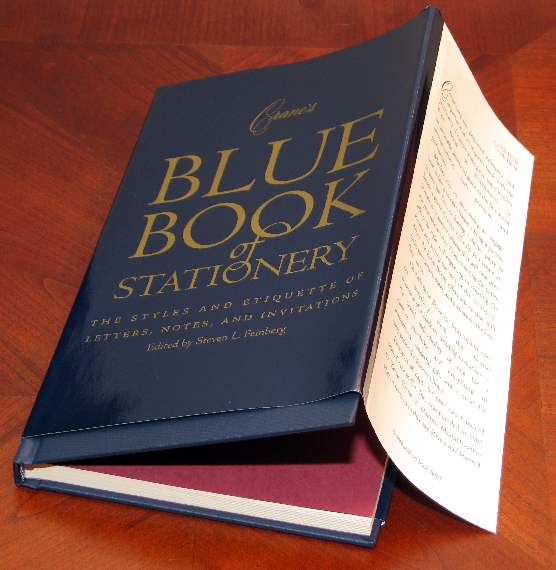
Dust jacket on a hardcover book

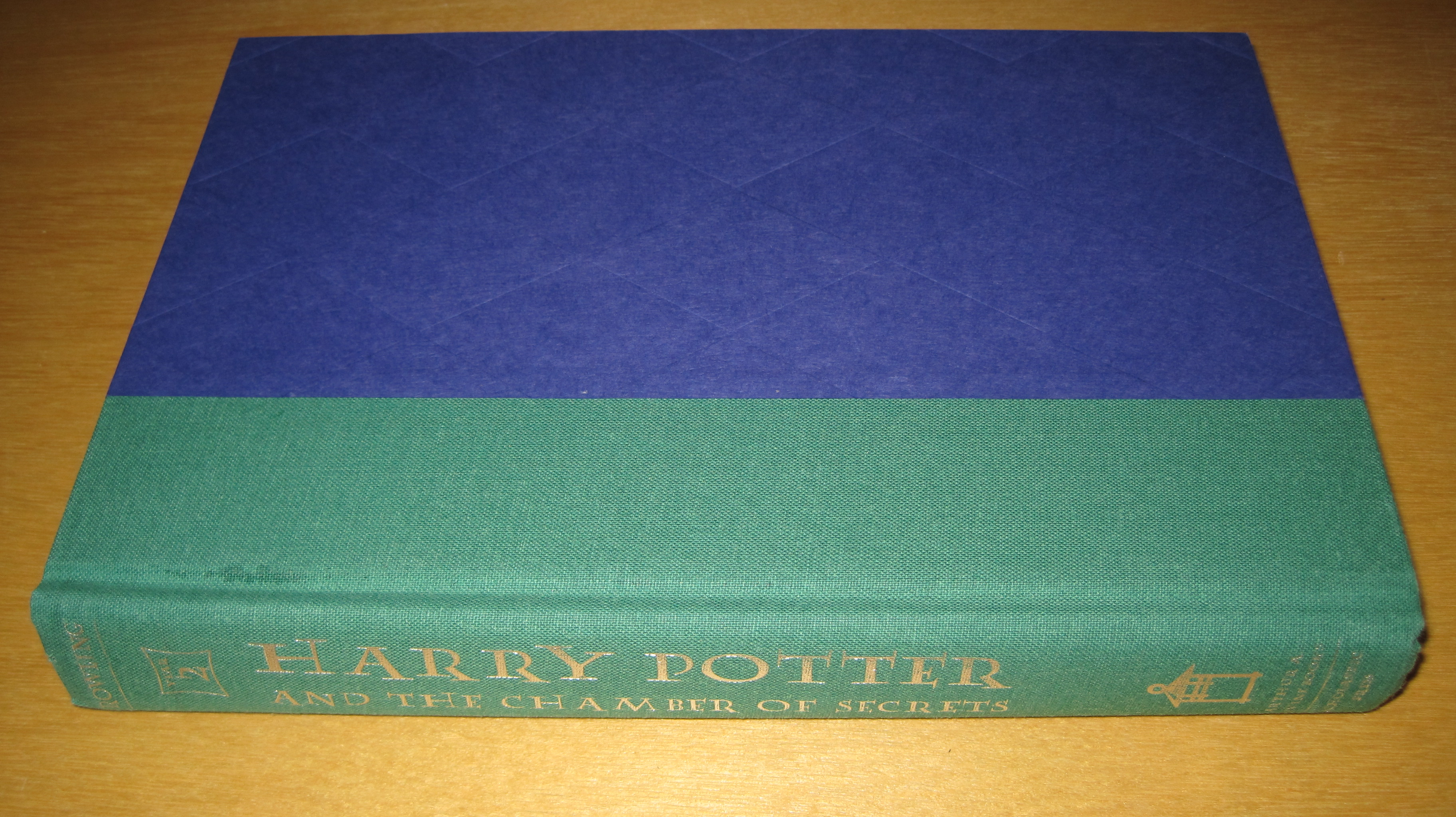
Contemporary hardcover, with partial cloth cover, on the spine only, and boards for the rest

== See also ==
- Book size
- Softcover
