= John Boyd (milliner) =

Scottish milliner (1925–2018)

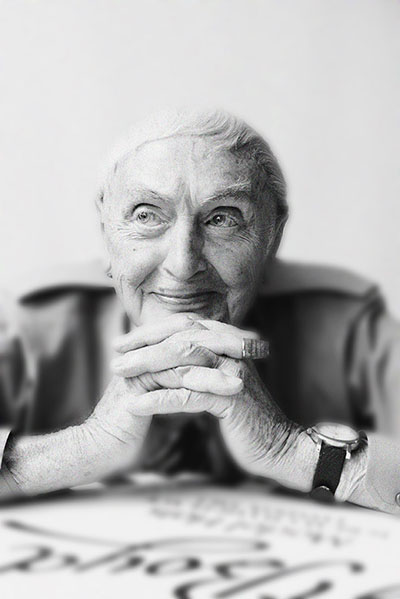
- Born: 5 April 1925
- Died: 20 February 2018 (aged 92)
- Occupation: Milliner
- Awards: MBE
- Website: www.johnboydhats.co.uk

John Richardson Boyd MBE (5 April 1925 – 20 February 2018) was a Scottish milliner based in London. Designing hats for over seventy-five years, Boyd was one of London's most respected milliners and is known for his creations for Diana, Princess of Wales and Anne, Princess Royal. Boyd was a milliner to three generations of Diana's family – Diana, her mother Frances Shand Kydd and grandmother Ruth Roche, Baroness Fermoy – and had remained at the centre of his craft adding another generation of royals with Catherine, Duchess of Cambridge. Boyd had one of the longest millinery careers in the world whilst continuing to practise his art before his death in 2018. Boyd’s label continues with his protégé and senior milliner Sarah Marshall.

== Early life ==
Boyd was born in Edinburgh, Scotland in 1925. Boyd served his apprenticeship in Grosvenor Square with the Danish, Royal milliner Aage Thaarup who, along with Otto Lucas, were the most famous names in London millinery. Working with Thaarup from 1941, Boyd's apprenticeship was interrupted in 1943 when he was conscripted for World War II. After three years in the Royal Navy and taking part in the D-Day landings, Boyd was demobbed in 1946 and opened his first atelier in a London basement with his war time gratuity. Working with the fashion designer Clive Duncan who, like Thaarup had royal connections, Boyd received many commissions and designing hats for Duncan's first London show in 1947, their work attracted buyers from Paris.

Here everyone was still wearing utility clothing which was plain, plain, plain. The visitors from Paris arrived wearing the New Look from Dior and we were flabbergasted! They had beautiful wide brims, waisted dresses and skirts that were so full they touched both sides of the door…it was absolutely fantastic. I had never seen anything like it in my life before.

— John Boyd

== Millinery career ==
By the 1950s with the continued growth of prêt-à-porter millinery was in decline, but Boyd's clientele continued to grow and in the mid 50s he took a shop in the Brompton Arcade. Through Thaarup and Duncan, Boyd had gained entry to royal circles and was now creating designs for Baroness Fermoy, followed by her daughter Frances which would eventually lead to his most famous customer Diana, Princess of Wales, Fermoy's granddaughter.

1967 was a turning point for Boyd when he made a hat for Princess Anne, then 17, launching a tanker in the north of England. Boyd continued to design for the princess and with her sombrero, lemon bowler and black stetson breaking the mould, Anne was making fashion headlines worldwide. Boyd's hats, already a name in Mayfair and Belgravia were now seen across the globe. The beginning of the 1980s increased Boyd's exposure with the arrival of Lady Diana Spencer, the future Princess of Wales and soon to be the most photographed woman in the world. The pink tricorn Boyd made for Diana was seen by millions of people and was copied worldwide. Diana's appearance was a defining moment for couture millinery and rebooted an entire industry in decline for decades. With the acceptance of Caroline Reboux's millinery as haute couture and Boyd's popularity, the door was opened for the creations of Stephen Jones and Philip Treacy who finally made millinery Objet d'art, liberated from the demand of the client to the desire of the maker.

Boyd created many designs for the Princess of Wales and his client list would eventually grow to include Princess Michael of Kent, Baroness Thatcher, Lady Soames, Viscountess Daventry and many other ladies of high society. In 1985, Boyd designed hats for the Pirelli Calendar, with Norman Parkinson behind the camera, clothes and shoes by Zandra Rhodes, Jasper Conran, Bruce Oldfield, Manolo Blahnik and Iman as the model. Fourteen leading British Designers had been invited to make clothes and accessories for the shoot which represented a significant break-away from the traditional Pirelli calendars. At the calendar launch the collection was auctioned for charity and later the owners gifted these unique works to the V&A museum. Boyd was appointed a Member of the Order of the British Empire (MBE) in the 2014 Birthday Honours for services to the fashion industry. Boyd's atelier is currently in Knightsbridge, London, where his work is continued by his three milliners Sarah Marshall, Ellie Vallerini and Pia Pertulla. In 2015, he launched a vintage line. Many of Boyd's hats can also be seen at the nearby V&A museum.

== Charity work ==
Boyd hosted a hat show every year with the debutantes at The Berkeley Dress Show, organised by The London Season which supports a different charity each year. In 2012 Boyd took part in HATWALK, a mayor of London initiative with Grazia magazine in the run up to the London Summer Olympics. In 2013 Boyd designed masks for 'The Animal Ball' to raise funds for The Elephant Family. In March 2014 Boyd designed hats for the 'Grand Hatter's Tea Party', hosted by Peter Lewis-Crown OBE in aid of The National Lobster Hatchery.

== See also ==
- Stephen Jones, milliner
- Claude Saint-Cyr, milliner
- Caroline Reboux, milliner
- Philip Treacy, milliner
