= Buckram =

Stiff cloth of cotton, linen, or horsehair

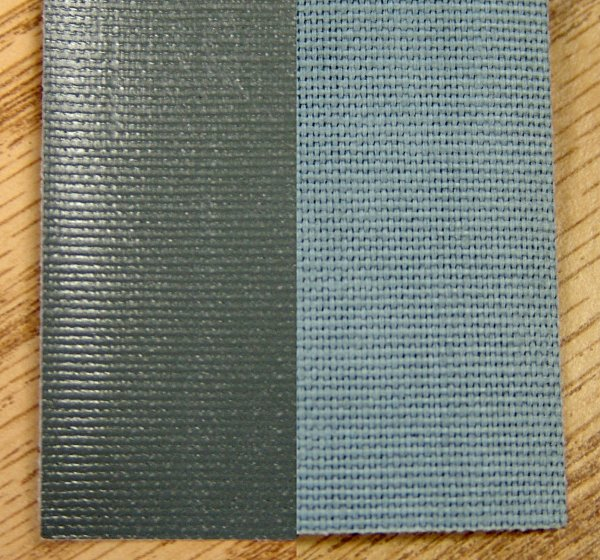
- Buckram can be shiny or dull.
- Material type: Cloth

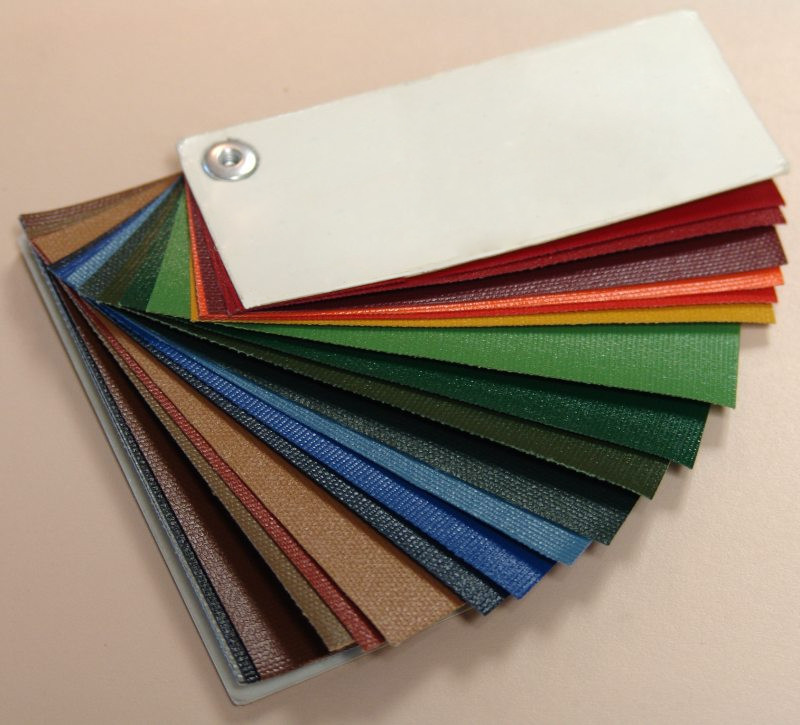
Buckram is available in many colors.

Buckram is a stiff cotton, or occasionally, linen or horse-hair cloth with a plain, usually loose, weave, produced in various weights similar to muslin and other plain-weave fabrics. The fabric is soaked in a sizing agent such as wheat-starch paste, glue (such as PVA glue), or pyroxylin (gelatinized nitrocellulose, developed around 1910), then dried. When rewetted or warmed, it can be shaped to create durable firm fabric for book covers, hats, and elements of clothing.

== Etymology ==
In the Middle Ages, "bokeram" simply designated a fine cotton cloth. The etymology of the term remains uncertain; the Oxford English Dictionary considers the commonly mentioned derivation from the name of the city of Bokhara unlikely.

== Use in bookbinding ==
Several of buckram's qualities make it attractive for bookbinding. Highly durable, buckram does not allow the bookbinder's paste to seep through and discolor or stain the book's front and back covers.

Pyroxylin-impregnated buckram is often favored due to its resistance to water, insects, fungi, and general wear. This is especially important for library binding, where many people will be repeatedly handling the same books. However, pyroxylin fabrics are less chemically stable than starch-filled fabrics and can be affected by extreme temperatures.

== Use in millinery ==
Millinery buckram is impregnated with a starch which allows it to be softened in water, pulled over a hat block, and left to dry into a hard shape. Millinery buckram comes in many weights, including lightweight or baby buckram (often used for children's and dolls' hats), single-ply buckram, and double buckram (also known as theatrical buckram or crown buckram).
