= The Millinery Shop =

Painting by Edgar Degas

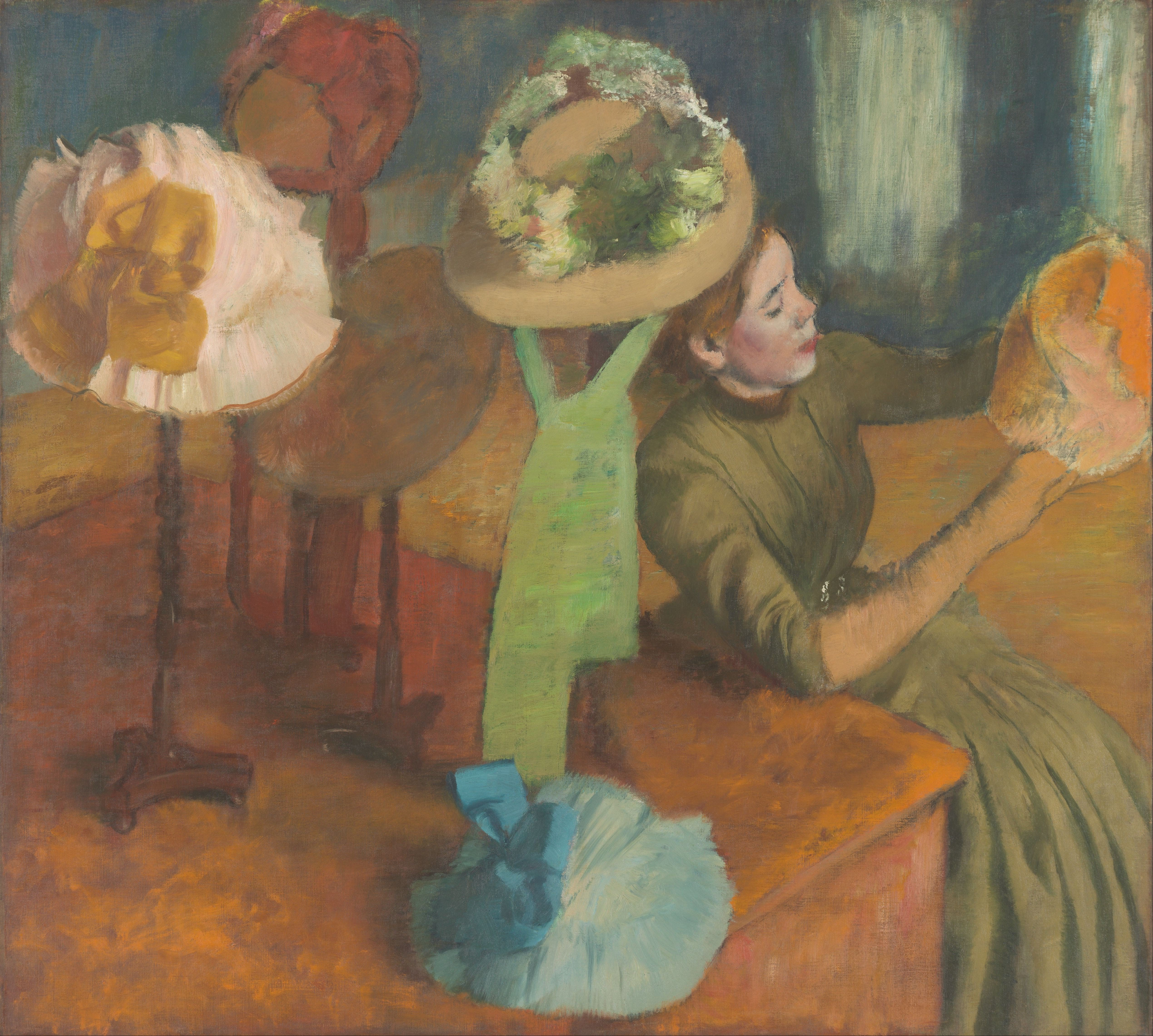
- Artist: Edgar Degas
- Year: 1879–1886
- Catalogue: L832
- Medium: Oil on canvas
- Dimensions: 100 cm × 110.7 cm (39 in × 43.6 in)
- Location: The Art Institute of Chicago, Chicago
- Accession: 1933.428

The Millinery Shop is an oil on canvas painting by the French Impressionist artist Edgar Degas created between 1879 and 1886. It illustrates a young woman, perhaps a hat-maker or a shop customer, seated at a table examining a hat in her hands and additional hats on wooden stands. The colorful and fashionable hats take up most the frame. At 100 x 110.7 cm, it is the largest work Degas created on the subject of milliners. The painting is in the collection of the Art Institute of Chicago.

== Impressionism ==
The painting includes many techniques characteristic of Degas's work and the Impressionist movement. Degas often painted his subjects from unconventional angles. The woman seated at the table is painted from a uniquely elevated angle that positions the viewer above her. Degas often used Impressionist techniques like abrupt cropping and asymmetrical composition as well. The composition of the painting is structured so that the hats take up more space than the subject at the table, giving the work a sense of spatial imbalance. Degas, like many other Impressionists, was interested in capturing images of urban modern life through the fleeting moments of the everyday. His choice to depict a woman either working or shopping in a trendy millinery shop reflects this. The use of bold pastel colors, such as the bright greens, yellows, and blues, is also characteristic of Impressionist painters.

== Identity of the woman ==
It is unclear whether Degas intended for the woman depicted in The Millinery Shop to be a customer or shop worker. The Art Institute of Chicago suggests her identity is deliberately left unidentifiable. However, several art historians describe her as a worker. Art historian Gloria Groom points out that Degas seemingly painted her with a look of concentration on her face, as if she were working on the hat in her hands with great attention to detail. This is indicated by her attentive gaze and pursed lips presumedly holding a pin. Art historians Richard Brettell and Suzanne McCullagh more assertively argue that she is a milliner. They suggest that the unique positioning of the yellow hat just above the head of the woman creates a sense that she "...is juxtaposed with the tangible results of her labor, which she is destined not to wear."

X-ray photographs and early sketches suggest the painting went through several changes before its finalized version. These x-rays show that Degas originally showed the woman wearing an ornate hat and a dress with lace trim on the sleeves. This suggests she was perhaps originally going be a bourgeois customer rather than an employee and in the process of creating the work her identity changed. An early pastel study of the painting Degas titled At the Milliner's shows that the woman at first had an elegant yellow hat, further indicating she was originally meant to be a customer.

== Parisian millinery ==
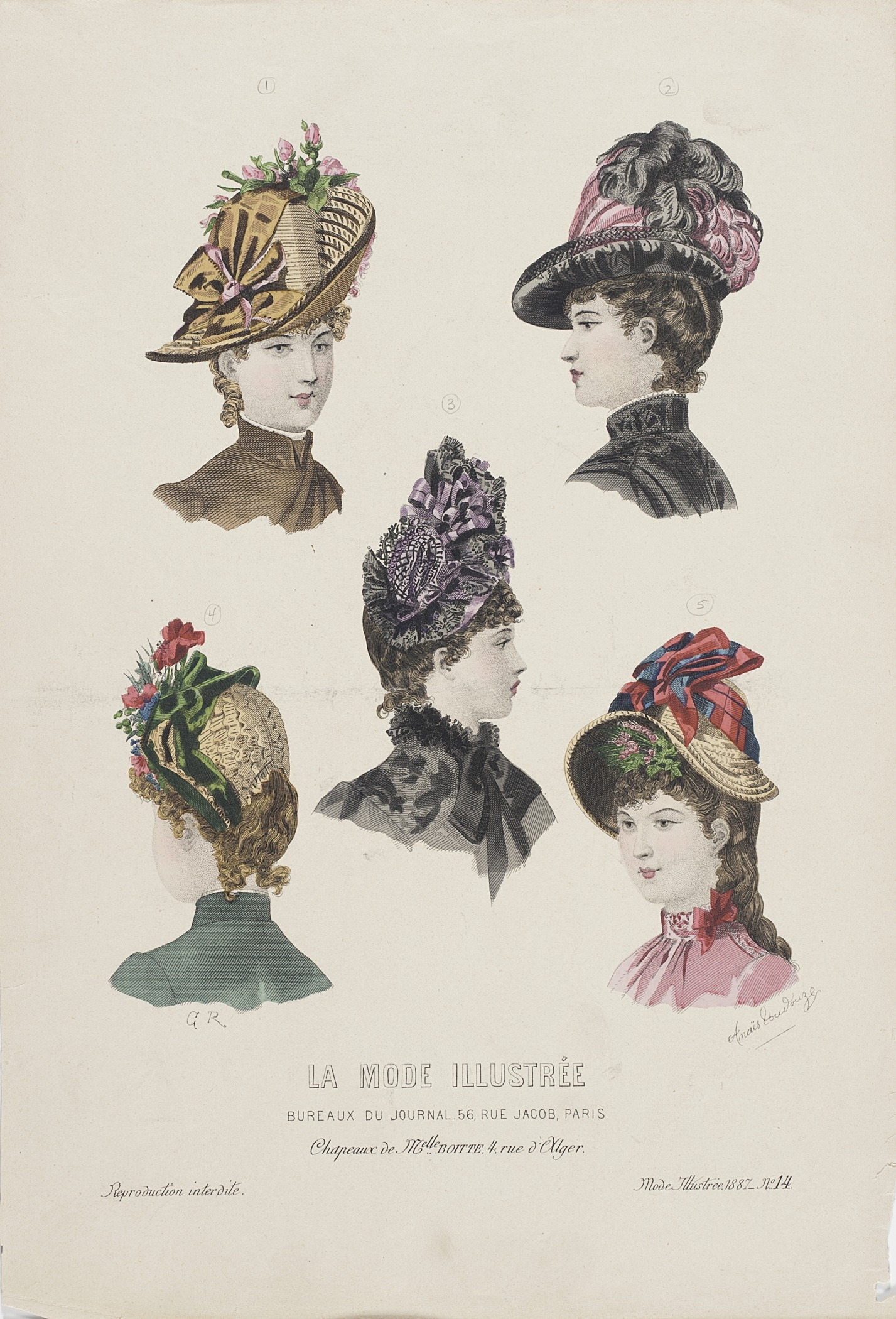
Millinery print from 1887 depicting fashionable French hats

According to the art historians Simon Kelly and Esther Bell, the hats on the table "reflect the very latest fashions for spring and summer in the early 1880s." Of note are the wide range of fabrics, colors, and materials used to make the hats. The hats occupy much of the space in the painting, accentuated by the sparse flooring and walls inside the shop. This suggests Degas was interested in how contemporary fashions were shaping art and French consumer culture. During Degas's lifetime, the millinery trade was booming—Paris had undergone a significant urban renewal campaign in the mid 19th century which reinvigorated the economy. This meant Parisians with disposable income had money to spend on commercial goods and fashionable items, like hats. Degas even likened the artist's studio to the milliner's shop. The hat-making industry had certain parallels to the artist's creative process that clearly inspired Degas to make The Millinery Shop. Kelly and Bell observe that millinery was "a central element in Degas's analysis of Parisian modern life, fashion, and especially the world of trade and commerce."

== Sale ==
Degas sold the work to notable French art dealer Paul Durand-Ruel in 1913 for 50,000 francs. This was the most money Degas had generated from a work on the milliner subject. Durand-Ruel then sold the work to Chicago-based patent lawyer Lewis L. Coburn in January 1932 for approximately $36,000. It was then given to the Art Institute of Chicago in 1933.
