= Jean Barthet =

French milliner (1920–2000)

- Born: 1920; Nay, Pyrénées-Atlantiques, France
- Died: February 2000 (aged 79–80)
- Occupation: Milliner

Signature
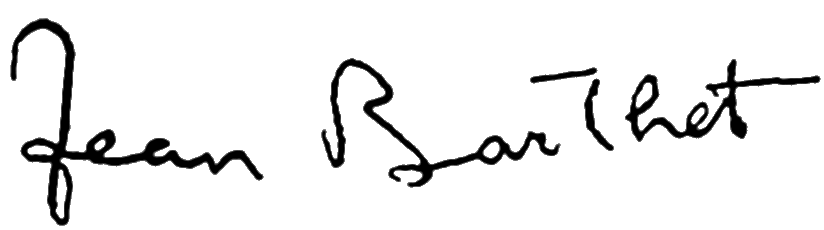

Jean Barthet (1920–2000) was a French milliner who first rose to prominence in the 1950s as hat maker to Hollywood and French film stars, also designing hats for films such as The Young Girls of Rochefort.

He helped to define fashionable hat styles – including the bucket hat, pillbox hat and fedora – that predominated throughout the 1960s and collaborated with major couture houses. With a career spanning more than 40 years, he remained a favourite hatmaker of Sophia Loren (both for film and personal wear), also creating hats for Michael Jackson's 1988 world tour.

== Early life and career ==
Jean Barthet was born in Nay, a village in the Pyrenees region of France in 1920 – although he would later put his date of birth as 1930/1. After studying at art college in Toulouse, he left for Paris, working for the milliner Gilbert Orcel before setting up his own salon.

== International reputation ==
Barthet presented his first collection in 1949 and soon attracted an international clientele – notable among them were many Hollywood stars. He introduced hat styles that attracted newspaper publicity, including a white felt hat inspired by the Texas sheriff's sombrero and a feminine variation on the fedora.

By the early 1960s his clients included Jacqueline Kennedy. By the mid 1960s, such was his client list that the Chicago Tribune said Barthet had: "more star quality customers than any Hollywood studio ever had under contract". These included names such as Sophia Loren, Natalie Wood, Brigitte Bardot and Princess Grace of Monaco.

His collaborations with haute couture houses continued from his early career into the 1980s and he worked with, among others, André Courrèges, Chanel, Claude Montana, Sonia Rykiel, Paco Rabanne and Karl Lagerfeld. He collaborated with another notable milliner, Parisian-born Claude Saint-Cyr, who worked with him from the mid 1960s to her retirement in the early 1970s.

== Legacy ==
Examples of Barthet's hats are in a number of public collections, including the Victoria and Albert Museum and the Metropolitan Museum of Art. In 2011, a vintage Barthet hat featured in a Lady Gaga shoot in Vanity Fair. In 2014, reproductions inspired by his original models were created by his son Alexandre Barthet for the biopic Grace of Monaco.

Barthet was also a keen photographer and his extensive photo archive includes portraits of musicians, actors and fashion designers – some of whom are captured wearing his hat designs.
