= Walter Wright Hats =

English hat mauufacturer

Walter Wright
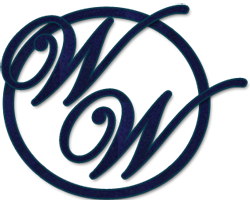

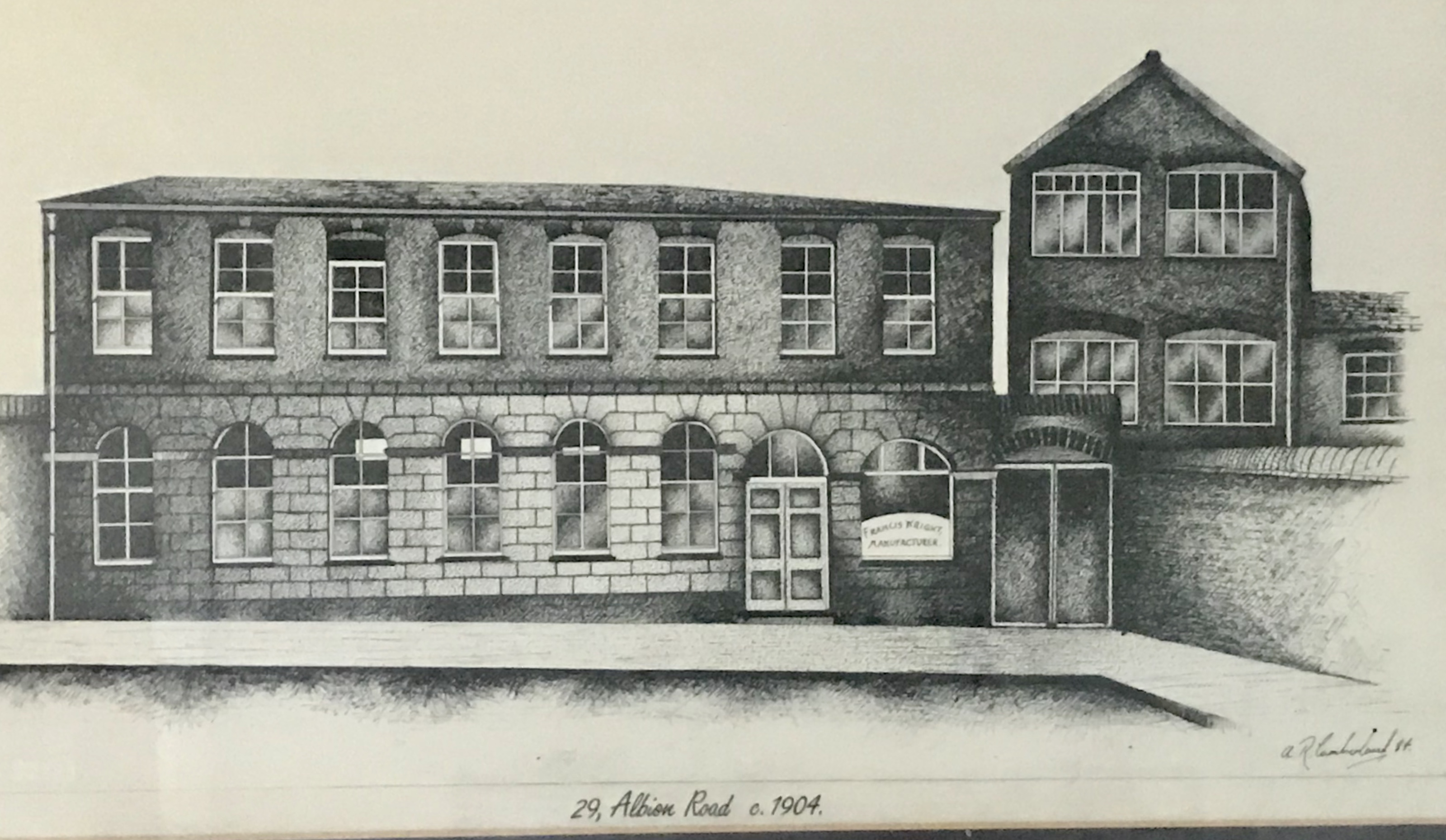
- Walter Wright hat factory, 1904
- Industry: Clothing
- Founded: 1889 in Luton, Bedfordshire, England
- Founder: Walter Wright
- Headquarters: 29 Albion Rd, Luton LU2 0DS, United Kingdom
- Products: Hats
- Website: www.hatsbyphilipwright.co.uk

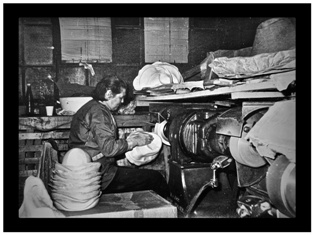

Walter Wright hat manufacturer is one of the last remaining active hat factories in Luton, Bedfordshire from the time when it was the centre of hat manufacture in the UK and giving the name 'The Hatters' to Luton FC.

== Hat making in Luton ==
At the beginning of the 1800s the Napoleonic Wars blocked imports of straw plait and hats from the continent so Luton's businessmen and women set up factories both large and small to supply local and national markets with straw hats. As a result, the town expanded significantly in size and population from the mid 1800s onwards. Between the mid 19th and mid 20th centuries the hatting industry so dominated the town that hat-making became synonymous with Luton.

The Wright family have been involved in the manufacture of hats continuously for 300 years in Luton and the current Albion Road factory, which was founded by Walter Wright in 1889 with his wife Minnie Susan, is alleged to be the first custom built hat factory in Luton without a residence.

== Current activity ==
The current proprietor Philip Wright is the fourth generation of his family to manufacture hats at the original site. After serving his apprenticeship Philip went on to study at the London College of Fashion which gave Walter Wright's traditional designs a new lease of life. Originally a major supplier to high street shops, demands from the retail industry worldwide for constantly cheaper prices and mass-produced product has forced the company of Walter Wright to focus on the bespoke high end of the market.

The factory is one of the last from the Victorian era in the UK to have all its original equipment and manufacturing processes intact and Philip runs regular 'Factory Tours' so the public can see hats being made from beginning to end. Philip also gives regular speeches on the Luton Hat Trade to social groups, historical societies, schools, colleges and universities.

The heritage of the factory has made Walter Wright Hats and Philip a popular subject for many TV programmes including Salvage Hunters and Michael Portillo's Great British Railway Journeys.

Walter Wright's long association with the Royal Family making hats for Anne, Princess Royal and Bearskin hats for the Coldstream Guards has led to royal visits including from Charles, Prince of Wales.
