= Hat block =

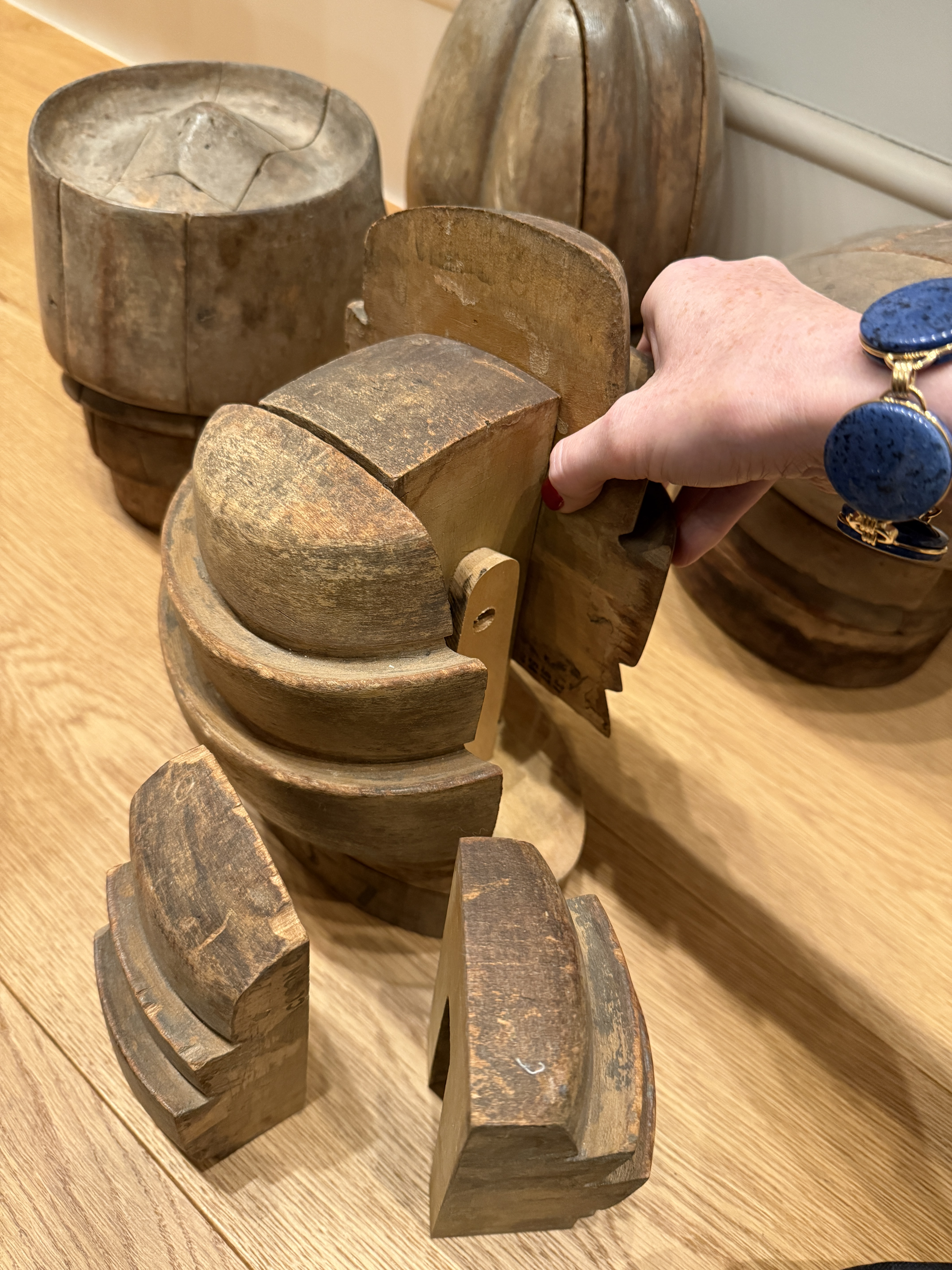
Hat block being taken apart like a puzzle

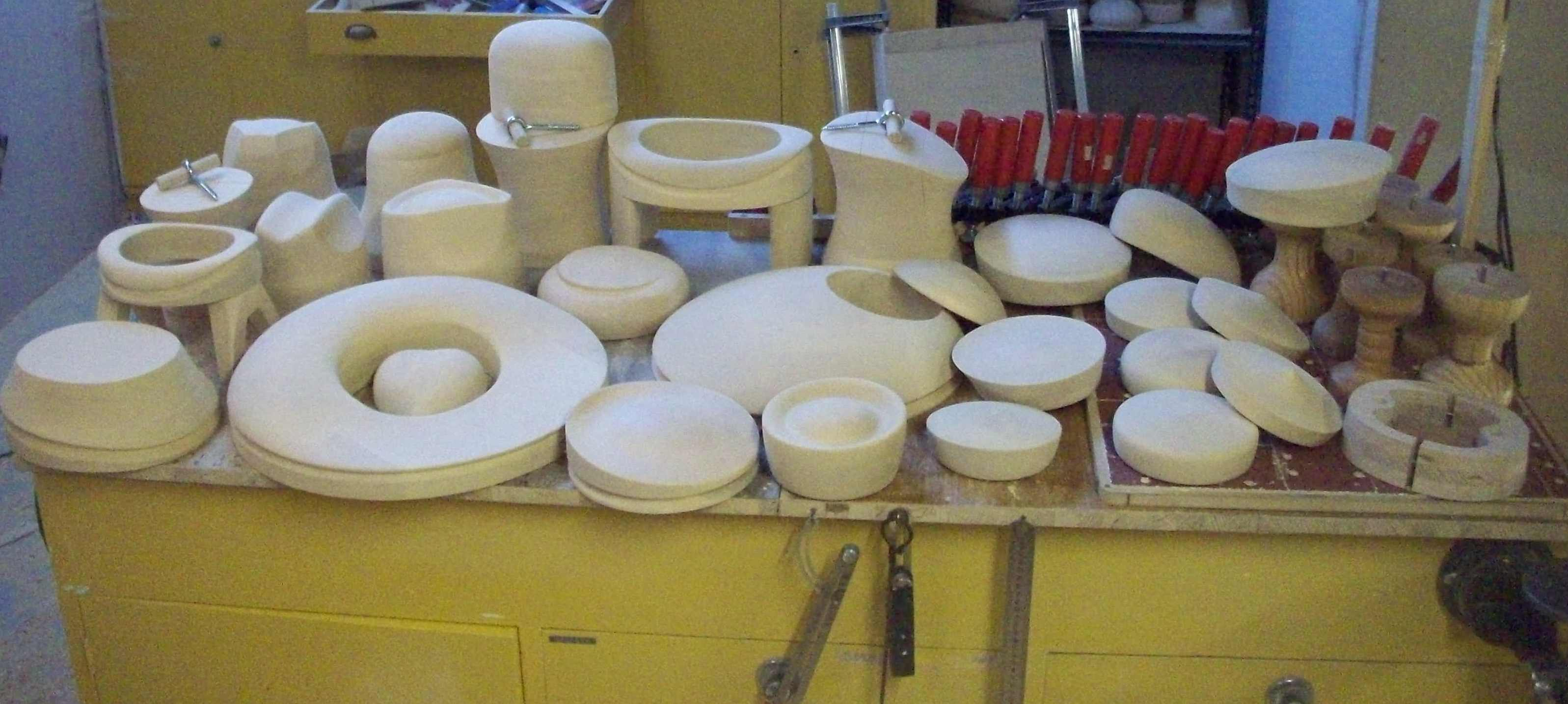
A selection of hat blocks

A hat block, also known as a hat form or bashing block, is a wooden block carved into the shape of a hat by a craftsman known as a block shaper. It is used by hat makers and milliners to produce a hat.

Today there are only a handful of block shapers left. In the United Kingdom, hat block making has been listed as an endangered craft by the Heritage Crafts Association, with three remaining hat block making businesses still in operation as of 2022.
