= Benny Andallo =

Milliner / accessories designer

- Born: Benedict Junior Andallo; 1992 (age 33–34); Islington, London, England
- Education: Central Saint Martins
- Years active: 2017–present

Benedict Junior Andallo (born 1992) is an English hat designer. He is known for his avant-garde, psychedelic and whimsical style of hats, which have been worn by a number of public figures.

== Biography ==
Andallo was born in Islington, North London to Filipino parents and grew up on an estate. At age 17, he became an assistant to designer Nasir Mazhar. Andallo graduated with a Bachelor of Arts (BA) in Menswear from Central Saint Martins in 2015. He earned a British Fashion Council scholarship to stay on for a Master of Arts (MA), but did not finish.

After exiting his MA course, Andallo worked at Goodhood. He made hats for himself and started posting the designs on Instagram in 2017, which garnered public and buyer interest. Andallo reunited with Nasir Mazhar, who liked Andallo's designs and invited him to join Fantastic Toiles, Mazhar's avant-garde boutique and collective. Via Fantastic Toiles, Andallo's early sales included Kiko Mizuhara and Rihanna. As of 2020, he hand-sewed all of his hats. His products have also been stocked with the online retailer APOC.

Junya Watanabe invited Andallo to collaborate on the brand's autumn/winter 2022 men's collection. In 2024, Andallo starting making digital designs for SKNUP and Roblox UK.

== Personal life ==
As of 2023, Andallo lives in Newington Green. He spoke of having a boyfriend circa 2019.
