= Paul Reboux =

French writer, humorist, literary critic and painter

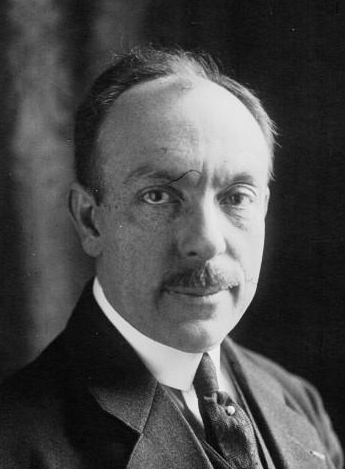
- Born: 21 May 1877
- Died: 14 February 1963 (aged 85)
- Occupations: Writer, humorist, literary critic, painter
- Parents: Charles Ernest Amille (1829–1884) (father); Caroline Reboux (mother)

Paul Reboux (21 May 1877 – 14 February 1963), born André Amillet, was a French writer, humorist, literary critic and painter. He was the son of the journalist Charles Ernest Amillet (1829–1884) and the milliner Caroline Reboux. He later took his mother's maiden name with "Paul" as a pen name, and is usually known as Paul Reboux.

== Life ==
A painter as well as prolific writer, his literary career was diverse, as editor, literary critic, food critic, novelist, and author of natural history books, biographies, travel stories and children's books.

== À la manière de ... ==
Reboux's first publications were pastiches with his friend Charles Müller. Together they published three series of À la manière de ... (In the manner of ...) (1908, 1910 and 1913). Müller died in 1914, and Reboux published a fourth collection in 1925 and a fifth in 1950 on his own, in which his pastiches of Jean-Paul Sartre neighbour with those of Jean Giono, Boris Vian and Henry de Montherlant. These collections gently mock the literary tics of writers such as Octave Mirbeau, Leo Tolstoy, Marcel Proust, Stephane Mallarmé, Gyp, Alphonse Daudet, José Maria de Heredia, Jules Renard, Jean Jaurès, Charles Peguy, Arthur Conan Doyle, Anna de Noailles, and others. They have been reissued until today (the last edition dates from 2003), but some authors considered very obscure today (notably, Gyp) have been eliminated from these reissues.

In the preface to À la manière de ..., in fact writing in the style of the chronicler Georges-Armand Masson, Reboux describes at length the golden rules that preside over the good drafting of a pastiche. This process was also taken up by Jean-Louis Curtis in several of his books, such as Haute École, China Worries Me, and France Exhausts Me.

The Irish-American, Paris-resident composer Swan Hennessy (1866–1929) wrote five volumes of À la manière de ... with music for piano (published 1927–8), which was inspired by the Reboux/Müller series. In these he parodies the styles of a number of historical and contemporary composers.

== Other activities ==
Between 1922 and 1924, Paul Reboux edited an illustrated humour magazine, La Charrette charrie. In 1951, along with Félicien Challaye and Émile Bauchet, he was one of the founders of "La Voie de la paix", organ of the Comité national de resistance à la guerre et à l'oppression (CNRGO; the national committee of resistance to war and oppression, which became the pacifist union of France in 1961).

== Works ==
- À la manière de ... (with Charles Müller)
- Le Paradis des Antilles françaises (1931)
- Le Nouveau savoir-manger
- Le Nouveau savoir-causer
- Le Nouveau savoir-écrire
- Le Nouveau savoir-vivre (1930)
