= Claude Saint-Cyr =

French milliner (1911–2002)

- Claude Saint-Cyr, c. 1950
- Born: 1911; Paris
- Died: 11 September 2002; Montargis, France
- Other names: Claude St-Cyr, Claude St. Cyr, Simone Naudet, Simone Martin
- Occupation: Milliner

For the French general and diplomat, see Claude Carra Saint-Cyr Claude Saint-Cyr – sometimes Claude St-Cyr or Claude St. Cyr – (née Simone Naudet, 1911–2002) was a French milliner who worked in both Paris and London between the 1930s and 1960s, also establishing a worldwide reputation for her hats. She collaborated with many leading designers, including Jean Patou and Norman Hartnell.

She was a key supplier of hats to the royal household from the 1950s on. One of her most notable commissions was the 1960 wedding veil of Princess Margaret; at this event she also made hats for the Queen Mother and the Queen. After closing her own salon, she continued to act as an advisor to other design houses until the mid-1990s.

== Background and early career ==
Simone Naudet was born in 1911 in Paris. The daughter of a casino worker, she began her millinery training at the age of 18, later working with notable Paris designers, including Jean Patou, Marie-Louise Carven and Rose Descat. She spent some time training in London, also changing her professional name to Claude Saint-Cyr. She married the interior designer Georges Martin.

== Establishment of own millinery business ==
Saint-Cyr established her own millinery salon in 1937 in Rue du Faubourg Saint-Honoré, Paris, and this was joined by a shop in London in 1950.

During the 1950s, she gained a reputation as one of the leading milliners of London and Paris. By 1957, her client list comprised many members of the British royal family, notably the Queen, Queen Mother, Princess Margaret and the Duchess of Windsor. Other clients included Queen Soroya of Iran, Begum Om Habibeh Aga Khan, actresses Martine Carol and Eleanor Parker, and many American tourists.

Part of her success in London may have been due to her close working association with the royal household's couturier Norman Hartnell, who chose her to make his hats just before the 1953 coronation. He enabled Saint-Cyr to set up her millinery salon within his London fashion house. The Australian Women's Weekly described Saint-Cyr's association with the royal family and Hartnell in 1960: "She drives to the Palace or Clarence House in Norman Hartnell's Rolls-Royce and etiquette demands that she go hatless". The article added that all her royal customers spoke to their Parisian milliner in French during fittings.

=== Millinery innovations ===
Among the millinery innovations Saint-Cyr is said to have devised, were the oblique hat – in which one side of the brim is angled, enabling decorative details to be placed on the crown. The oblique-brim hat has remained a favoured style for the Queen. She was also among the leading exponents of the 'cocktail hat' that came into vogue during the wartime years – this was typically a confection involving black silk and netting that could be worn with eveningwear. In the 1950s, she helped to revive the fashion for the draped turban producing a supple felt design in 1956 that covered the ears and rose to a peak at the back of the head.

From 1950, Saint-Cyr collaborated with her husband Georges Martin to create a variety of hats and garments that incorporated traditional Aubusson tapestry – an idea inspired after Martin used tapestry to re-cover chairs in Saint-Cyr's salon. She also produced a series of hat designs in collaboration with her husband. The first collection was known as Aubusson and was succeeded by others – in all, over 160 hats were produced over the succeeding four years. For the designs to translate into headgear, particularly fine weaves had to be used and the weavers were taught how to build a hat.

== International success ==
By the mid-1950s, Saint-Cyr's reputation as a milliner was so great that reproductions of her Paris originals were created under licence, alongside those of leading couturiers such as Cristóbal Balenciaga. As well as designing for Norman Hartnell in London, she was producing models for Paris fashion houses such as Dessès. In London, her designs appeared at the fashion shows of the Incorporated Society of London Fashion Designers. At the fashion show for autumn 1959, for example, she showed a line of high-crowned hats – many in velvet – to complement Hartnell's two-colour tweed suits and fur-trimmed and fur-collared coats.

=== Royal weddings ===
Saint-Cyr was chosen to produce headgear for the wedding of Princess Margaret to Antony Armstrong-Jones in May 1960. Not only did she produce the veil worn by Princess Margaret, but also the rose-trimmed and veiled turquoise model worn by the Queen and the cream osprey-feather hat worn by the Queen Mother. Some three years later, Saint-Cyr once again designed hats for the Queen Mother, Queen and Princess Margaret at the wedding of Princess Alexandra and Angus Ogilvy.

== Later career and legacy ==
Saint-Cyr closed her salon in 1964, but began working with French milliner Jean Barthet – a supplier of hats to celebrities such as Princess Grace of Monaco and Maria Callas. This working relationship continued for the succeeding eight years, after which she retired from millinery design but continued to act as a consultant to bridal design houses until the mid-1990s.

Examples of Saint-Cyr's hats are held by a number of museums worldwide, including the Metropolitan Museum of Art in New York. In 2009, her designs were among those featured in the Victoria and Albert Museum's Hats: An Anthology – an exhibition curated by Stephen Jones. In 2013–14, her hats were exhibited in Florence's Pitti Palace, alongside designs by Philip Treacy and Caroline Reboux.

== See also ==
- Philip Treacy, Irish born milliner in London
- Stephen Jones, UK born milliner in London
