= Hatmaking =

Manufacture and design of hats and headwear

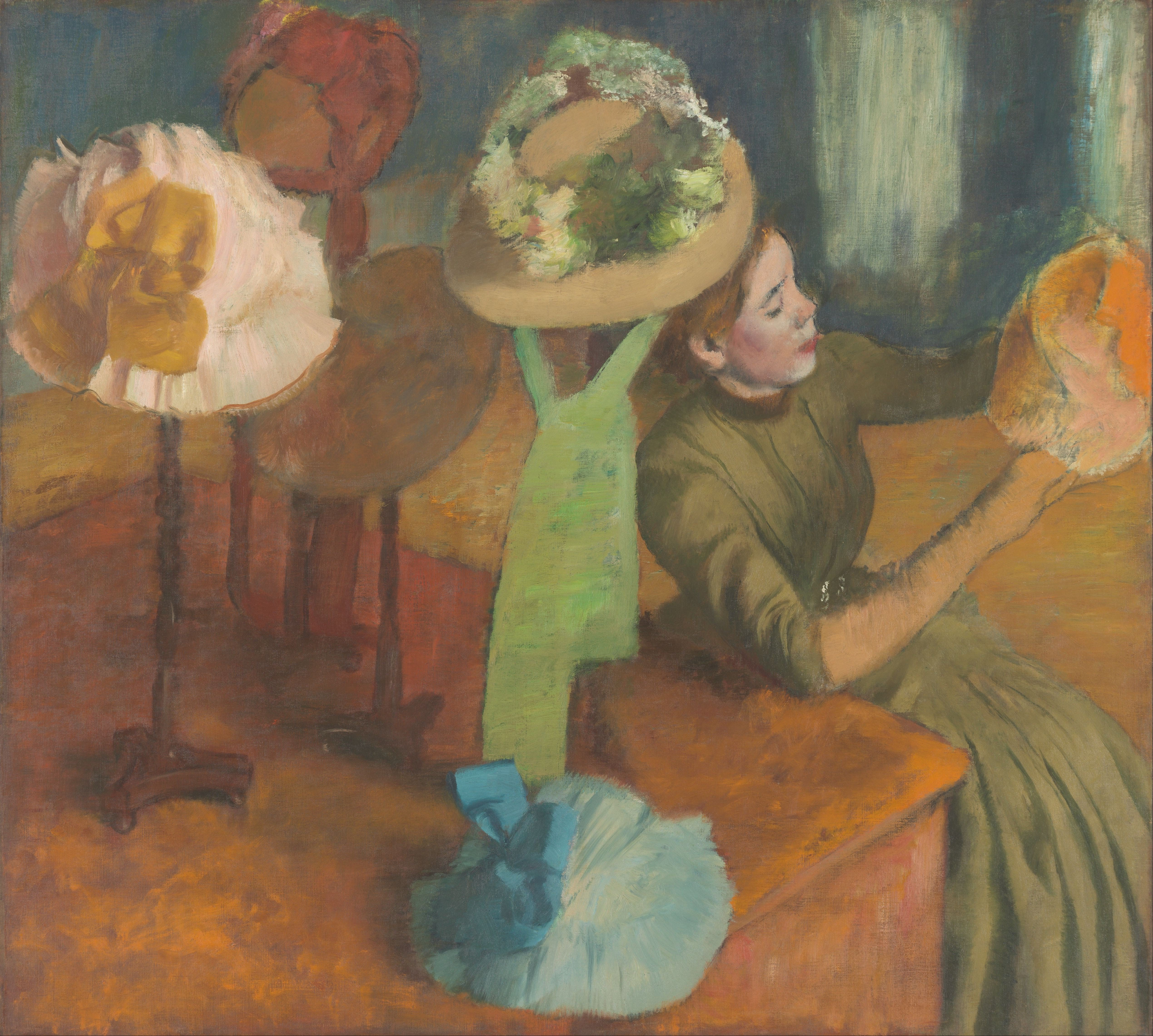
The Millinery Shop by Edgar Degas (1879/86)

Hat-making or millinery is the design, manufacture and sale of hats and other headwear. A person engaged in this trade is called a milliner or hatter.

Historically, milliners made and sold a range of accessories for clothing and hairstyles. In France, milliners are known as marchand(e)s de modes (fashion merchants), rather than being specifically associated with hat-making. In Britain, however, milliners were known to specialize in hats by the beginning of the Victorian period.

The millinery industry benefited from industrialization during the 19th century. In 1889, in London and Paris, over 8,000 women were employed in millinery, and in 1900 in New York, some 83,000 people, mostly women, were employed in millinery. Though the improvements in technology provided benefits to milliners and the whole industry, essential skills, craftsmanship, and creativity are still required. Since hats began to be mass-manufactured and sold as ready-to-wear in department stores, the term "milliner" is usually used to describe a person who applies traditional hand-craftsmanship to design, make, sell or trim hats primarily for a mostly female clientele.

Many prominent fashion designers, including Rose Bertin, Jeanne Lanvin, and Coco Chanel, began as milliners.

== Origin of milliner ==
Hatters, from Das Ständebuch (The Book of Trades), 1568

The term "milliner" or "Milener" originally meant someone from Milan, in northern Italy, in the early 16th century. It referred to Milanese merchants who sold fancy bonnets, gloves, jewellery and cutlery. In the 16th to 18th centuries, the meaning of "milliner" gradually changed in meaning from "a foreign merchant" to "a dealer in small articles relating to dress". Although the term originally applied to men, from 1713 "milliner" gradually came to mean a woman who makes and sells bonnets and other accessories for women.

== Learning of millinery ==
The millinery industry's apprenticeship culture is commonly seen since the 18th century, while milliner was more like a stylist and created hats or bonnets to go with costumes and chose the laces, trims, and accessories to complete an ensemble piece. Millinery apprentices learned hat-making and styling, running the business, and skills to communicate with customers. Nowadays, this apprenticeship is still a standard process for the students who freshly graduated from the millinery schools. Many well-known milliners experienced this stage. For example, Rose Bertin was an apprentice to a successful fashion merchant Mademoiselle Pagelle before her success.

There are many renowned millinery schools located in Europe, especially in London, Paris, and Italy. During COVID-19, many millinery courses were taught virtually.

== Special tools and materials used by milliners ==
A wooden hat block is an intricately carved wood form shaped by skillful woodworkers. Hat blocks are the tools of the trade for milliners in creating a unique hat crown shape. Some of the hat blocks are ensembles with crown and brimmed, while some are only with crown or brim or designed for fascinators. Milliners always have an extensive collection of different hat blocks because there are specific hat sizes and custom shapes for every hat block. In the blocking process of a hat, milliners used push pins and a hammer to hold the adjustable string along the crown's collar and the brim's edge.

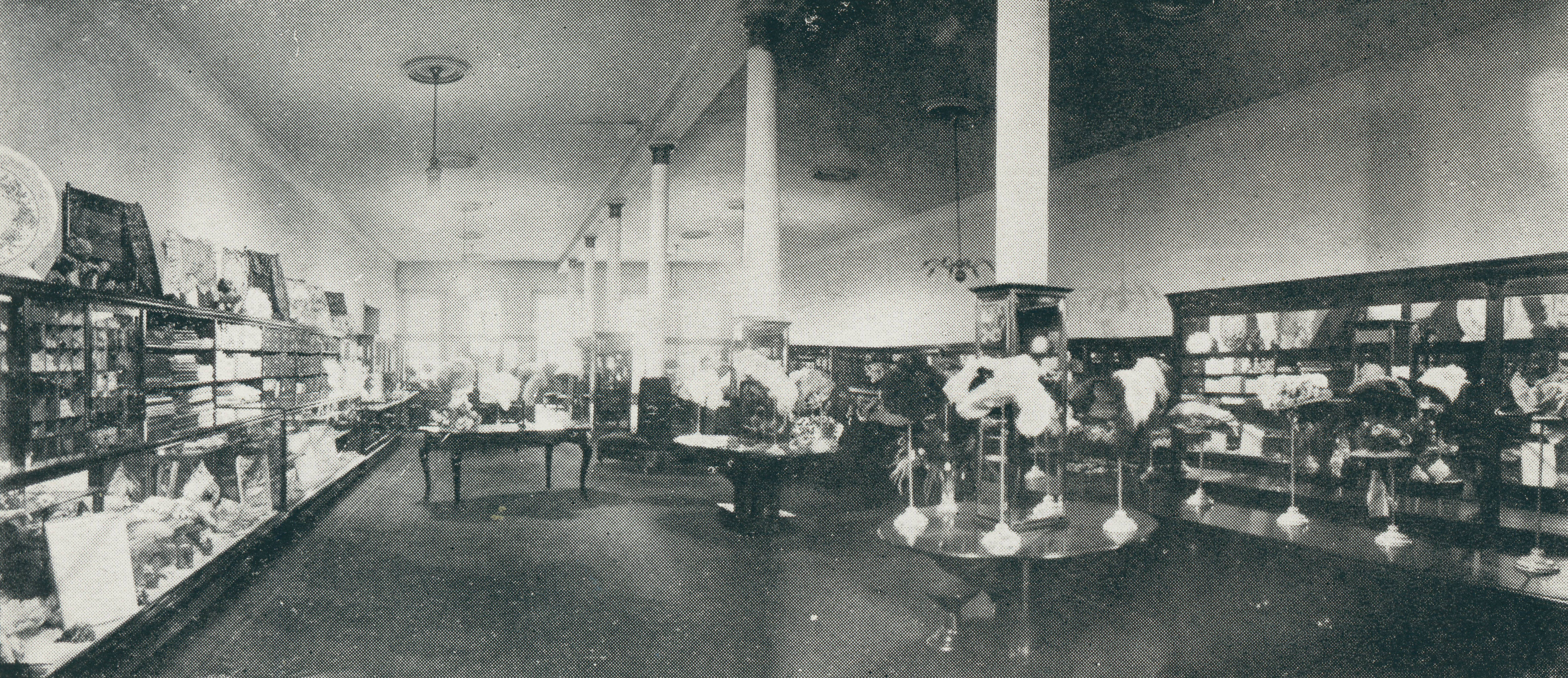
Millinery Department at the Lion Store of Toledo, Ohio, 1900s

A floral-making iron is a unique iron used by milliners to create different floral petals or leaves as the ornament for hat decoration. In the past, candles were used to heat these irons with various shapes of metal in one set. Nowadays, these irons are electric. A ball-shaped metal head is commonly used for the curve of floral pastels.

Milliners often use buckram, a stiff cotton (occasionally linen or horse hair) cloth with a loose weave. Millinery buckram is impregnated with a starch which allows it to be softened in water, pulled over a hat block, and left to dry into a hard shape. Millinery buckram comes in many weights, including lightweight or baby buckram (often used for children's and dolls' hats), single-ply buckram, and double buckram (also known as theatrical buckram or crown buckram).

== "Mad" hatters ==
In 18th- and 19th-century England, mercury was used in the production of felt, which was commonly used in the hat-making trade at the time. Long-term use of mercury products often resulted in mercury poisoning-induced erethism among hat-makers. This is sometimes claimed to be the origin of the phrase "mad as a hatter".

== Notable hatters and milliners ==
This is a partial list of people who have had a significant influence on hat-making and millinery.

=== Hatters ===
- Giuseppe Borsalino, with the famous "Borsalino" Fedora hat
- John Cavanagh, an American hatter whose innovations included manufacturing regular, long and wide-oval fitting hats to enable customers to find better-fitting ready-to-wear hats
- Teofilo Garcia, recognized as a National Living Treasure in the Philippines for pioneering the tabungaw hat, a headwear made from gourd.
- John Genin, an American hatter from New York, famous in the 1850s for his publicity stunts.
- Hawley Products Company, an American manufacturer credited with inventing the tropical shaped, pressed fiber sun helmet used from World War II through the Persian Gulf War
- International Hat Company, an American manufacturer credited with inventing one of America's most popular early 20th century harvest hats for field hands, farmers, and workmen.
- James Lock & Co. of London (founded 1676), is credited with the introduction of the bowler hat in 1849.
- John Batterson Stetson, credited with inventing the classic cowboy hat

=== Milliners ===
- Benny Andallo - 21st-century English avant-garde hat designer
- Kate Bartholomew – American hat designer; created the "Jazz Cap"
- Vanilla Beane – American milliner in Washington, D.C.; served the African American community and notable civil rights activists, among others
- Anna Ben-Yusuf – wrote The Art of Millinery (1909), one of the first reference books on millinery technique
- Rose Bertin – milliner and modiste to Marie Antoinette; often described as the world's first celebrity fashion designer
- Mildred Blount – first African-American milliner to design hats for Hollywood films Gone with the Wind and The Easter Parade; clientele included Joan Crawford, Louise Beavers, Marian Anderson, Gloria Vanderbilt, and other Hollywood stars
- John Boyd – London milliner; known for the pink tricorn hat worn by Diana, Princess of Wales
- Coco Chanel – creator of the Chanel fashion house, and of Chanel No.5 perfume
- Lilly Daché – American milliner of the mid-20th century
- Frederick Fox – Australian-born milliner; noted for his designs for the British royal family
- Akio Hirata – Japanese milliner; collaborated with many Japanese fashion designers, including Yohji Yamamoto and Rei Kawakubo; also created and designed hats for Japanese Empress Michiko since 1966
- Mr. John – American milliner; considered by some to be the millinery equivalent of Christian Dior in the 1940s and 1950s
- Stephen Jones – London milliner; considered one of the world's most radical and important milliners of the late 20th and early 21st centuries
- Nasir Mazhar - 21st-century English hat designer
- Simone Mirman – known for her designs for Elizabeth II and other members of the British royal family
- Barbara Pauli – fashion milliner and modiste in Sweden during the Gustavian era
- Caroline Reboux – milliner of the 19th and early 20th centuries
- David Shilling – milliner, artist and designer, based in Monaco
- Justin Smith – milliner creating bespoke and couture hats under the J Smith Esquire brand
- Gladys Tamez – Mexican-American milliner; Council of Fashion Designers of America member, notable for her work with for Beyoncé's Cowboy Carter, Lady Gaga's Joanne, Taylor Swift's 22 and The Eras Tour, among others, considered to be one of the most influential milliners for western wear and contemporary streetwear
- Philip Treacy – Irish-born milliner; first milliner for eighty years to be invited to exhibit at the Paris haute couture shows, known for work with the British royal family

== See also ==
- Draper
- Haberdasher
- Hat Works
- Mad hatter disease
- Mad as a hatter
- Marchandes de modes
- Walter Wright Hats
