= Caroline Reboux =

French milliner and fashion designer (1840 - 1927)

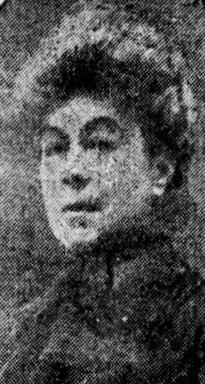
- Reboux in 1901
- Born: c. 1840; Paris, France
- Died: 1927
- Occupation: Milliner
- Known for: Innovations in women's fashion (hats), setting trends in Europe and North America

Caroline Reboux (circa 1840–1927) was a Parisian milliner and French fashion designer. She opened her first boutique at 23 rue de la paix in Paris in 1865, which she continued to operate throughout her life. Reboux opened other shops in Paris and London starting in 1870. She trained other milliners who became famous in their own right, including American milliner Lilly Daché and French milliner Rose Valois. Reboux's most famous shop (opened in 1935) was located at 9 Avenue Matignon in Paris, which carried on operating after her death for almost three decades under the direction of Lucienne Rabaté known as "Mademoiselle Lucienne" the most famous parisian milliner at that time .

Reboux was the first person in fashion design to add a veil to women's hats, also promoting the vogue of colored veils. She created unique hat innovations, updating models such as the large-brimmed straw Gainsborough hats, and she is credited as one of the earliest milliners to introduce the cloche hat in 1914. For over fifty years, from about 1870, she was known as the queen of creative fashion hats and given the nickname "Queen of the Milliners." She was appointed to represent Parisian commerce at the Paris World's Fair of 1900.

== Career ==
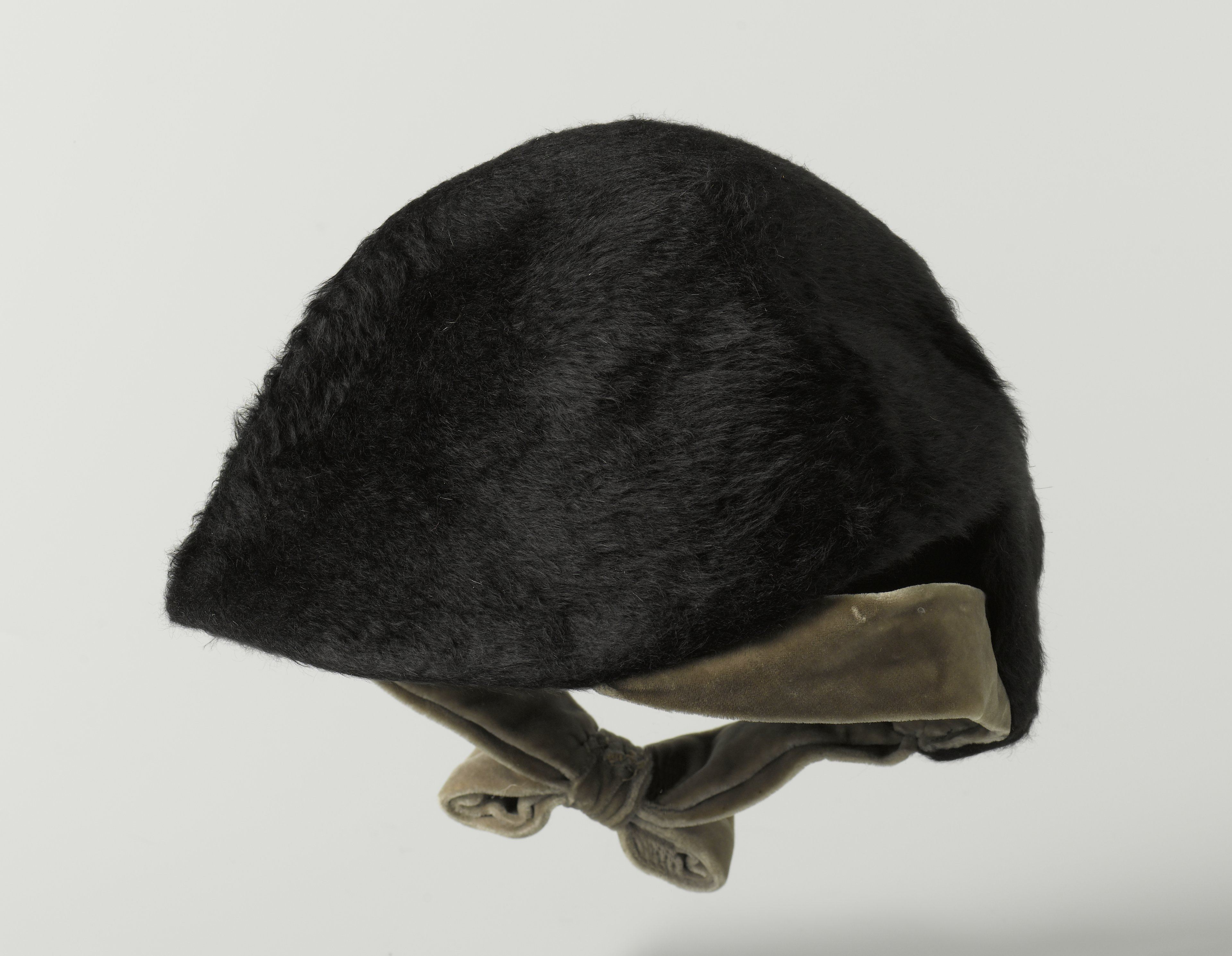
Reboux pointed cap (c. 1949–1953)

Reboux was born circa 1840 and grew up in Paris. Her father was a Parisian journalist named Charles Reboux. Her mother, a Belgian "lady of rank," was the sister of Baron Le Roy Gaussandri, Minister of Public Instruction in Brussels during King Louis Philippe's reign. Reboux got her start by apprenticing with another milliner to learn the trade. The Russian Court patronized her and purchased her hats. Caroline Reboux from then on became known as the Reboux house where ladies of wealth purchased her custom hats.

Reboux creations from the 1860s attracted the attention of Princess Pauline von Metternich and the Empress Eugénie. In 1865, Reboux opened a shop at 9 Avenue Matignon in Paris, where she worked throughout her life. Retaining this shop as her base, she opened other stores in Paris and London. Her most famous address of the late 19th century and early 20th century was located at 23 Rue de la Paix. Reboux made a name for herself in millinery in Europe and the United States and was nicknamed "Queen of the Milliners." The international Red Hat Society says Reboux, being the first important name in millinery, is also closely associated with haute couture, as her hat designs ranked at the same level as that custom fashion.

During the year 1898, Reboux employed 150 women, and she was appointed to represent Parisian commerce at the Paris World's Fair of 1900. A notable business practice of hers was to divide half the profits of her business among the head cashier, the forewoman, the directress of the workroom, and the head manager. She assisted other designers that she had trained to open shops in New York City and other locations. The famous American milliner Lilly Daché trained under Reboux for five years. Rose Valois, an equally successful millinery establishment, was set up in 1927 by Reboux's former employee, Madame Fernand Cleuet, along with Vera Leigh and associates (Rose Valois being the professional pseudonym used by Cleuet). The Rose Valois hat shop was situated at 18 rue Royal in Paris.

For over fifty years, Reboux was known as the queen of creative fashion hats. Her designs were as much sought after as those of fashion designer Charles Frederick Worth, considered the father of haute couture. The international Red Hat Society says Reboux, being the first important name in millinery, is also closely associated with haute couture, as her hat designs ranked at the same level as that custom fashion. She was the first person in fashion design to add a veil to a woman's hat. She also promoted the vogue of colored veils in 1916. Reboux made many fashionable hats for the theater and also did innovative unique models, updating past modes such as the large-brimmed straw hats known as Gainsborough hats. Reboux is often mistakenly credited as the "inventor" of the cloche hat, although millinery historians agree that French milliner Lucy Hamar must share in that credit, as both she and Reboux introduced this style sometime around the year 1914. Reboux is also given credit for designing the iconic, unstructured, felt cloche "helmet" hat that first appeared in the 1920s when Lucienne Rabaté took the direction of the house. Lucienne would create the hat by placing a length of felt on a customer's head and then cutting and folding it to shape, making the brand Reboux was one of the leading exponents of the form.

== Death and legacy ==
Reboux retired in 1922 due to failing health. She died at the age of 87 in 1927. Her business at 23 Rue de la Paix in Paris (originally opened in 1870) continued until 1956 under the direction of Lucienne Rabaté, a longtime associate of the French luxury fashion business Chanel. The continued business of Caroline Reboux was well known for making the felt cloche, which remained "the status symbol of fashion for many years." The boutique was also noted for making hats with profile brims that dipped low on one side, forward-tilt tricorns, open-crown lamé turbans, and flower bandeau hats. Wallis Warfield Simpson, Duchess of Windsor, wore a blue Mainbocher outfit and a halo hat by Reboux for her wedding to the former King of England, Edward VIII at the Château de Candé in 1937. German-born American actress and singer Marlene Dietrich was a faithful customer of Reboux, from whom she bought her trademark berets.

== See also ==
- Madame Virot, milliner
- John Boyd, milliner
- Stephen Jones, milliner
- Claude Saint-Cyr, milliner
- Philip Treacy, milliner
