= Graham Smith (milliner) =

English milliner (born 1938)

- Born: 19 January 1938 (age 88); Bexley, Kent
- Occupation: Milliner

Graham Smith (born 19 January 1938 in Bexley) is a milliner from Kent, England. Beginning his career at a time when hats were an everyday essential for fashionable women, he worked with leading couturiers in Paris and London, later establishing his own brand and also working with mainstream fashion brands such as Kangol.

== Early life and career ==
Smith was educated at Dartford Grammar School before studying at Bromley College of Art (1956–57), and the Royal College of Art (1958–59).

He began his career at the couture house of Lanvin in Paris, working with then head designer Antonio Castillo. Returning to London, he joined the London couturier and Incorporated Society of London Fashion Designers member Michael of Carlos Place, working at the studio for seven years. By 1965, he was appearing under his own name in the fashion press – the launch collection of couturier Clive Evans (known as Clive) in 1965, was described in The Times as featuring a notable hat. by Graham Smith. This had been customised so that it could be worn with 'Space Age' sunglasses.

== Eponymous brand ==
In 1967, Smith established an eponymous fashion label. He soon attracted high-profile clients, including Elizabeth Taylor, Barbra Streisand and Joan Collins. His designs were also showcased in the collections of leading British designers, including Jean Muir and Zandra Rhodes.

While British millinery was in decline from the 1960s on, Smith (alongside Philip Somerville and Frederick Fox) is credited with keeping the craft alive during the 1970s, thanks in part to the tradition of hat-wearing events such as Royal Ascot and the custom of the British royal family.

=== Kangol and other mainstream brands ===
Smith was appointed consultant design director at Kangol in 1981, helping to turn around the company's fortunes during the following decade. Among his most photographed hats of this era was Diana, Princess of Wales' military-style design, worn with a Catherine Walker suit, during a visit to Royal Military Academy Sandhurst in 1987. Kangol's profile rose even more with the rise of the sportswear trend and the kangaroo logo (introduced during Smith's tenure), appeared on bucket hats worn by the likes of Run-DMC and the Beastie Boys.

Smith also produced mainstream lines for BHS during the 1990s.

== Legacy ==
Graham Smith was among the designers featured in a 2009 Victoria and Albert Museum millinery exhibition Hats: An Anthology, curated by Stephen Jones. The hat chosen for the exhibition originally appeared in the 1986 Pirelli Calendar and was donated by Wenda Parkinson.

Smith has helped to train other leading milliners, notably hatmaker to the Queen Rachel Trevor-Morgan.
