= Mushroom hat =

Fashion item

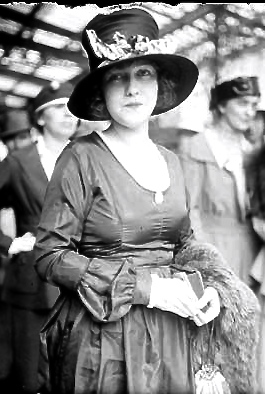
Dorothy Gish sporting a mushroom-brimmed hat in 1918

A mushroom hat (also sometimes referred to as a mushroom brim hat or dish hat) is a millinery style in which the brim of the hat tilts downwards, resembling the shape of a mushroom (or dish). It is a style that first emerged in the 1870s and 1880s, when it was usually made of straw. It became fashionable again from around 1907 to the late 1920s; these versions featured a distinctly downturned brim although the size and shape of the crown varied according to prevailing fashions.

A new and exaggerated version of the mushroom hat was popularised by Christian Dior in 1947 as part of his "New Look" collection. This style generally had a minimal crown and a very wide brim, with some models resembling a flying saucer.

== History of the design ==
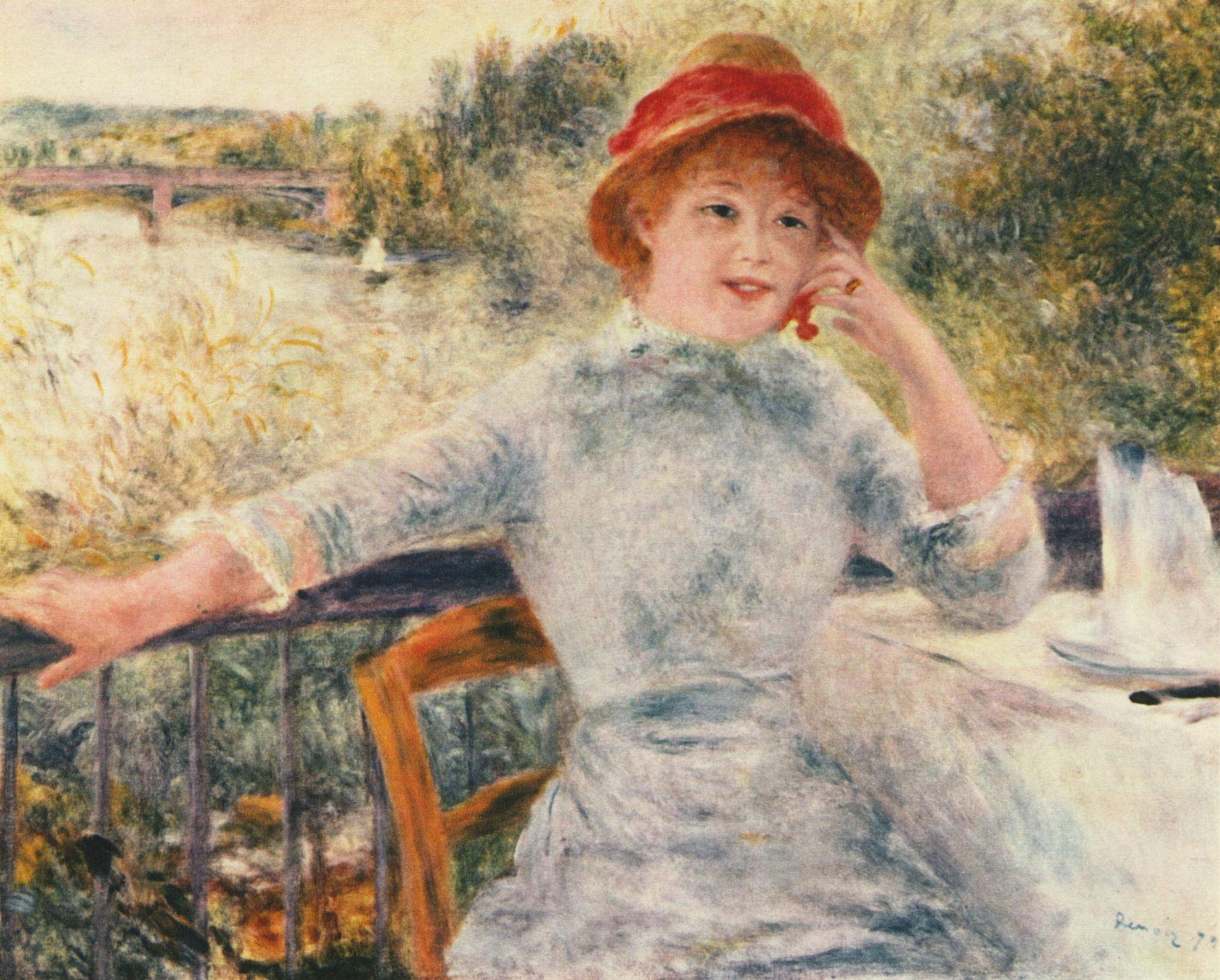
Early mushroom hats were of straw. Portrait by Pierre-Auguste Renoir, 1879

The defining characteristic of mushroom hats is their downturned brim, resembling a mushroom or toadstool. In the 1870s, designs in straw shaped like a mushroom became popular. These had a small crown trimmed with ribbons, flowers and – in the 1880s – bird decorations.

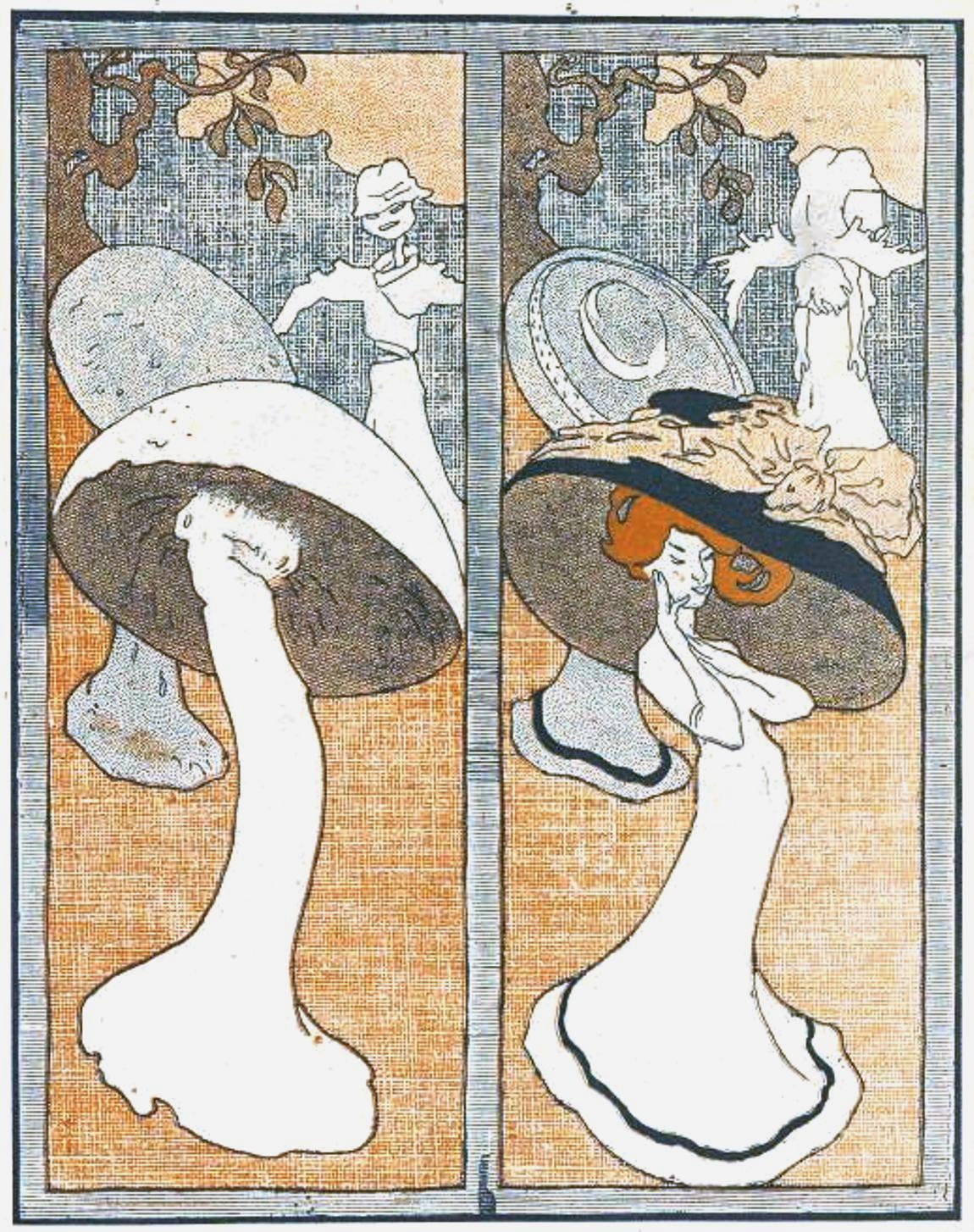
A 1908 cartoon by Ion Theodorescu-Sion satirising the popularity of mushroom hats

In 1907, mushroom hats in both straw and felt became popular. Such was their ubiquity that Evelyn Sharp lambasted them in an editorial in The Guardian, writing: "For about six months have we endured the sight of mushroom shapes in every kind of straw trimmed with a fringed silk scarf. I suppose there was some attraction in the mushroom hat when it was first designed, and I can still see its charms when it is very small and very flexible....worn by somebody in a motor car. But this autumnal growth of felt fungi deserves nothing but condemnation". Her words fell on deaf ears as the popularity of mushroom shapes persisted. In 1909, a full-page advertisement in The Times describing Selfridge & Co's millinery choices detailed a mushroom brim hat decorated with ostrich feathers. In the same year, Dickins & Jones offered a: "becoming mushroom hat...trimmed with wide Velvet Ribbon and a Large Posy of Flowers at side". By 1915, variations on the design for younger girls included almost brimless mushroom models – similar to a cloche or bucket hat.

=== 1920s variations ===
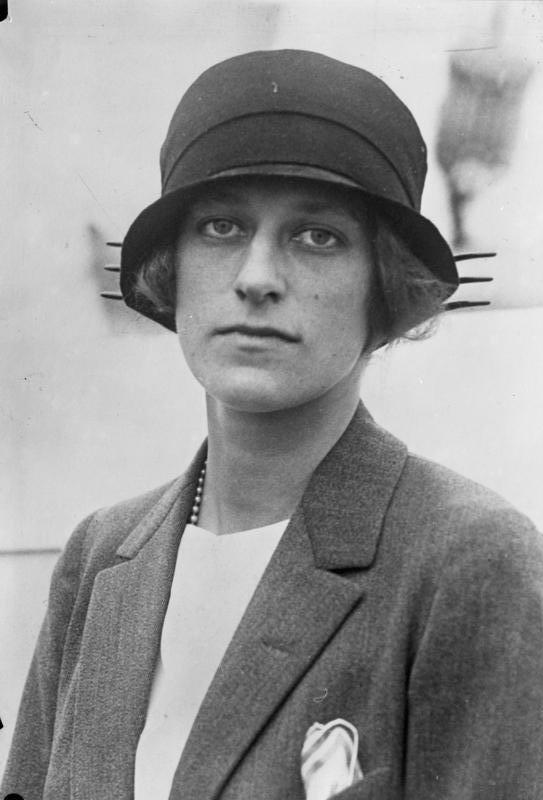
1920s mushroom hats often resembled the cloche hat, but with the addition of a neat brim, such as this model worn by Isabel Rockefeller

The mushroom hat was fashionable throughout the 1920s, with Princess Mary choosing a mushroom shape with a blue lace-covered brim for the opening day of Ascot in 1920. Five years later, the Duchess of York chose a mushroom design trimmed with vivid orange osprey feathers tucked at either side of the brim for Ascot's Ladies' Day race meeting.

It was a style that could incorporate the fashions for snug-fitting cloche-like designs or taller crowned hats. A fashion editorial of 1921 noted the value of wider-brimmed models: "Plentiful sunshine has served to emphasize the advantages of a mushroom hat, which with its adequate protection often makes a sunshade unnecessary". In the same year, velvet for babies were described as among the newest children's millinery. The hat design lent itself to ornate decorations with ribbon and feather trims and veils. It could also be made in a variety of materials, from straw for summer to felt or stiffened silk for winter; in 1925, Harvey Nichols offered a selection of mushroom hats for the autumn season in the latest velour fabric.

== 1940s "New Look" adaptation ==
A new variety of mushroom hat (also known as the dish hat) appeared at Dior's first fashion show on 12 February 1947. The hat balanced the neat jacket with nipped-in waist and full tulle-lined skirt, heralding a new lavishness in fabric and silhouette – what editor of American Harper's Bazaar Carmel Snow described at first viewing as a "new look".

By 1956, the fashion for new shapes meant a huge variety of options, as noted by The Guardian's fashion correspondent Phyllis Heathcote: "Flower-pots, sugar-loaves, mushrooms, melons, muffins – all these have inspired Paris milliners this season". Of the mushroom look, she added: "This may be small and snugly rounded, like the little pink 'Champignon de Paris' (Chabeau makes one of these in fine straw with a goffered frill of organdy under the brim that somehow carries the model away back to the source of its inspiration)...or it is wide and gently curving at the brim like the larger and flatter field variety. On these wider shapes go flat the airier techniques that the spring hat demands. Laizes of all kinds; fine picot straws, satin straws, gros-grain, short-pile summer velvet, raffia, coarse tulle, jersey, printed taffeta, crin, organdy, chiffon, and a great many flowers". Other names for the variations that emerged include the mushroom cloche, a diminutive version of Dior's oversized dish.

Wide-brimmed mushroom hats continued to be popular throughout the 1950s and early '60s, with other designers incorporating the wide hat profile. Adaptations included Balmain's spring 1955 side-swept mushroom hat – a design in which the downward-curved brim of the hat dipped low on one side of the face and was tilted upwards on the other, forming an almost triangular profile.

In 1959, The Observer reported that mushroom hats were big news at Ascot for milliners such as Rose Vernier: "The majority of her clients wanted big tulle mushrooms, but the younger girls asked for the youthful tailored shapes of medium size – when they were not demanding outsize Gigi bretons".

In 1963, Balenciaga included extreme saucer-shaped versions of the design in velvet, worn with a tapered raglan-sleeved black wool crepe dress and lime yellow twill coat with pleated shoulder. By 1964, a more bucket-shaped line had re-emerged. Ricci showed a high-crowned white mushroom hat worn with a double-breasted gaberdine suit in the spring shows.

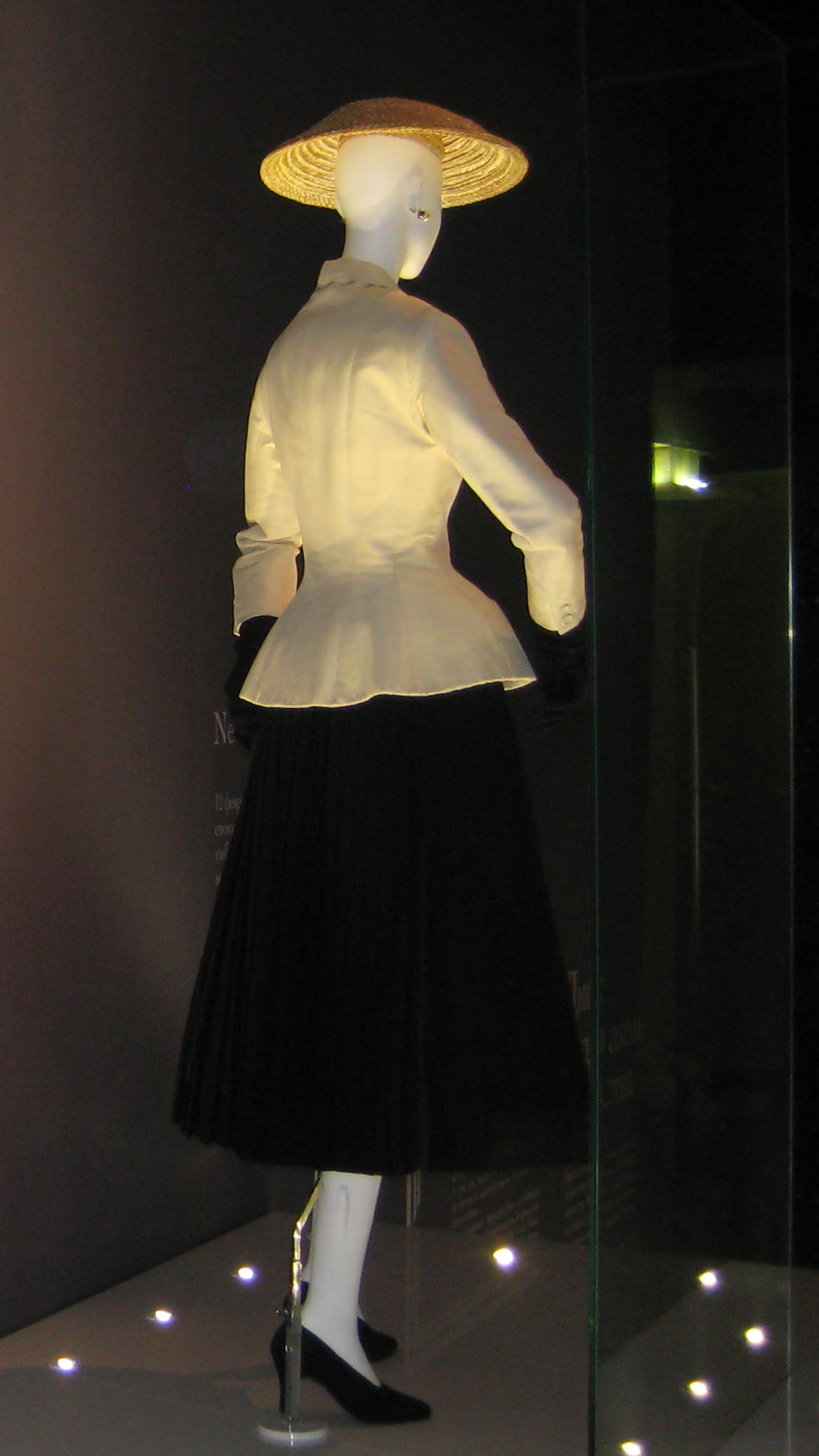
Dior mushroom hat, with "New Look" outfit from 1947 – displayed in Moscow at a 2011 exhibition

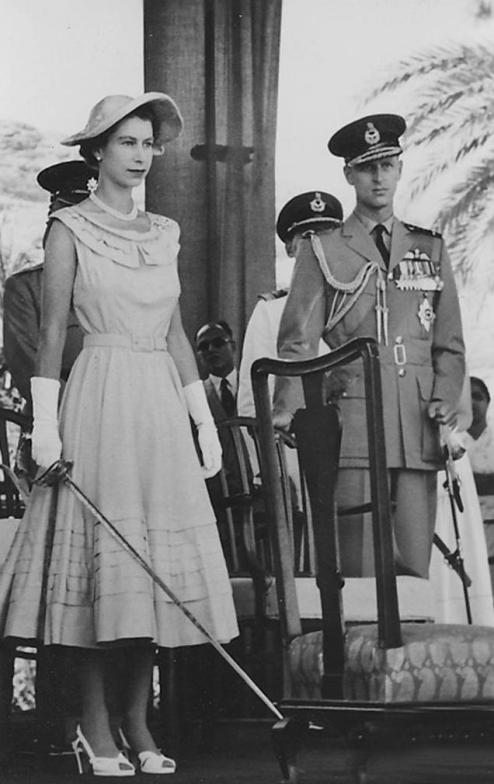
Queen Elizabeth in an adapted mushroom design in Aden, 1954

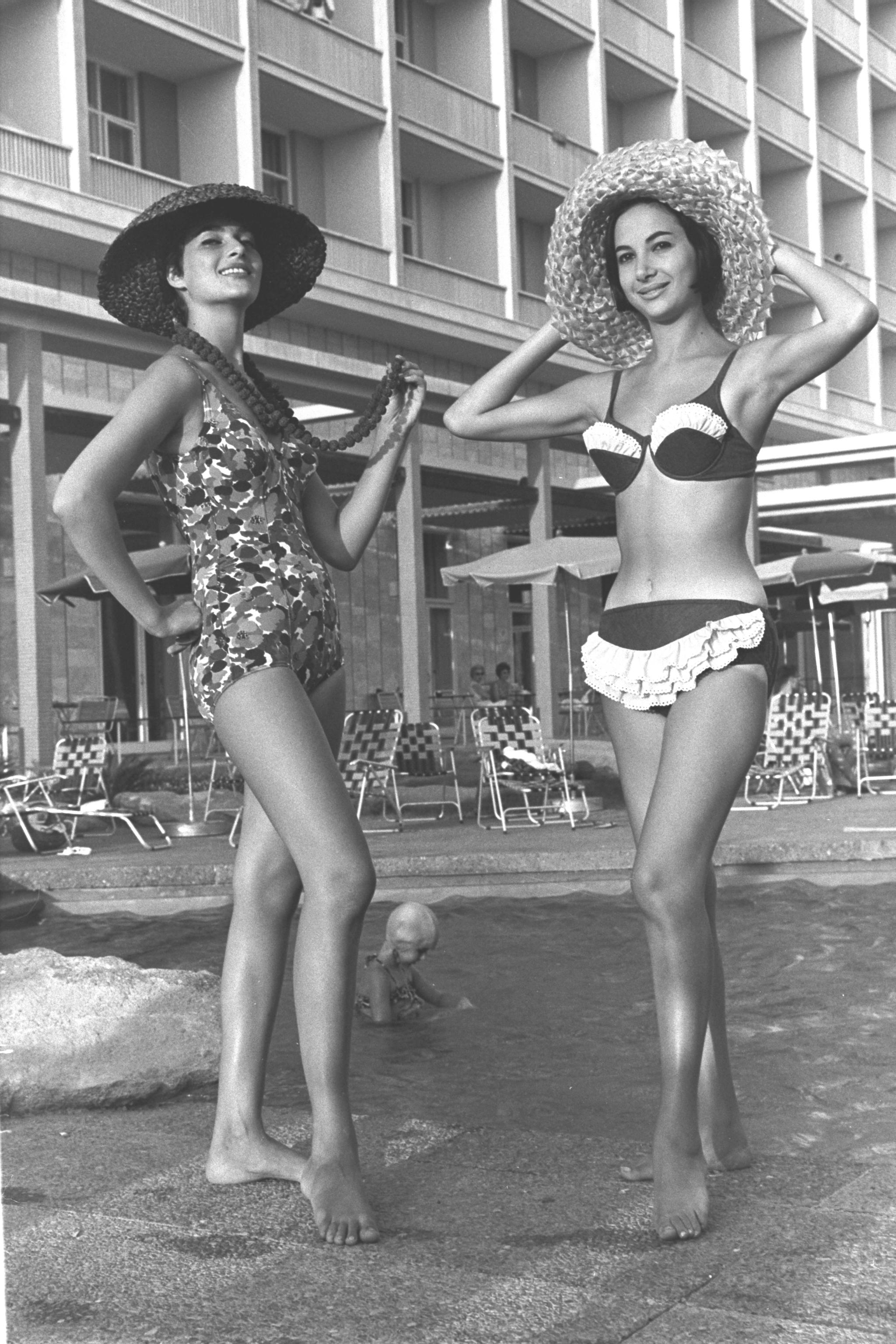
Mushroom hat photographed in 1961

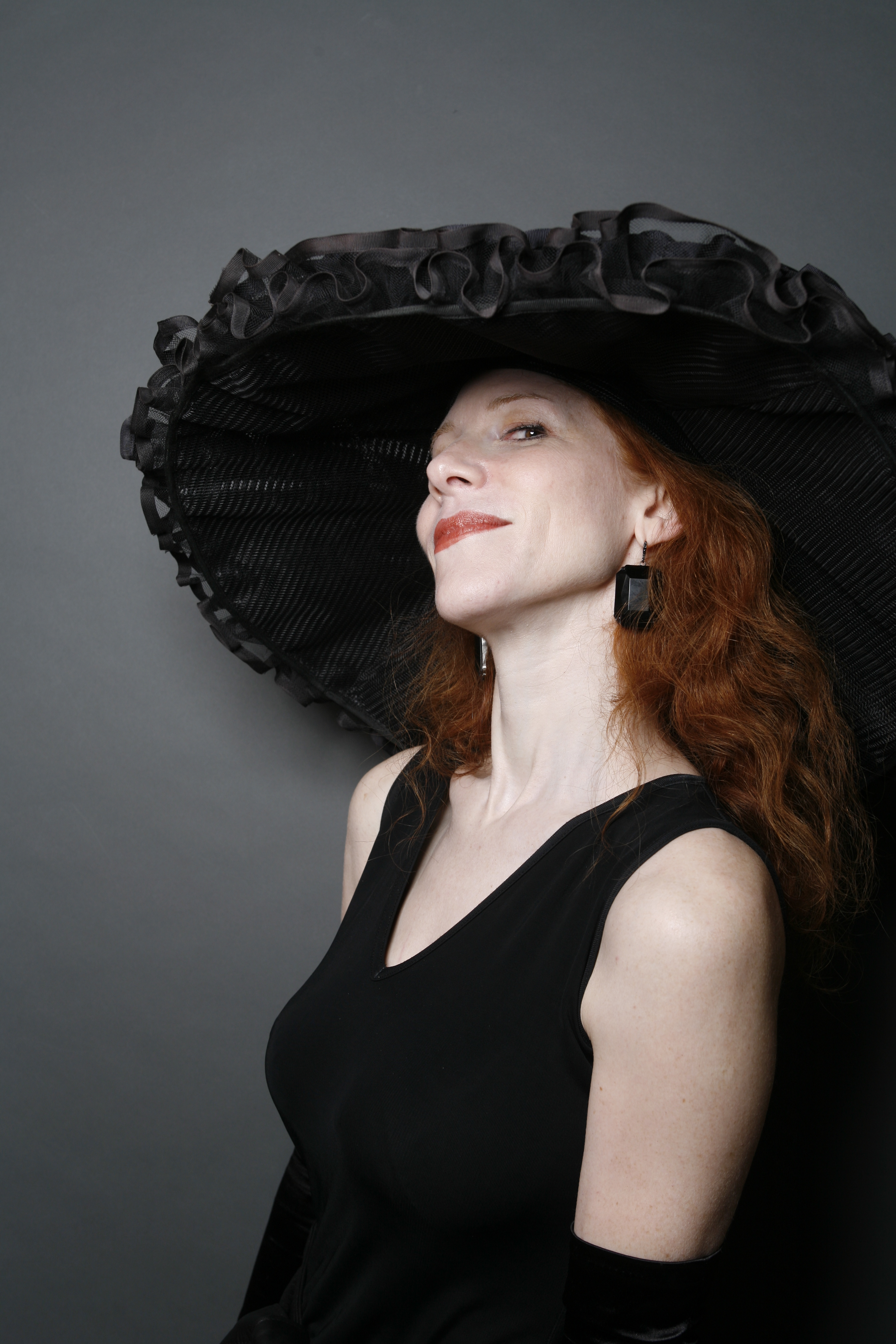
Amy Alkon in oversized black mushroom-brim design by milliner Amy Downs, 2009

=== Revivals ===
The mushroom shape has had a number of revivals in high fashion. During the mid 1980s, Frederick Fox created a much-photographed mushroom-style design for Diana, Princess of Wales – worn tilted and known as the 'flying saucer'. More recently, Stephen Jones designed oversized hats in fur – including mushroom-like designs – for the fall/winter 2012 Marc Jacobs' show at New York Fashion Week.

== See also ==
- List of hat styles
- Cartwheel hat
- Cloche hat
- Lampshade hat
