= Rachel Trevor-Morgan =

British milliner

- Born: Stourbridge
- Occupation: Milliner
- Notable credit: Royal Warrant to Queen Elizabeth II from 2014 until the death of Queen Elizabeth II on 8 September 2022.

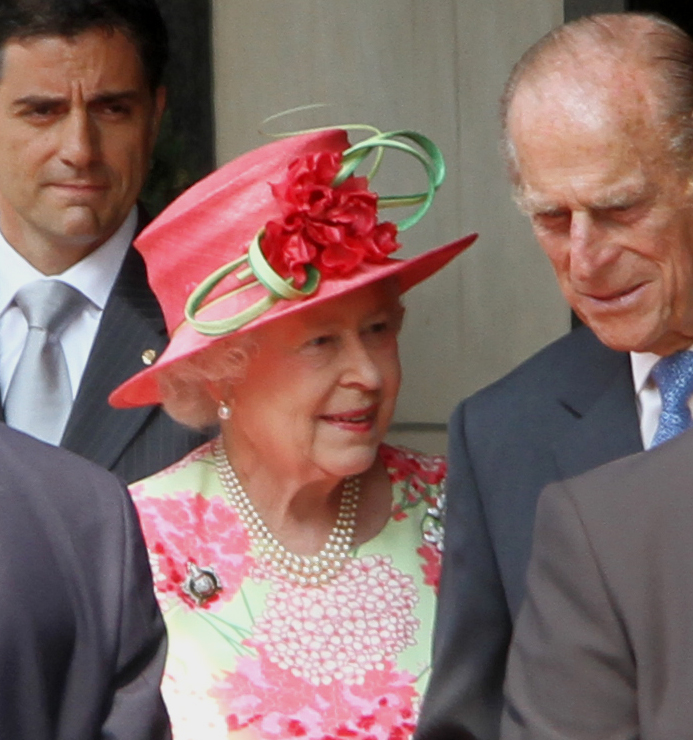
The Queen wore a Rachel Trevor-Morgan hat during a 2010 visit to Toronto

Rachel Trevor-Morgan is a British milliner best known for the hats she created for the Queen Elizabeth II.

In 2014, she was granted a Royal Warrant by the Queen.

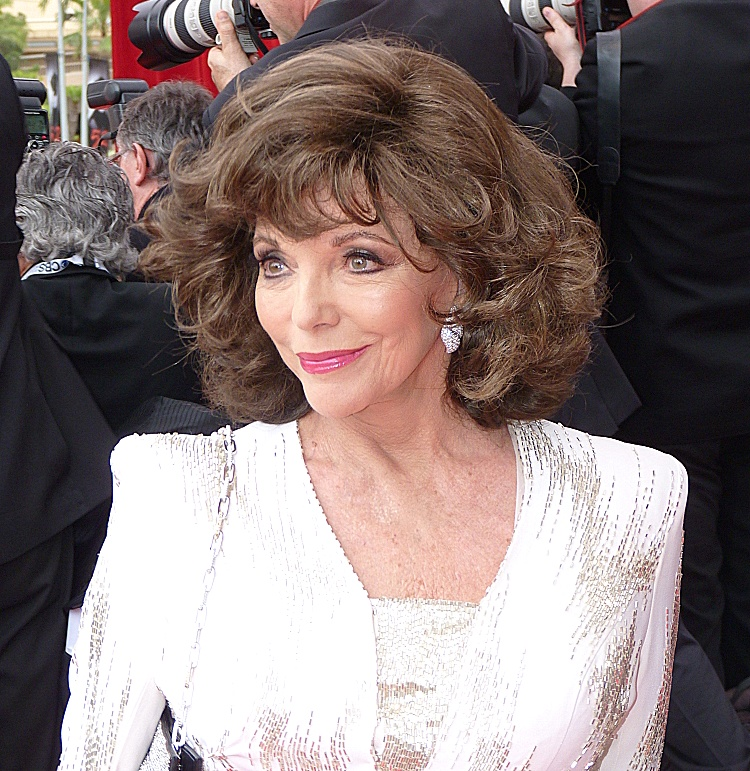
Dame Joan Collins is among Morgan’s clientele

== Early life and career ==
The hat designer Rachel Trevor-Morgan was born in Stourbridge, West Midlands. Her father was a vicar and, as a child, she loved seeing her mother wear hats to church. She was a pupil at The Alice Ottley School in Worcester and, aged 19, moved to London intent on learning how to be a milliner.

She wrote to British milliner Graham Smith – hatmaker to Elizabeth Taylor, Joan Collins and Princess Diana among others – asking if she could see how he worked. He interviewed Trevor-Morgan and offered her an apprenticeship. She learned the trade for three years, as one of a workroom of 14 women in his studio near Oxford Street, then working for another royal hat designer Philip Somerville between 1988 and 1990. Trevor-Morgan has said of her training with two of London's most celebrated milliners that Graham Smith taught her how to get the hat right and Philip Somerville taught her about "people relations". She has also described Smith as remaining her "mentor" when she needs advice.

== Eponymous label ==
Trevor-Morgan set up in business in 1990, initially selling her designs in the market at St Martin-in-the-Fields Church. Soon she was supplying Fortnum & Mason; Harrods and Selfridges followed and, in 1992, her business moved to a 17th-century studio in the prestige location of St James's. By 1998, her reputation had grown to the extent that a feature in The Times included her in a list of go-to milliners in London, alongside much more established names such as Frederick Fox and Stephen Jones.

=== Royal commissions ===
Trevor-Morgan began making hats for the Queen in 2006 – initially she was invited to create six sketches for review and then some designs were made. The first of her models was worn by the Queen at her 80th birthday church service at St Paul's Cathedral. The Queen then chose another of the designer's hats – a beige shot silk model – for her birthday lunch at the Mansion House – inspiring a Times journalist to note that Trevor-Morgan had now become "a new recruit to a tight little band of royal headwear designers".

From 2006, she had been one of the Queen's preferred milliners, creating some 60 hats (averaging ten a year) up to 2012. In 2014, Trevor-Morgan was awarded a Royal Warrant.

Trevor-Morgan worked closely with the Queen's design team, including fashion designer Stewart Parvin and the Queen's senior dresser and assistant Angela Kelly. More recently, Trevor-Morgan hats have also been worn by other members of the British Royal Family, including Catherine, Duchess of Cambridge.

== Other commissions ==
Trevor-Morgan still supplies London stores such as Fortnum & Mason as well as creating hats for private clients. All designs are bespoke, with fabric and straw dyed in the St James's studio. Trevor-Morgan has said she prepares her dyes in a saucepan, cooking them up to achieve exactly the right shade.

In 2014, she was commissioned to add miniature hats to Lego figures in front of a replica of Buckingham Palace at Legoland in Windsor in the run up to Royal Ascot.
