= Otto Lucas =

German-born milliner based in London (1903–1971)

- Lucas in 1952
- Born: 9 July 1903; Germany
- Died: 2 October 1971 (aged 67–68); Aarsele, Belgium
- Occupation: Milliner

Otto Lucas (9 July 1903 – 2 October 1971) was a German-born, London based milliner. Running a hugely successful hatmaking studio in London between the 1930s and the 1970s, his business supplied both major stores throughout Europe, the US and Australia and hats for private clients such as Greta Garbo and Wallis Simpson. His career was cut short when he was killed in a plane crash over Belgium in October 1971.

== Life and career ==
Otto Lucas was born in Germany and, after a spell learning millinery in Paris and Berlin, he moved to London and opened his own salon in Bond Street, Mayfair in 1932. By the 1950s, Lucas was supplying other fashion designers, stores and private clients – notably Wallis Simpson and Greta Garbo.

Lucas was a skilled businessman and his workroom grew to immense proportions; a 1958 British Pathé film Heady Stuff – featuring a walk on role for top model Barbara Goalen – shows a small army of women working in the back of his Bond Street salon. He worked closely with members of the Incorporated Society of London Fashion Designers (IncSoc). For example, in 1953, he supplied all the hats for a fashion show in St Moritz organised by export magazine The Ambassador to showcase designs by, among others, Norman Hartnell, Digby Morton and Victor Stiebel. Similarly, in 1961, he supplied all the hats worn by some 250 models at the fifth London Fashion Week organised by the Fashion House Group of London, which represented a variety of fashion, textiles and accessories brands. He mixed in artistic circles and one of his best friends was The Colony Room proprietor Muriel Belcher – who never wore a hat.

Lucas's salon also supplied major department stores, such as Fortnum & Mason in London. He began exporting to David Jones in Australia in 1934 and was still supplying them in the 1950s; new shipments of his hats were heavily promoted. He also produced hats for the US, available in stores such as Saks Fifth Avenue. Lucas continued to deliver a huge number of hats throughout the 1960s and into the 1970s. In his final year of work, his studio is said to have made and delivered over 55,000 designs.

== Death ==
Lucas was a passenger on BEA Flight 706, which crashed near Aarsele, Belgium on 2 October 1971 en route to Salzburg, Austria. There were no survivors among the 63 passengers and crew.

== Legacy and commemoration ==
Lucas was responsible for training many future milliners – notably leading hatmakers to the Queen, Frederick Fox and Philip Somerville, both of whom completed apprenticeships at his studio. His hats can be found in, among others, the archives of the Victoria & Albert Museum, London, and the Powerhouse Museum, Sydney.

One of his hats – a scarlet toque – is immortalised in the Norman Parkinson fashion portrait After Van Dongen, which originally appeared in Vogue in 1959. A different frame from this shoot was then chosen by Parkinson for the cover of the publication accompanying his 1981 solo portrait exhibition at the National Portrait Gallery.

Lucas was featured in the New York Times Overlooked No More series in June 2024.
