= British European Airways Flight 706 =

1971 aviation accident in Belgium

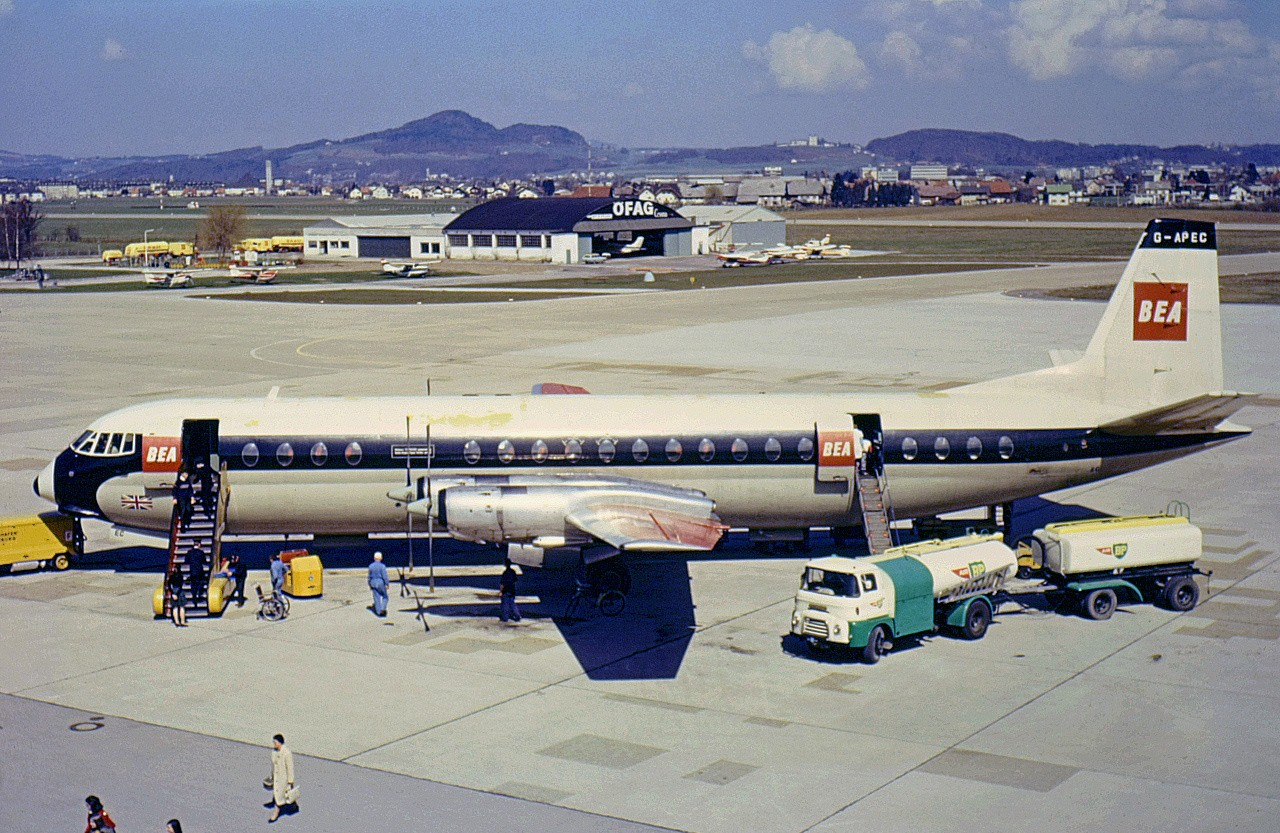
- G-APEC, the aircraft involved in the accident

Accident
- Date: 2 October 1971
- Summary: Explosive decompression, leading to structural failure and loss of control
- Site: Aarsele, Belgium; 50°59′32″N 3°26′26″E
- Total fatalities: 63
- Total injuries: 1

Aircraft
- Aircraft type: Vickers Vanguard
- Operator: British European Airways
- Registration: G-APEC
- Flight origin: Heathrow Airport, London, UK
- Destination: Salzburg Airport, Austria
- Occupants: 63
- Passengers: 55
- Crew: 8
- Fatalities: 63
- Survivors: 0

Ground casualties
- Ground injuries: 1

British European Airways Flight 706 (BE706/BEA706) was a scheduled international passenger flight from London, England to Salzburg, Austria. On 2 October 1971, whilst en route at 19,000 feet (5,791 m), the pressure bulkhead of the Vickers Vanguard at the rear of the cabin failed. The resulting depressurisation of the tail section caused the surfaces of the tailplanes to separate. The aircraft entered an uncontrollable dive and crashed near Aarsele, Belgium, killing all 63 passengers and crew on impact. A piece of debris from the aircraft struck a passing car, causing minor injuries to one of its occupants.

The British AAIB concluded that the failure of the rear pressure bulkhead had been caused by undetected corrosion located at the rear of the aircraft. The corrosion could not be noticed by crew due to the inspection technique that had been applied by BEA. Numerous pressurization cycles caused the crack to grow, weakening the rear pressure bulkhead until the structure was unable to withstand further repeated stress.

== Aircraft ==
The aircraft involved in the crash was a Vickers Vanguard type 951, registered in United Kingdom as G-APEC. The aircraft was built in 1959 with a serial number of 706, and was delivered to BEA in 1961.

== Flight ==
Flight 706 took off from Runway 28L (now 27L) of London Heathrow Airport at 09:34 local time with 55 passengers and 8 crew members. After take off, Flight 706 was routed via Epsom, Biggin and Detling in accordance to the "Dover One" standard instrument departure clearance. The crew of Flight 706 later reported over the Dover VOR at 09:54 local time. At the time, Flight 706 was climbing through 14,200 feet (4,328 m). At 10:01, the communication was handed over to Brussels Air Traffic Control.

- 10:01 BEA706: "Goodmorning Brussels Bealine seven oh six is passing one eight for one nine zero and estimating Wulpen at zero hour"
- 10:01 ATC: "Seven oh six cleared er Salzburg green one to maintain flight level one nine zero on reaching "
- 10:01 BEA706: "Bealine seven oh six"

The crew then reported passing over the Wulpen VOR with the aircraft level at FL190 (about 19,000 feet (5,791 m).

- 10:05 BEA706: "Brussels Bealine seven oh six checked Wulpen zero four we're now level one nine zero estimating Mackel one zero"
- 10:05 ATC: "Seven oh six roger"

Five minutes after this transmission, the crew of Flight 706 transmitted "we're going down, seven oh six, we are going down" to Brussels Tower. The crew later declared emergency and called "mayday, mayday" several times. The crew also stated the phrase "out of control" several times. At one point, they stated that there was no rudder control. Their calls were accompanied by several background voices.

- 10:09:46 BEA706: "We're going down, seven oh six, we're going down Mayday Mayday Mayday"
- 10:09 BEA706: "Mayday Mayday Mayday we're going down vertically"
- 10:09:55 BEA706: "Bealine seven zero six (inaudible) out of control"
- 10:09:58 BEA706: "No rudder-- (inaudible)"
- 10:10:11 BEA706: "AAH! This is it--"

The last transmission from Flight 706 was recorded at 10:10:30. Brussels Tower immediately attempted contacting Flight 706 several times. However, there were no answers from Flight 706. Witnesses on the ground saw the tailplane of Flight 706 detached and subsequently it entered a nose-dive. The flight kept diving and crashed into farmland near Aarsele, Belgium and exploded on impact. All 55 passengers and 8 crew members were killed. At least one person on the ground was injured after pieces of debris struck a passing car.

Rescue services were immediately dispatched. Investigators were deployed and searched for the aircraft's black box. A crisis center was set up in Salzburg for the relatives of the victims of Flight 706. Searchers stated that most of the bodies were not intact. One searcher said "as for the bodies, what we have found so far is barely enough to reconstitute one body."

== Passengers and crews ==
The aircraft was carrying 55 passengers and 8 crew. News reports stated that there were 37 British passengers. At least 4 Japanese and 11 Americans were also on board. Further reports confirmed the presence of 8 Austrians. Three notable fatalities among the passengers were the British hat designer Otto Lucas, the Austrian-born chemist Albert Wassermann, and an Austrian academic, René Marcic.

The Captain was identified as 40 year old Captain E.T Probert. At the time of the accident, he had accumulated total flying hours of 9,260, in which 1,927 hours were on the type. The co-pilot was 38 year old J.M Davies, who held a Vickers Vanguard rating. He had total flying hours of 3,386, in which 764 hours were on the type. The aircraft was carrying a third pilot, identified as 27 year old B.J.S Barnes with total flying hours of 2,237, in which 1,903 hours were on the type and a supernumerary, identified as Captain G. Partridge.

== Investigation ==
Witnesses on the ground recalled that the Vanguard suddenly exploded in mid-air, lost one of its wings, and plunged onto the ground, with smoke pouring out from one of its wings. They stated that they heard strange noises during the crash. According to them, the aircraft touched down in one field, jumped a road, and plowed through grassland for 500 yards (1,500 ft; 460 m). It gouged the ground and burst into flames in a pit 15 feet (4.6 m) deep. One of the witness stated, "The fire spread from the wreckage like waves." Police said eyewitness reports indicated that Captain Probert had tried to execute an emergency landing.

There was considerable suspicion that the aircraft had been sabotaged by extremists. A BEA spokesman claimed that the aircraft was sabotaged by Northern Ireland extremists. The Vanguard had been used on the London-Belfast route, though he said the aircraft had not been on Belfast service for at least 48 hours and was stored in Edinburgh on Friday. However, after a preliminary investigation by William Trench, one of the investigators from AIB, stated that at the time there was no hint that sabotage played a part in the crash.

=== Structural failure ===
Observation of the aircraft's wreckage revealed that about two thirds of the tail and the left elevator had already detached from the aircraft prior to its impact with the ground, indicating a structural breakup. These parts were found trailing before the crash site and major portions of the parts were recovered several kilometres away from the main wreckage area. By taking the prevailing wind drift into account, the result of the drift plot indicated that the components had separated from the aircraft at a height of approximately 18,000 feet (5,500 m). The hypothesis was also supported by recordings from the flight recorder and the transcript of conversation between the flight crew and the controller in Brussels. The flight data recorder was abruptly cut off while the aircraft was flying on cruising altitude, while in the ATC recording the crew could be heard stating that they were going down vertically with no rudder control.

The examination on the recovered parts revealed that both the left and right horizontal stabilizer and the elevator had detached in a near similar manner. The nature of the separation sparked strong suspicion that the separation had been caused from the inside of the aircraft rather than from external environment. The upper skin of the tail had been blown outwards, strongly suggesting that difference in internal pressure from the aircraft had caused the separation of the components.

Reconstruction on the aircraft wreckage indicated that the rear pressure bulkhead had suffered corrosion at the lower part of the bulkhead. Beneath the double curvature peripheral doubler plate, the bulkhead material had corroded and the bond between materials had decreased. At the end of each corroded area, a tear could be seen spreading upwards and outwards to a rivet line which was located at the lower edge of the bulkhead. The tear on the left side was particularly noted for the "step" marks. The marks ran for at least 60 centimetres (24 in) and the distance of each "steps" progressively increased.

A simulation with similar scenario was conducted by AAIB. A UV tracer was used in the simulation to show the movement of the tear. The right horizontal stabilizer was taken from another aircraft of similar age and flying time with the involved aircraft. Differential pressure was introduced during the simulation. During the test, the bulkhead failed, creating a burst of force that blew the skin of the tail outwards. The force was violent enough that a rivet line managed to blow through the skin of the elevator hinge. The right horizontal stabilizer and the elevator were severely damaged by the explosion. Comparison between the pattern that had been created by the explosion in the simulation showed that the pattern was similar with the pattern that was found in the wreckage.

The result clearly showed that corrosion within the rear pressure bulkhead had caused the component to fail inflight, resulting in an explosion that caused the rapid separation of the horizontal stabilizers and the vertical stabilizer. The loss of the aircraft parts caused the aerodynamic forces to be compromised, causing the crew to lose control of the aircraft.

=== Cause of failure ===
From the extent and severity of the corrosion, it was deemed likely that the corrosion had taken a long period of time to develop, although investigators could not determine how much time had been needed for such corrosion to develop. Due to the radiographic technique that had been applied by BEA, the crack on the aircraft couldn't be detected in a timely manner as the radiographic data could not be properly interpreted. Eventually, the crack continued to grow due to repeated pressurization until it became visible from the outside. This was corroborated by evidence of nicotine stain and signs of spilt sewage around the corroded area.

Though the cracks were visible from the outside, the aircraft visual inspection was not regularly conducted by staff. The inspection was instead conducted at long intervals, causing the corrosion attack to intensify. After numerous times of flying, a considerable amount of sewage fluid had been retained on the corroded area, creating visible stain. The area with the stain was always cleaned before an inspection. This practice caused the aircraft inspector to not notice any corrosion and possible fluid leakage in the area.

=== Conclusion ===
Investigators finally concluded the cause of the accident, and stated,

"The accident was caused by the rupture of the rear pressure bulkhead, which led to the separation of both tailplanes in flight and in turn caused the aircraft to dive into the ground,"

== Aftermath ==
British European Airways immediately implemented a new technique in detecting corrosion. It was later revealed that eight Vanguards of their fleets suffered the same crack as G-APEC.

After the release of the final report, a new technique to detect corrosion and crack was introduced by AAIB. They also ordered a modification to provide better access for ground engineers into difficult to reach areas within the aircraft.

== See also ==
- China Airlines Flight 611
- Japan Airlines Flight 123
