= Shirley Hex =

English milliner and educator (1933–2024)

Shirley Hex (1933–2024) was a British milliner and educator. Hex started working as a milliner in London as a teenager, she was later head of millinery at British couture houses including Lachasse, she ended her career as a lecturer in millinery in higher education including at Middlesex University and the Royal College of Art. Her students included leading British milliners and designers Stephen Jones, Philip Treacy and Noel Stewart. Stephen Jones acknowledged her a his muse and credited her for a revival in British millinery.

Born in 1933 in London, to Bob and Ethel Hex. Hex began her millinery career in London as a teenager, with a wage of £1 per week. In the 1950s she worked in the workshops of London millinery brands including Madame Vernier and Edward Mann.

In 1976 Hex started at the head of the millinery for British couture house Lachasse, where she trained Stephen Jones as an intern. She then worked as head of millinery at Frederic Fox in London. While working there she made many hats worn by guests at the wedding of Prince Charles and Lady Diana Spencer. After her retirement from the major brands workshops she turned to teaching but continued to make hats for Queen Elizabeth II. In the 1990s, Hex made hats for John Galliano's catwalk shows.

Hex lectured in millinery at Middlesex University, Harrow University, Surrey Institute of Art & Design and the Royal College of Art. Her students included notable milliners and fashion designers such as Stephen Jones, Philip Treacy, Flora McLean, Deborah Miller, Noel Stewart and Misa Harada.
