= Lampshade hat =

Headwear

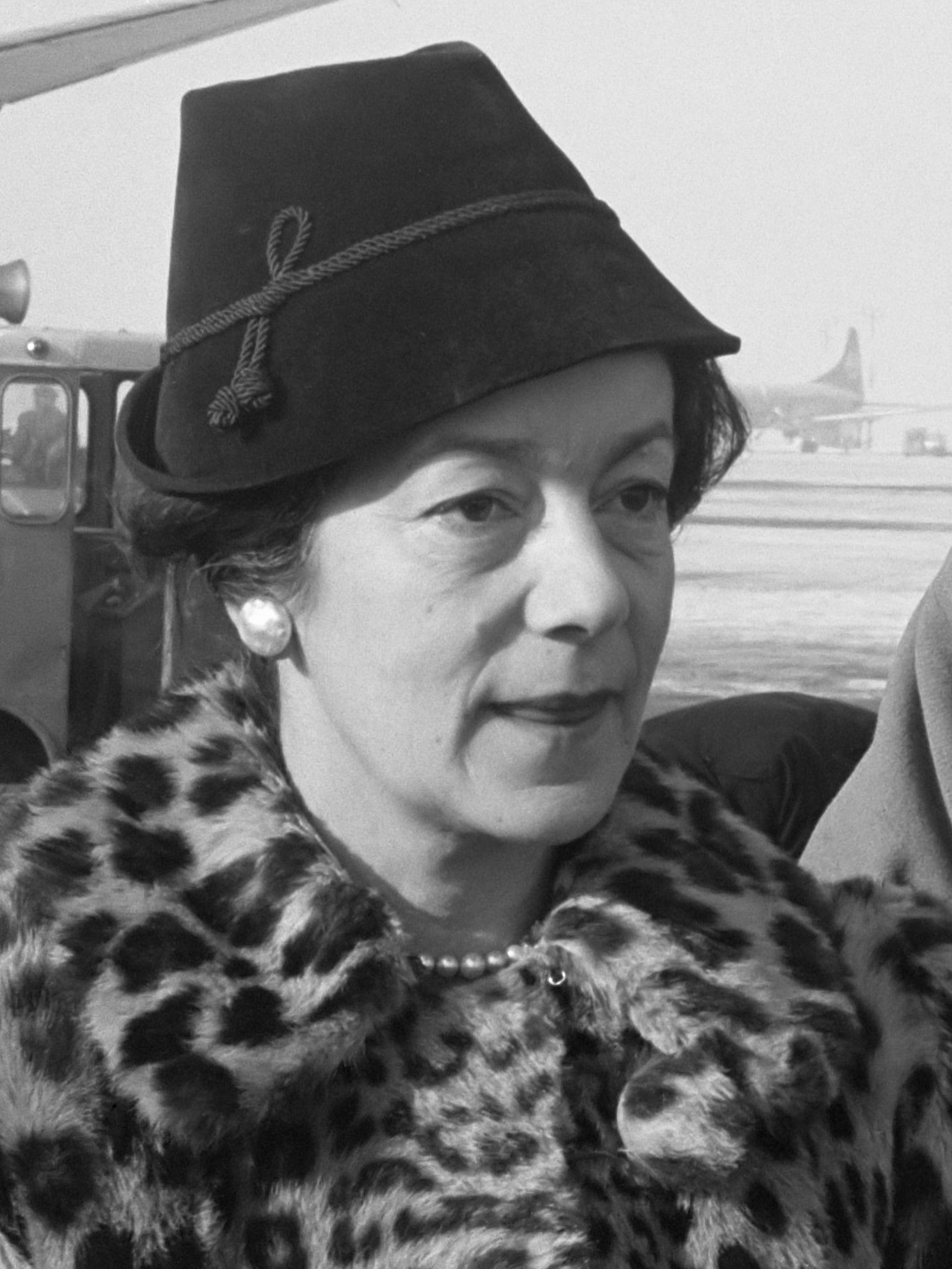
A lampshade design from 1963 with a simple cord trimming

A lampshade hat is a millinery design in which the hat has a small circular crown – typically flat, but sometimes rounded – and flares outwards to create a cone-like profile. In shape, it may have some similarities to the pillbox and bucket hat, both of which were popular at around the same time, although the classic lampshade design is longer and more flared than a pillbox (typically ending at or below the ears) and is generally made of stiffer material than a bucket hat.

The Asian conical hat and the mushroom hat are sometimes termed lampshade, as well as any oversized or lavishly trimmed hat.

== History of the design ==
The lampshade style was popularised by Christian Dior in the 1950s and remained fashionable through the next decade. Dior continued to feature variations in his collections into the early 1960s. Early versions could be trimmed or decorated, or could rely on shape alone for effect.

Writing in The Guardian in 1953 about the London spring collections, Clair Wilson described a: "lampshade of a hat" designed by Simone Mirman and shown at John Cavanagh's London show. This model was pleated and matched to a black silk cape. A year later, Wilson described a new season's design that was quite close fitting, in the manner of a helmet, adding that it was: "devoid of decoration and having some relationship to the cloche in concealing most of the hair".

By 1956, lampshades and pillboxes were said to be overtaking the previously popular mushroom and cartwheel designs at Ascot races. A reviewer of the opening day's fashions noted: "1956 must be dismissed as an unspectacular year. Gone were the cartwheels and giant mushrooms of other years, and in their place were pill-boxes (Princess Margaret), lampshades (Princess Alexandra) and various derivations of the beret".

Notable examples of the design include the red lampshade hat worn by Doris Day in the 1959 romantic comedy Pillow Talk. Costumes for this film were created by French costume/fashion designer Jean Louis.

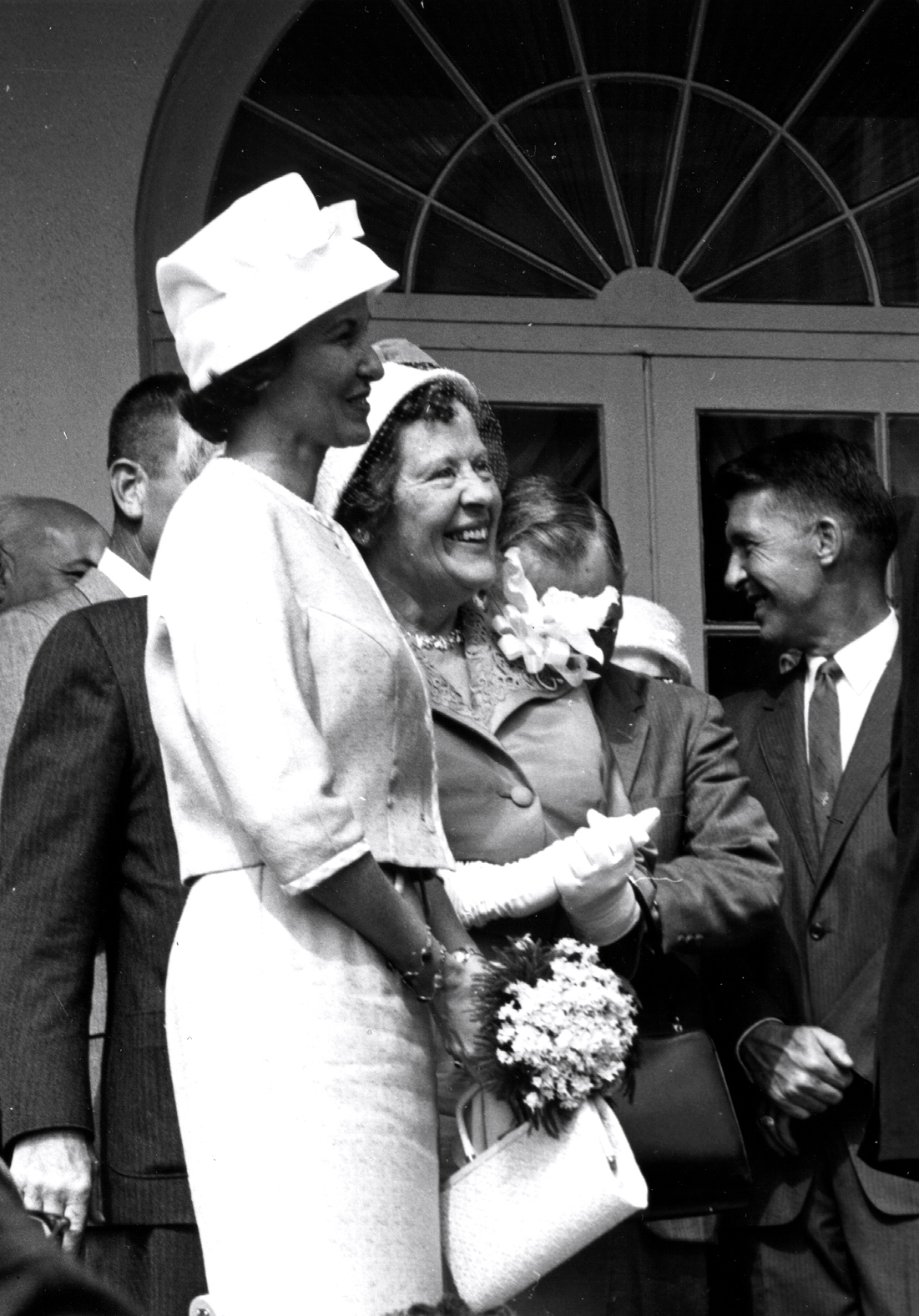
In 1961, Louise Shepard wore a lampshade hat with front bow at a NASA award ceremony for her husband Alan B. Shepard.

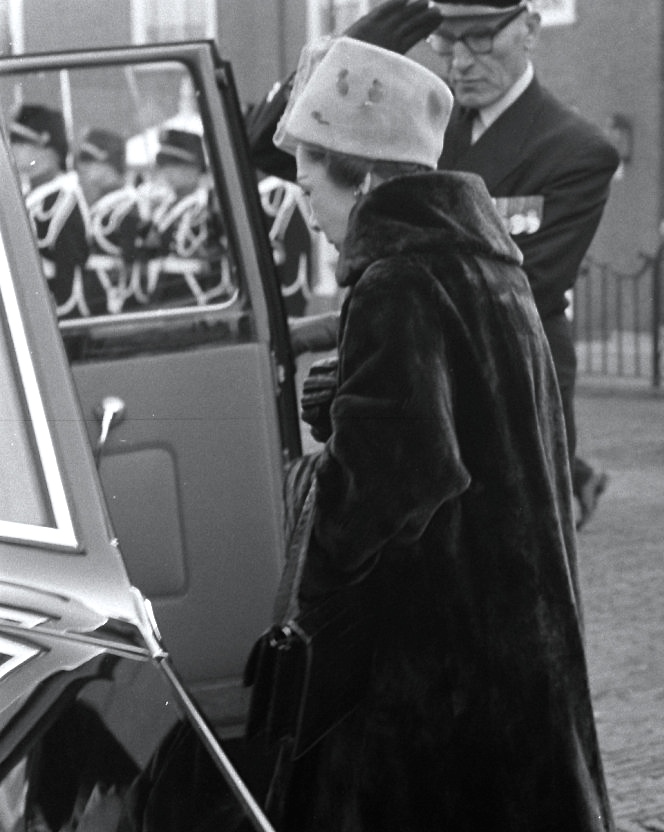
First lady of Argentina Clorinda Málaga de Prado wearing a soft fabric lampshade-style model in 1960 on a trip to Rotterdam

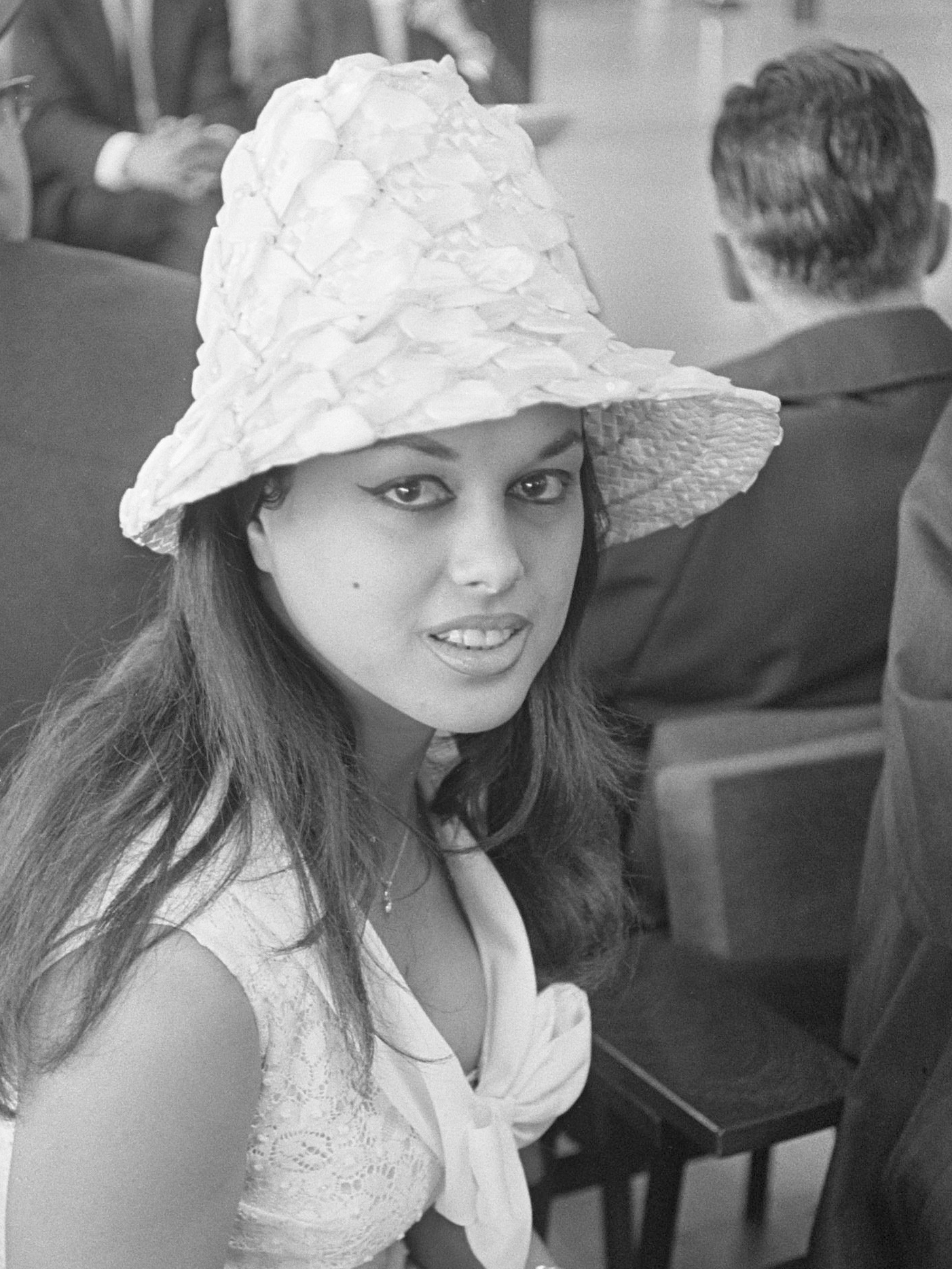
Beauty queen and actress Aliza Gur wearing a flared lampshade hat with textured pattern in 1964

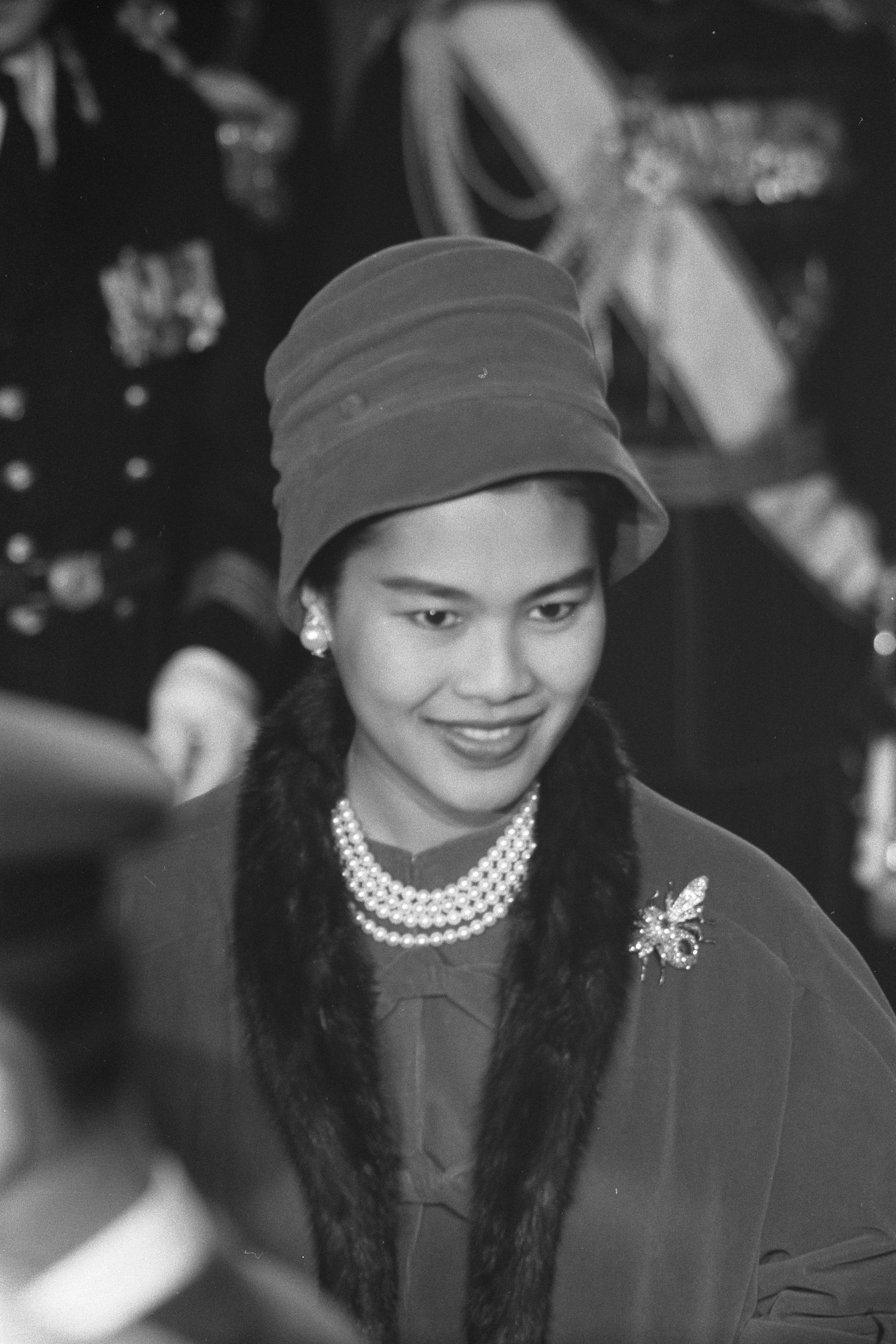
Queen Sirikit of Thailand wearing a close-fitting variation on the lampshade, incorporating ruching and slightly flared brim in 1960

== Variations ==
Like the pillbox, the lampshade remained popular into the 1960s, as hems rose and Space Age fashions took hold. Adaptations included both close-fitting and flared designs, as well as what fashion correspondent John Hart Roberts described as the "lampshade helmet", worn with hooded pullover, walking skirt and stockings at designer Maljana's Florence fashion show in 1965.

=== Revivals ===
John Galliano, designing for Dior, showed a variety of extreme lampshade-style hats in 2008 – these were created by milliner Stephen Jones. The design duo DSquared2 recreated 1950s-style lampshade hats for their spring/summer 2014 fashion show in September 2013 at Milan Fashion Week. Other designers showing lampshade-inspired designs for 2014, included L'Wren Scott and Lyn Devon.

== See also ==
- List of hat styles
- Mushroom hat
- Bucket hat
- Pillbox hat
