= Reed Crawford =

British milliner

- Born: John Reed-Crawford; 1924; UK
- Died: 4 March 2006; Suffolk
- Occupation: Milliner
- Notable credit(s): Dress of the Year, 1963

Reed Crawford (born John Reed-Crawford) (1924-2006) was a British milliner of the 1950s and 1960s. He produced a series of high-fashion designs that matched the Swinging London mood of the 1960s, including helmet-style cloche hats and designs in unusual material combinations, such as plastic and fur. He became especially associated with couture, working with the designer John Cavanagh from 1959 and joining the Incorporated Society of London Fashion Designers as an associate member from 1961.

One of Reed Crawford's designs was chosen as part of the first Dress of the Year ensemble in 1963.

== Early life and career ==
Reed Crawford was interested in hats from childhood and, after military service, he attended Liverpool College of Art; later, he moved on to Royal College of Art to study fashion. After graduating, he joined the milliner Miss Hammond, who was based in Brook Street, Mayfair. From there, he moved on to work with Rose Vernier, a prestigious milliner whose clients included Princess Marina. In 1954, he set up his own hatmaking business.

=== Work with John Cavanagh ===
Reed Crawford joined the couturier and Incorporated Society of London Fashion Designers (IncSoc) member John Cavanagh in July 1959 and his designs soon attracted coverage in the fashion press. Writing in The Guardian about the autumn fashion shows, Belle Lawrie described: "the fantastic impact of Reed Crawford's tall hats (this milliner has been with Cavanagh for but the past ten days)". In The Times these new models were described as: "high, narrow, domed hats...rather reminiscent of the early twenties". Reed Crawford's high helmet-like cloche hats for John Cavanagh continued in 1960, but they were also joined by similarly high-line designs in pleated tulle. In 1961 John Cavanagh was chosen to design the dress for the wedding of Katharine Worsley to Prince Edward, Duke of Kent and, along with fellow Incorporated Society of London Fashion Designers members Angele Delanghe and Hardy Amies, Cavanagh provided a preview in The Times of three designs to be worn by guests at the wedding. Cavanagh's outfit, a suit with pleated skirt and long jacket, was accessorised with a small white petal hat created by Reed Crawford. In 1961 Reed Crawford was elected as an associate member of the Incorporated Society of London Fashion Designers (IncSoc) – a category reserved for accessories designers – one of only four milliners within IncSoc at this point.

In 1962, Reed Crawford, still working with Cavanagh, was designing models to add length to the fashion silhouette; these included chefs' caps, turbans and trilbies; materials used for his designs included velvet, felt and velour. For evening wear, he designed small caps topped with aigrettes and plumes of tulle.

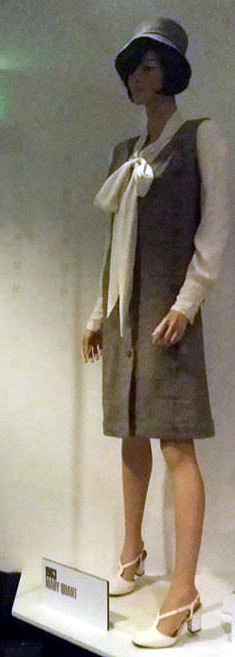
In 1963, Reed Crawford's trilby hat was chosen to accessorise a Mary Quant pinafore dress and blouse as part of the first Dress of the Year ensemble

A year later, his grey trilby was chosen, in combination with a Mary Quant dress, for the very first Dress of the Year outfit; it was selected by the Fashion Writers' Association.

== Brand hallmarks ==
Although Reed Crawford was working within the couture system, his key interest was in radical design and material combinations. A collection of plastic hats created in 1965 for visitors to Royal Ascot attracted international attention, with designs comprising a modified souwester, a helmet hat and a bonnet style with visor. He described the hats as "wet paddock" millinery; a Canadian newspaper suggested they would be excellent for fishing in combination with hip-waders. He undertook occasional publicity stunts, including 'icing' felt hats using a syringe filled with quick-drying plastic glue and creating a hat called 'Dollar Princess' made of aluminium milk bottle tops – both publicising the work of IncSoc members. More unusual fabric combinations included his 1966 transparent PVC hats trimmed with mink fur.

His aspirations as a designer did not always dovetail with the market he served. In a 1990s interview for the Costume Society, he said: "we basically dealt with the gentry. That was a bit difficult for me because I wanted to be in the avant-garde of fashion". In the same interview, he described his interest being primarily in the sculptural aspects of hatmaking and the variety of techniques and materials that could be used to create them.

Not all his designs met with approval from the fashion press. Alison Adburgham of The Guardian described him as a milliner of "outrageous convictions". Reviewing his 1964 autumn/winter collection, she said: "As for Reed Crawford's hats, they beggar description, especially his cocktail confections: high-standing exclamation pieces stuck through with monstrous hat-pins. Funnier hats have appeared in pantomimes, but not much funnier".

== Later career and legacy ==
Following his career in couture, Reed Crawford became a lecturer at the London College of Fashion. A selection of images of his work with John Cavanagh is held by the University of the Arts' VADS archive. His Dress of the Year hat – one of his less radical designs – is part of the permanent collection at the Fashion Museum, Bath.
