= Alison Adburgham =

English journalist (1912–1997)

- Born: Majorie Vere Alison Haig; 28 January 1912; Yeovil, Somerset, England
- Died: 23 May 1997 (aged 85); Truro, Cornwall, England
- Occupations: Journalist, author and social historian

Alison Adburgham (28 January 1912 – 23 May 1997) was an English journalist, author and social historian, best known for her work as fashion editor of The Guardian newspaper, a position she held for 20 years. Along with Prudence Glynn of The Times and Alison Settle of The Observer, she pioneered British fashion journalism in a broadsheet national newspaper; as a bylined columnist, influencing public perception of trends in clothing, the industry itself. She also wrote several books on social history.

== Early life and career ==
Adburgham was born Marjorie Vere Alison Haig on 28 January 1912 in Yeovil, Somerset, as the daughter of a doctor and an "unnervingly educated mother". She was educated at home before winning a scholarship to Roedean, an independent girls' school outside Brighton.

Her first job was as an advertising copywriter, while contributing articles on manners and style to Clever Night & Day magazine. She took a break from writing after marrying a copywriter, with whom she had four children.

== Fashion journalism ==
After the Second World War, Adburgham began contributing to Punch and later through The Guardian women's editor Mary Stott. She began to cover fashion collections at a time when newspaper fashion journalism was in its infancy in the UK, becoming an expert in the fashion industry of post-war Europe and in fashion history.

Adburgham's earliest bylined fashion piece, in December 1954, approached the wider relevance of fashion: "Over the last half-century there has been a complete change of attitude towards dress. Intelligent women no longer feel it is only the unintelligent who are interested in clothes; highbrows no longer ignore high fashion. When the question is asked, 'What has Dior done to us this season?' that pronoun refers to all women; and not least to those who sit on platforms, who are guests at literary luncheons, or who catch the Speaker's eye in the House."

Adburgham could be disapproving of the foibles of fashion. Writing about the latest collection of hats by Reed Crawford in 1964, she said they "beggar description, especially his cocktail confections: high-standing exclamation pieces stuck through with monstrous hat-pins. Funnier hats have appeared in pantomimes, but not much funnier." In a 1967 interview with Mary Quant, reprinted in 2005, Adburgham grilled the "Swinging London" designer on the line between fashion and vulgarity, questioning some more permissive elements of the 1960s look and asking Quant, "Would you agree that just as there is brutalism in architecture... there is an element of brutalism in fashion today?"

Adburgham's 1997 obituary in The Guardian by Veronica Horwell stated she was not given to fashion excesses herself – describing her as wearing "rather Design Council style" clothes. A letter in response from Fiona MacCarthy said "Design Council approved" was an unfair description of her style, adding, "She turned up at a party of mine in the 1960s looking rather like a dissolute exiled Polish countess in claret-red velvet with cascading ruffles at the neck."

Alongside her career reporting on trends in clothing, Adburgham worked with the fashion industry, serving as a governor of the London College of Fashion.

== Writing ==
Adburgham wrote several books of social history, in later life from her home in North Cornwall. Her obituary recalled that the chapter on Liberty of London she included in her first book, Shops and Shopping, was later expanded into a biography of the store for its 1975 centenary, while Women in Print was seen as one of the standard reference works for media studies and for women's studies.

=== Partial bibliography ===
Details as they appear in the British Library catalogue:

- A Punch History of Manners and Modes, 1841–1940 (London: Hutchinson, 1961)
- Shops and Shopping 1800–1914 (London: George Allen and Unwin, 1964)
- Women in Print (London: George Allen and Unwin, 1972)
- Liberty's: A Biography of a Shop (London: Allen and Unwin, 1975)
- Shopping in Style. London from the Restoration to Edwardian Elegance (London: Thames and Hudson, 1979)
- Silver Fork Society: Fashionable Life and Literature from 1814–1840 (London: Constable, 1983)
- A Radical Aristocrat: the Rt. Hon. Sir William Molesworth, Bart., PC, MP of Pencarrow and his wife Andalusia. (Padstow: Tabb House, 1980)
