= Aft pressure bulkhead =

Component of a large commercial aircraft

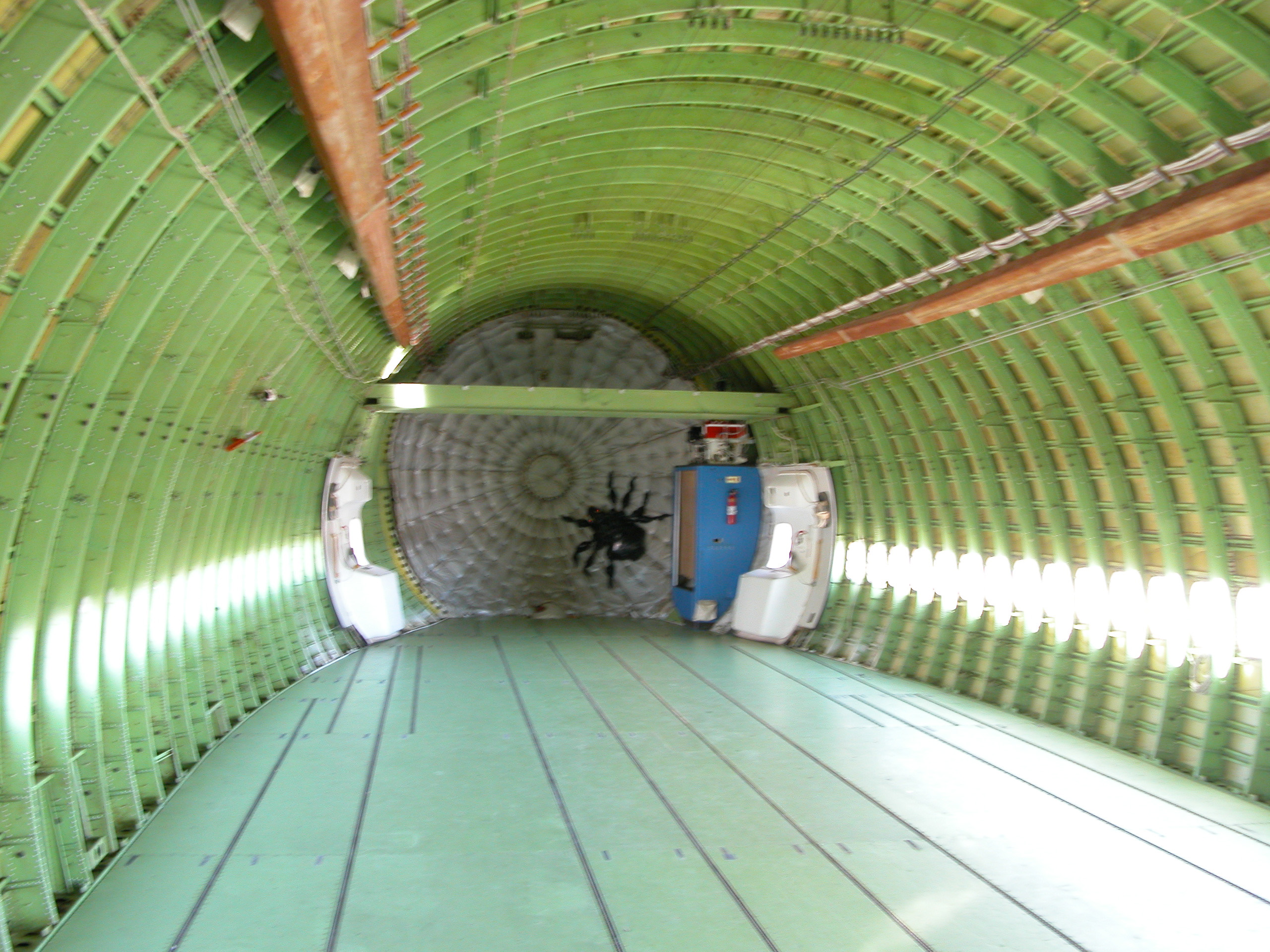
The aft end of the interior of NASA's Boeing 747 Shuttle Carrier Aircraft. The aft pressure bulkhead is the white circular component; its web-like structure led a NASA technician to attach a large model spider to it for comedic effect.

The aft pressure bulkhead or rear pressure bulkhead is the rear component of the pressure seal in all aircraft that cruise in a tropopause zone in the Earth's atmosphere. It helps maintain pressure when stratocruising and protects the aircraft from bursting due to the higher internal pressure.

== Design ==
Aft pressure bulkheads can either be curved, which reduces the amount of metal needed at the cost of reducing the usable space in the airliner, or flat, which gives more internal space but also more weight. Patents have been filed that propose deliberately creating cavities within the rear bulkhead with the purpose of providing more usable cabin space. On several airliners, production of the rear pressure bulkhead has been outsourced to third party manufacturers. While typically being a time-consuming and somewhat uncommon process, an aircraft's aft pressure bulkhead can be wholly replaced.

During the twenty-first century, various parties became increasingly interested in developing aft pressure bulkheads composed from composite materials, seeking benefits such as lower manufacturing costs, easier sealing, elimination of corrosion risk, along with weight and part count reductions. During the early 2000s, Airbus Group developed the largest manufactured resin film infusion structure then in production to function as the aft pressure bulkhead for their double-decker A380 airliner. The German aerospace supplier Premium AEROTEC, which successfully manufactured the world's first thermoplastic-based rear pressure bulkhead during the 2010s; according to the firm, the new unit had reportedly resulted in a 75% reduction in processing and assembly time as well as a noticeable weight saving over traditional aluminium counterparts.

== Failure incidents ==
A diagram of the aft pressure bulkhead of the Boeing 747 used on Japan Air Lines Flight 123

Multiple instances of damage to the aft pressure bulkhead have occurred; while a few cases have led to serious failures leading to aircraft losses, others have proven to be survivable. Aviation certifying authorities have often mandated inspections of an aircraft's aft pressure bulkhead in the interest of safety. Various techniques have been devised to determine the integrity of the rear pressure bulkhead; these have been used not only to inspect in-service examples but also in the design process, helping to design efficient bulkheads that possess sufficient strength to ensure a safe operational life.

In 1971, British European Airways Flight 706 crashed in Belgium, killing all 63 on board; the cause was determined to be corrosion of the rear pressure bulkhead by fluid contamination, perhaps from the lavatory. The corrosion was not detectable by the inspection techniques at the time.

In 1985, Japan Air Lines Flight 123 crashed after a catastrophic failure of the aft pressure bulkhead. The failure occurred due to faulty repair of the bulkhead after a tailstrike seven years earlier, when a single repair patch plate was incorrectly cut in two "to make it fit". Failure of the bulkhead damaged hydraulic pipes passing through. Boeing later calculated that the incorrect installation would be expected to fail after approximately 10,000 pressurizations; the repaired aircraft accomplished 12,318 successful flights before the crash.

During 2013, National Airlines Flight 102 crashed after loose freight on the main deck is believed to have penetrated the aft pressure bulkhead and caused damage to control systems in the vicinity of the bulkhead.
