= Rose Vernier =

Austrian-born milliner

Rose Vernier (13 November 1902 – 30 April 1975) was an Austrian-born milliner and fashion designer. She made hats for Queen Elizabeth II and her clients included members of the British Royal Family and celebrities. Vernier was one of the leading London milliners.

== Early life and career ==
Vernier was born in the village of Judenburg, Austria and migrated to England in 1938, on the eve of World War Two. She had trained in Vienna and Paris before establishing a millinery house in Poland. In 1945 she opened her fashion house Vernier Modelhats in London. The business had several premise in London's Mayfair, including salons at 82 George Street followed by 11 Dover Street.

Vernier marketed herself as a French milliner, she had trained in Austria and Paris. She opened her first salon on George Street. Princess Marina, Duchess of Kent and her daughter the Princess Alexandra were early patrons. Her clients included Queen Elizabeth II, Princess Alice, Duchess of Gloucester, Dame Margot Fonteryn, and Maria Callas. She was a member of the Incorporates Society of London Fashion Desigenrs (IncSoc) and was founding member of the trade union Associated Millinery Designers of London. A number of young milliners trained in her salon including Shirley Hex, Frederick Fox and John Reed-Crawford.

She works closely with a number of London couture houses, including Hardy Aimes, Charles Creed, Norman Hartnell, Giuseppe Mattli and Digby Morton. In 1967 she launched the label Vernier/Franka a collaboration with Yugoslavian designer Baroness Stael von Holstein, from her salon in Dover Street, specialising in haute couture.

Vernier retired in 1970, selling her business to milliner Frederick Fox.

In 1980 the Museum of London had a retrospective exhibition of her work, named A Head in Fashion: Millinery by Mme Rose Vernier.

== Personal life and death ==
On 22 July 1950 she married Ferdinand Charles Von Meissner in London. In her personal life she was known as Rose Eva von Meissner.

She died at home, in Great Cumberland Place, London, in 1975.
