= Philip Somerville =

English milliner

- Born: Philip Douglas Frank Somerville; 12 February 1930; Winchester, Hampshire, England
- Died: 14 September 2014 (aged 84)
- Occupation: Milliner
- Notable credit(s): Royal Warrant from the Queen, 1995.

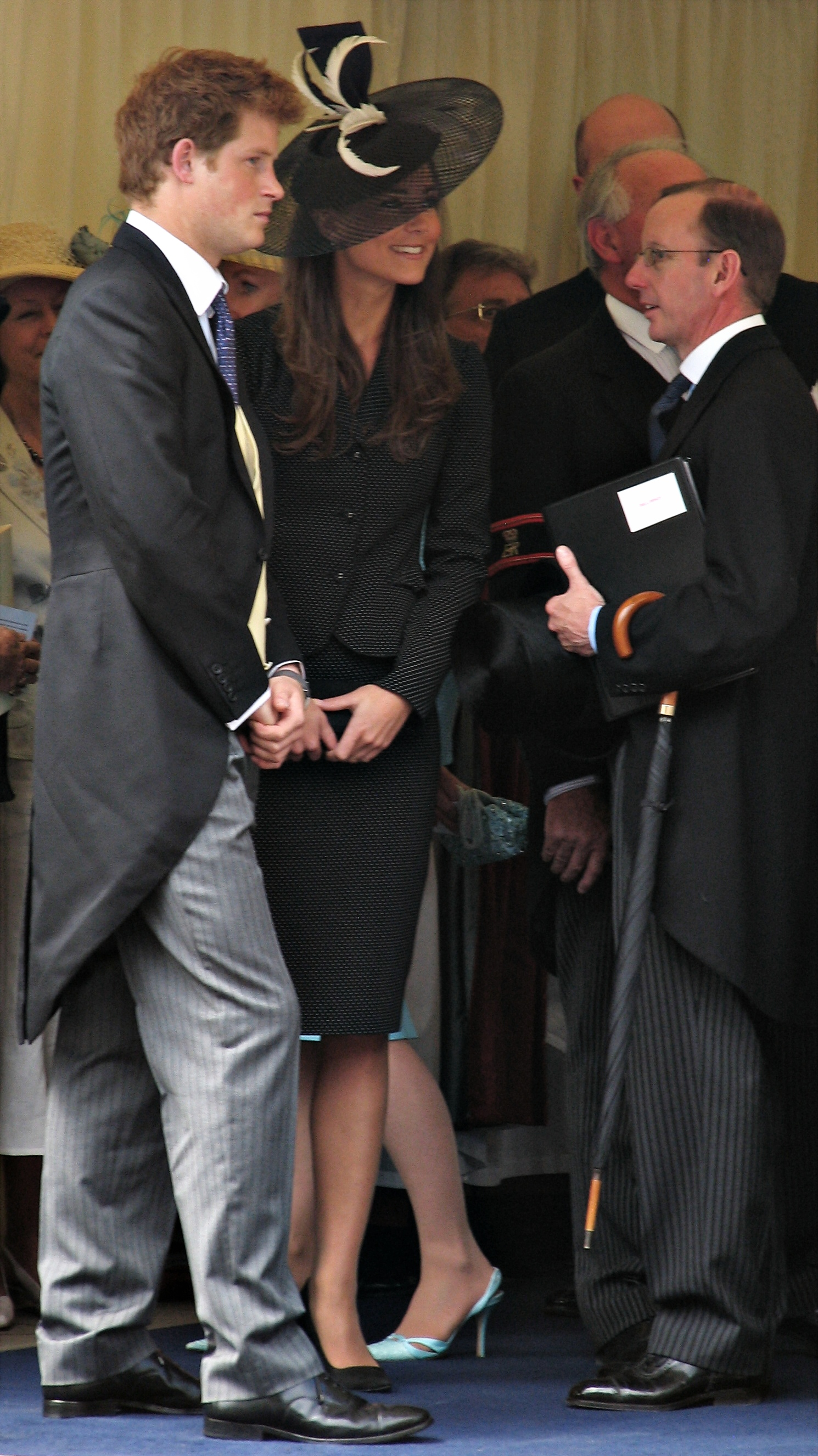
Kate Middleton, seen here with Prince Harry, hired a Philip Somerville hat in 2008 that sold for over £3,000 at a charity auction in 2012

Philip Douglas Frank Somerville (12 February 1930 – 14 September 2014) was an English milliner – partly trained in Auckland – who had a salon in London. He is widely known for hats worn by Queen Elizabeth II – from whom he held a royal warrant – and Diana, Princess of Wales. He also created headgear worn by two James Bond villainesses.

His obituary in The Sunday Times said of his influence on Diana's fashion sense: "he helped to mould her style – and with it the country's taste in hats".

== Early life and career ==
The son of a shoe repairer, Philip Somerville was born in the Hampshire city of Winchester and educated at St Thomas's School. After a spell in the Merchant Navy, he became an actor in Australia without much success. His family moved from Winchester to Invercargill on the South Island of New Zealand and Somerville joined them there. In 1953, he took a job with Jean Hat Company and then moved on to Star Hat Company in Auckland. In 1961, Star Hat Company sent him back to the UK on a "study holiday", giving him an allowance for his trip. Somerville paid back the money to his employer and joined the milliner Otto Lucas as sales manager and assistant.

== Own label ==
Somerville began designing hats for the Otto Lucas brand and, after Lucas was killed in 1971 in a plane crash, set up in business for himself. He supplied London stores such as Harrods, as well as exclusive retailers in New York City, before opening his own store in Bond Street for bespoke and private clients in 1987. Later, his premises moved to Chiltern Street, Marylebone.

The Queen became a Somerville client in the early 1980s and, during the height of this design relationship, he was supplying her with around 50 hats a year. This was a process that involved careful colour matching with her clothes designers as well as multiple fittings to ensure the hat fitted and stayed on whatever the weather conditions. Other British royal clients included Princess Diana and the Duchess of Kent, while fans among European royalty included Queen Silvia of Sweden. Somerville is said to have persuaded Princess Diana to move towards larger hats with wider brims, rather than the feathered and netted creations she favoured in the early years, and he believed this change of style helped to revive hat sales among younger customers.

More recently, Somerville made a hat hired by the then Catherine Middleton. This was sold at a charity auction in 2012 for more than twice its guide price.

=== Other clients ===
Other noted wearers of Somerville hats included Kiri te Kanawa, Joan Collins and Margaret Thatcher.

Somerville made hats for two James Bond film villains – the oversized black hat worn by Xenia (Famke Janssen) in GoldenEye and the fur hat sported by Elektra King (Sophie Marceau) during the skiing chase sequence in The World Is Not Enough.

Though Somerville had established his name as a celebrity milliner, many of his hats were bought or rented (Kate Middleton spent £100 hiring her Somerville creation) by non-celebrities for weddings or special events. About a third of his business centred round Royal Ascot.

=== Apprentices ===
Hatmaker Rachel Trevor-Morgan (now herself a Royal Warrant holder) was an apprentice at Somerville's salon before setting up her own business. She has said it was her time working at his salon that taught her the value of "people relations". Somerville continued trading until 2008, when he retired and his Chiltern Street hat salon closed.
