= Aarsele =

Section of Tielt, Belgium

Coordinates: 51°00′N 3°25′E

Aarsele is a village in the Belgian province of West Flanders and a subdivision of the city of Tielt in the western part of the country, 70 km west of Brussels, the capital. Aarsele is located 35 meters above sea level, and has a population of about 3,000.

== History ==
The earliest written reference to Aarsele dates from 1038 when it appears as Arcela, a Germanic word joining arda (= meadow) and sali (= chamber, house).

In earlier times Aarsele was under the rule of the Kortrijk who had holdings divided into several fiefdoms such as Donsegem and Hogenhove. Some fiefdoms also belonged to ecclesiastical orders including the abbeys of Lobbes and of Baudelo and Saint-Baafs in Ghent.

The main fiefdom however was Gruuthuse, which had 12 achterlenen (lords who are subject to another landlord). The achterlenen did not have title, which resided with the wealthy Lewis de Bruges, famous for hosting Edward IV of England at his Bruges home after the king was exiled in 1471. Lewis was also a well known bibliophile whose collection of illuminated manuscripts was given, but for a few exceptions, to Louis XII of France.

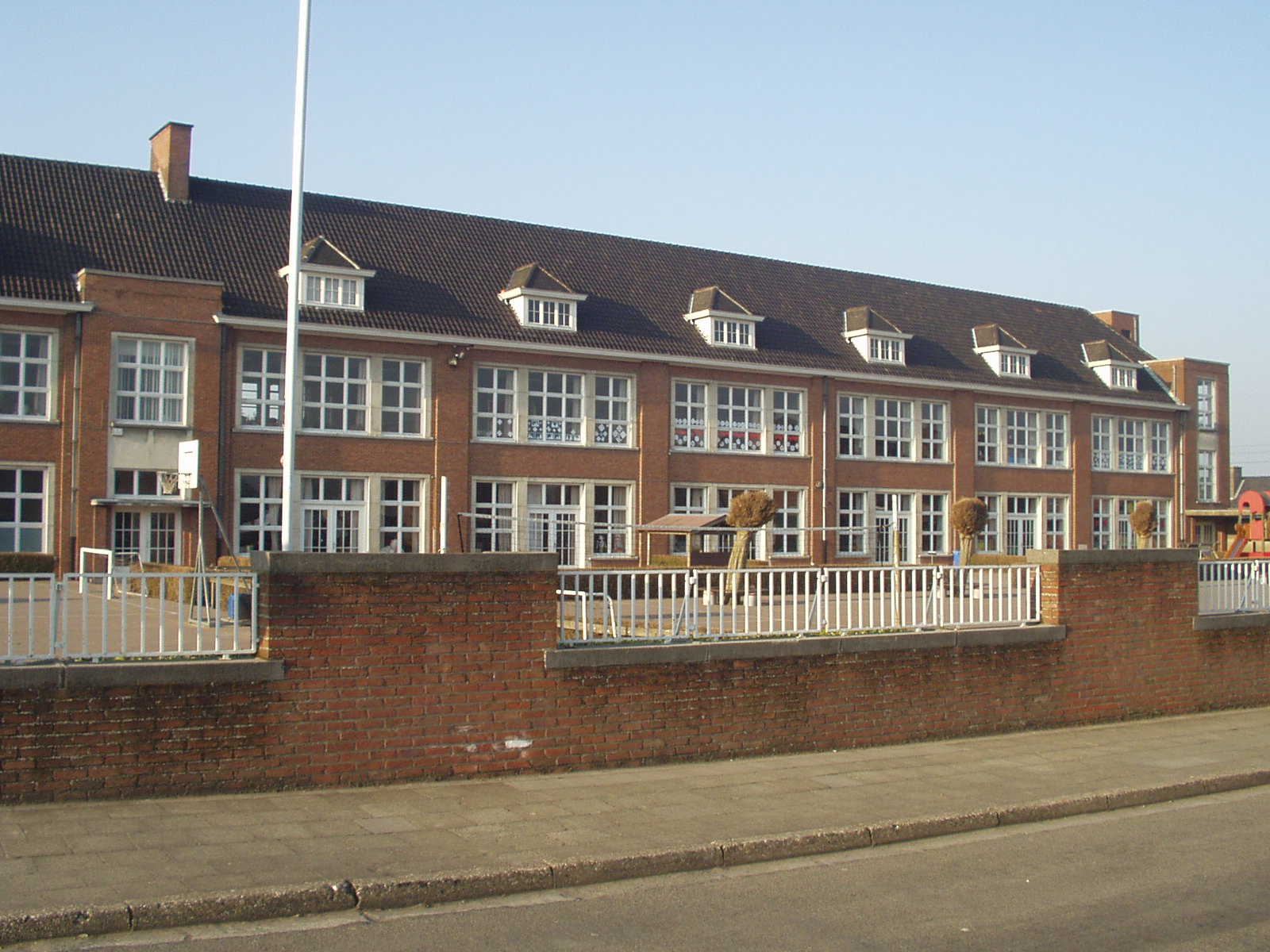
"Vrije Basisschool Aarsele-Kanegem" (primary school) in Aarsele.

Jan of Bruges was the last male descendant from the Gruuthuse line. After his death at the end of the 16th century, the fiefdom passed to Jakob II of Luxembourg. And by the marriage of his daughter to Jan van Egmont, the fiefdom was later transferred to the house of Egmont.

In 1568, the son of Jan van Egmont, Lamoral, was decapitated on orders from Philip II of Spain in Brussels. After his death successively two childless sons came into possession of Gruuthuse. In 1617, and for the next two generations, the fiefdom was held by the Richardot family. Finally, the marriage of Guillaume to Carla-Eugenia brought an end to the feudal system, or Ancien Régime.

As Aarsele was situated on the road between Ghent and Tielt it was not immune to plunder. Thus the municipality was devastated by the geuzen, a confederacy of nobles and malcontents, in 1580. Later during the 17th century French armies laid waste to the town in 1646 and 1690. Between those infamous dates, in 1666 Aarsele was visited by the plague.

== Attractions ==
The Delmerens Mill, also called Termote Mill, is a registered grain and oil mill dating from 1897, which ceased to operate in 1956. Saint Martins Church is a nationally registered structure, with an interesting interior, a pulpit dating from about 1200 and splendid glass windows. On the south side two bas relief sculptures are a memorial to the battle which was fought in Aarsele in May 1940. In 1909, the building was rebuilt in field stone in early Gothic style and rectangular steeple.
