= Frederick Fox (milliner) =

British milliner

- Born: 2 April 1931; Urana, New South Wales, Australia
- Died: 11 December 2013 (aged 82)

Frederick Fox LVO (2 April 1931 – 11 December 2013) was an Australian-born British milliner who designed hats for Queen Elizabeth II and other members of the British Royal Family.

== Early life ==
One of nine children, Fox was born in Urana, New South Wales and began assembling and making hats from the age of nine. Fox trained under the Australian milliners Henriette Lamotte, Mrs Normoyle and Phyl Clarkson, from 1949 to 1958. Fox moved to London in 1958, and studied under the milliner Otto Lucas.

== Millinery ==
Fox joined Mitzi Lorenz from Otto Lucas, then went to Langée in Brook Street, Mayfair. Fox took over Langée in 1964, and later moved his atelier to Bond Street. By the late 1960s, Fox had joined the Queen's dressmaker Hardy Amies. Fox's first hats for the Queen were designed in 1968 for her tour of Argentina and Chile. In 1974, Fox was the recipient of a royal warrant of appointment as 'Milliner to HM The Queen'.

Fox made 350 hats for the Queen over 35 years, and also made hats for many members of the royal family, including Princess Alice, Duchess of Gloucester, Diana, Princess of Wales, Queen Elizabeth The Queen Mother, Princess Alexandra of Kent, Princess Michael of Kent and Princess Anne. His other notable clients included Hillary Clinton and Joan Collins.

Notable hats designed by Fox included flying-saucer-shaped hats for Princess Diana.

When he died in December 2013, numerous sources cited the pink hat with 25 fabric bells that the Queen wore to mark her Silver Jubilee at a thanksgiving service at St Paul's Cathedral as Fox's most famous design for the Queen. But it was confirmed by the Royal Collection Trust in August 2016 to be the work of Simone Mirman.

In films, Fox designed the white "crash helmets" worn in 2001: A Space Odyssey (1969) and hats for The Great Muppet Caper (1981) and Evil Under the Sun (1982).

== Honours and assessment ==
In 1999, Fox was appointed a Lieutenant of the Royal Victorian Order, and in 2013 he was named Australian of the Year in the UK. Fox was president of the Millinery Trades Benevolent Association and an honorary patron of the Australian Millinery Association. The Royal Mail stamp collection issued for the Queen's Diamond Jubilee featured four images of Queen Elizabeth wearing Fox's hats.

== Retirement and death ==
Despite his retirement in 2002, Fox occasionally made hats for his most established clients.

A Freeman of the City of London, Fox lived in Suffolk. Fox also regularly visited Australia and helped judge the Melbourne Cup's Fashion Field for over 20 years. For 53 years, Fox was the partner of the British fashion designer Murray Arbeid, who predeceased him in 2011.

The British milliner Stephen Jones wrote an obituary for Fox in Vogue. Jones wrote that

When I first started in hats, Freddie was the person in London and the greatest milliner there was...His hats had balance and they were never too heavy. He created hats for women who wore hats all day, and they could just forget about them once they put one on...He made hats that became part of the person; they never jarred...He had such an air of refinement about everything that he did; he had tremendous class and never did anything that was too much.
