= Stephen Jones (milliner) =

British milliner (born 1957)

Stephen Jones OBE
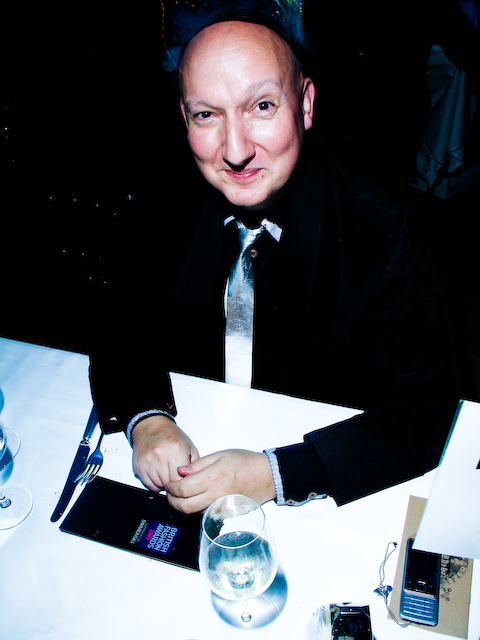
- Jones in 2007
- Born: 1957 (age 68–69); Wirral Peninsula, Cheshire, England
- Education: Liverpool College, Saint Martin's School of Art
- Labels: Stephen Jones; Miss Jones; JonesBoy
- Awards: Order of the British Empire,(OBE) Outstanding Contribution to Fashion, British Fashion Awards 2009, Accessory Designer of the Year 2005, 2024
- Website: StephenJonesMillinery.com

Stephen Jones OBE (born 1957) is a British milliner based in London, who is considered one of the most radical and important milliners of the late 20th and early 21st centuries. He is also one of the most prolific, having created hats for the catwalk shows of many leading couturiers and fashion designers, such as John Galliano at Dior and Vivienne Westwood. His work is known for its inventiveness and high level of technical expertise. Jones co-curated the 2009 exhibition Hats: An Anthology for the Victoria and Albert Museum.

== Early life ==
Stephen Jones was born on the Wirral Peninsula in Cheshire and educated at Liverpool College. From an early age, his mother instilled in him an appreciation of art by taking him around the Walker Art Gallery, Speke Hall, and to National Trust properties around the North West.

He studied art at foundation level at the High Wycombe College of Art. In 1975 he travelled to London to see the exhibition Fashion from 1900 to 1939 at the V&A, which inspired him to pursue a career in the fashion industry. This led him to apply to study fashion design under Elisabeth Suter, at the Saint Martin's School of Art, London, where he was the sole male student in his year. Although he enjoyed being taught by Peter Lewis Crown, the designer-owner of the London couture house Lachasse, he had little prior sewing experience, and so in order to develop his skills Crown secured Jones a summer placement in Lachasse's tailoring workroom.

Jones soon requested a transfer to the next-door millinery department presided over by Shirley Hex, but was told he had to make a hat from scratch first. The hat he eventually submitted, his first original millinery creation, was a cardboard pillbox covered in blue crêpe de Chine and trimmed with a plastic iris, sprayed silver that his mother had received as a free gift from a petrol station in the 1960s. In his innocence, Jones had not realised that millinery flowers were traditionally made of silk, but Hex approved the hat, commenting on the flower's modernity. Between 1976 and 1979 Jones spent his summer breaks working for Hex and learning about millinery methods and techniques. Through hats he developed a keen interest in fashion history, particularly the drama and exaggerated glamour of the 1950s.

Jones left Saint Martin's in 1979, the same year that he became a regular attendee of London's Blitz nightclub in Covent Garden for New Romantics and fans of new wave music. Jones had been a Punk while at St Martins, but keenly embraced the New Romantic movement as its drawing of inspiration from historical dress resonated with his thinking. As one of the "Blitz Kids", he hung out with the likes of Spandau Ballet, Duran Duran, Isabella Blow, and Jean Paul Gaultier; and shared a house with Boy George and Grayson Perry, competing with them to wear the most outrageous outfits to Blitz, including a pinstripe suit with stiletto heels. Many of the Blitz Kids became his first clients, with Jones creating outlandish hats for them to wear to the club.

== Millinery career ==
Jones designed a line of hats for Fiorucci in 1979. In 1980, Blitz's club host Steve Strange provided backing for Jones' first millinery salon, which opened nearby in the basement of the trendy store PX, Endell Street, Covent Garden on 1 October. It was an instant success, with Jones commenting in 2008: "Overnight, I had a business". 1982 saw Jones' first Paris fashion show with Steve Strange at Le Palace and his first televised show (for the BBC's Riverside) By this point, he was able to count Diana, Princess of Wales as a regular customer, in addition to his clients from Blitz, and had a hat acquired by the Victoria & Albert Museum for their newly refurbished Costume Court. This was the beginning of Jones' long and fruitful relationship with the V&A, culminating in the Hats: An Anthology by Stephen Jones exhibition of 2009 that he co-curated with Oriole Cullen. One of his hats appeared on the December 1982 cover of Tatler, the first time his work had featured on a magazine cover; the hat is now in the V&A.

Jones relocated his studio to Lexington Street, Soho in 1984. That year, Jean Paul Gaultier invited him to Paris to make hats for his show, his first designs for a Paris couturier, and he also made hats for Thierry Mugler. After their second show together, Gaultier ensured that Jones received full credit for his hats, therefore ensuring that the Paris fashion world was made aware of his work. In 1984 he also sold his first designs to a department store, Bloomingdale's in New York.

Jones was appointed Officer of the Order of the British Empire (OBE) in the 2010 New Year Honours.

=== Collections ===
This is a list of Stephen Jones' bi-annual hat collections since 1980. The collections from Fall 1981 to Fall 1984 were unnamed.

- 1980: Fall-Winter: First Collection
- 1981: Spring-Summer: The Hanging Gardens of Babylon
- 1985: Spring-Summer: Point Zero • Fall-Winter: For The Heart of Woman and the Soul of Man
- 1986: Spring-Summer: Passport to Pleasure • Fall-Winter: Heads of State
- 1987: Spring-Summer: She • Fall-Winter: Stephen Jones World +
- 1988: Spring-Summer: Sunset on Suburbia • Fall-Winter: Room Service
- 1989: Spring-Summer: Ole Steamy • Fall-Winter: Forty Five Degrees
- 1990: Spring-Summer: Passion on the Pampas • Fall-Winter: In Orbit
- 1991: Spring-Summer: Shriek With Chic • Fall-Winter: Glamé
- 1992: Spring-Summer: The Devil is a Woman • Fall-Winter: Norma Desmond Lives
- 1993: Spring-Summer: Souvenirs • Fall-Winter: Xanadu
- 1994: Spring-Summer: Miss World • Fall-Winter: Rococo Futura
- 1995: Spring-Summer: Legasty • Fall-Winter: Les Girls
- 1996: Spring-Summer: Untitled '96 • Fall-Winter: Contours
- 1997: Spring-Summer: Lotus Eaters • Fall-Winter: Murder by Millinery
- 1998: Spring-Summer: E=mc2 • Fall-Winter: Millinery Computer
- 1999: Spring-Summer: Pic 'n' Mix • Fall-Winter: Celebrations
- 2000: Spring-Summer: Nursery • Fall-Winter: Blah Blah Blah
- 2001: Spring-Summer: Icon • Fall-Winter: Queens
- 2002: Spring-Summer: High • Fall-Winter: North
- 2003: Spring-Summer: South • Fall-Winter: Poseur
- 2004: Spring-Summer: Hollywood Regency • Fall-Winter: La Prima Donna
- 2005: Spring-Summer: Handmade in England • Fall-Winter: Jubilee
- 2006: Spring-Summer: Travelogue • Fall-Winter: Time Travel
- 2007: Spring-Summer: Artifice • Fall-Winter: Shangri-La
- 2008: Spring-Summer: Desert Rose • Fall-Winter: Covent Garden
- 2009: Spring-Summer: Albertopolis • Fall-Winter: VandA
- 2010: Spring-Summer: ABC • Fall-Winter: XYZ
- 2011: Spring-Summer: Drifting and Dreaming • Fall-Winter: Topsy Turvy
- 2012: Spring-Summer: Chinoiserie-on-Sea • Fall-Winter: This is Tomorrow
- 2013: Spring-Summer: West • Fall-Winter: Art School
- 2014: Spring-Summer: Carte Blanche • Fall-Winter: Garbo-Gabo
- 2015: Spring-Summer: Hot House • Fall-Winter: Hatsville USA
- 2016: Spring-Summer: The Perfect Hat for... • Fall-Winter: Soho
- 2017: Spring-Summer: Shade • Fall-Winter: Haute Couture & Pret-a-Porter
- 2018: Spring-Summer: Hats • Fall-Winter: Crowns
- 2019: Spring-Summer: Parfum • Fall-Winter: #tophat
- 2020: Spring-Summer: 123 • Fall-Winter: Its About Time
- 2021: Spring-Summer: Analogue Fairydust • Fall-Winter: French Kiss
- 2022: Spring-Summer: Bonnes Vacances • Fall-Winter: Playlist
- 2023: Spring-Summer: El Morocco • Fall-Winter: Why, why not?
- 2024: Spring-Summer: Cymru • Fall-Winter: A Muse à Paris
- 2025: Spring-Summer: The Curve • Fall-Winter: SENSEational
- 2026: Spring-Summer: A Rainbow in Curved Air • Fall-Winter: Think Pink but Pack Black
- 2026: Spring-Summer: Flora Diaspora

In 1988 Jones moved again, to Heddon Street. His salon and workshop are based on Great Queen Street, Covent Garden, London as of 1995.

== Diffusion lines and non-millinery designs ==
In 1990, Jones launched a Miss Jones diffusion line for hats, and in 1993, this was followed by Jonesgirl which was exclusive to Japan. The Stephen Jones brand has had a strong presence in Japan since 1990, when Jones struck a licensing deal for T-shirts, cosmetic bags, scarves and handkerchiefs to be manufactured there under his name; this was followed by Stephen Jones Kimonos in 1991, sunglasses in 1992, gloves in 1993 and handbags in 2002. Jones was also a consultant for Shiseido Cosmetics, Japan from 1986-2002. Jones has occasionally designed garments and accessories other than hats. In 1983 he designed dresses for Susanne Bartsch's shop in SoHo, New York and furs for Sol Feldman Furs, New York, and created a shoe line for Sergio Rossi in 1987.

== Design partnerships ==
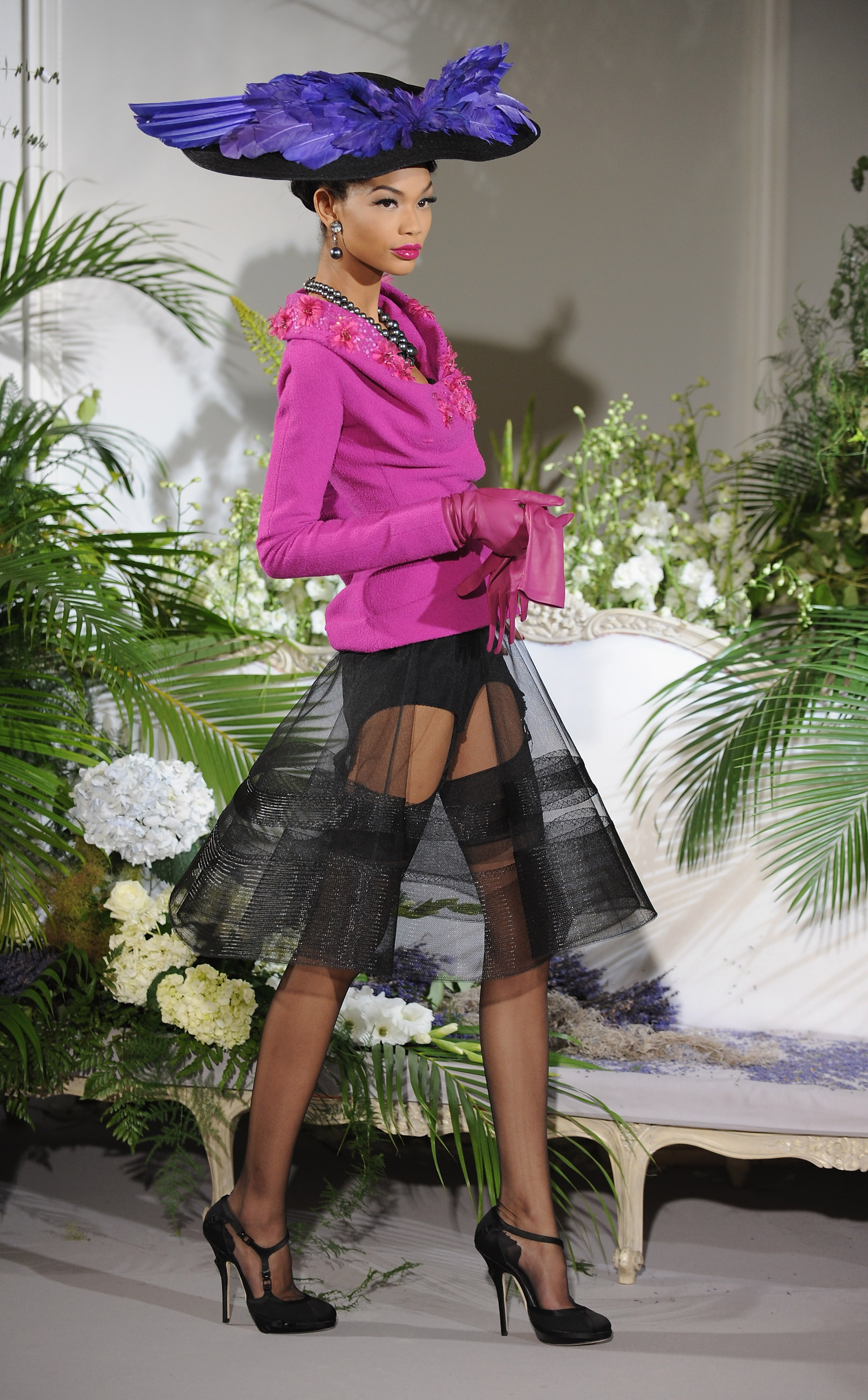
Chanel Iman modelling a Stephen Jones hat for the Christian Dior Haute Couture fashion show, Autumn-Winter 2009–10.

In November 1996, Stephen Jones was the only British milliner to have control of a Paris haute couture millinery studio, or Atelier Mode, making hats for Galliano's high-profile couture shows at Christian Dior where he is Creative Director of Hats and subsequently Raf Simons, Maria Grazia Chiuri, Kim Jones and Jonathan Anderson. Jones has collaborated with Galliano since 1993 for his namesake label, Dior and Maison Margiela. Jones also created Vivienne Westwood's iconic Harris Tweed Crown of 1987. Since the 1980s his hats have been in great demand for multiple shows per season. For the Paris collections in early 1995 alone, he was creating human-hair hats for Josephus Thimister's first collection at Balenciaga and designs for Peter O'Brien at Marcel Rochas and Claude Montana as well as Galliano. In 2008, he made hats for Marc Jacobs, L'Wren Scott, Thom Browne, Comme des Garçons, Giles Deacon, Loewe, and Walter van Beirendonck, Throughout his career he has designed hats for the shows of many other designers and couturiers.

== Stephen Jones and popular culture ==
In addition to his hat collections for designers, Jones has undertaken numerous individual high-profile commissions for pop groups, musicians, actors, and other celebrities. He has also been commissioned by a number of companies to create designs for advertisements and promotions.

=== Music ===
Grace Jones, Diana Ross, George Michael, Spandau Ballet and Culture Club were among Jones's first high-profile celebrity clients in the 1980s. Jones made a personal appearance in the Culture Club video Do You Really Want to Hurt Me? and went on to create headgear for Wham!, Wet Wet Wet, Madonna, Erasure, Bryan Ferry and Barbra Streisand.

In the 1990s, his client list expanded to include Monie Love, Paula Abdul, U2, The Rolling Stones, Cappella, New Order, Marc Almond, Billy Ray Martin, Take That, Belinda Carlisle, Mike + The Mechanics, Skunk Anansie, Eternal, B*Witched, All Saints, Celine Dion, and Kylie Minogue.

Jones's client list expanded through the first decade of the 21st century to include the Spice Girls, Robbie Williams, Sophie Ellis-Bextor, Hear'Say, Macy Gray, Björk, Steve Strange, Paul Simonon, Will Young, Pink, Tori Amos, Alison Goldfrapp, Christina Aguilera, Rihanna, Usher. Lady Gaga and Beyonce.

He created the hats for three major tours starting in 2005: Kylie Minogue's Showgirl, Mick Jagger's A Bigger Bang and Marilyn Manson's Against All Gods.

=== Films ===
Jones made the hats for Faye Dunaway in Supergirl, and also provided hats to Beverly Hills Cop II and Entrapment. From the 1990s onwards his film commissions became more frequent, including designs for Glenn Close as Cruella de Vil in 101 Dalmatians, the Spice World film, Jurassic Park, Lost in Space, and the hats for Lady Penelope (Sophia Myles) and Parker in Thunderbirds. He created the hats for leading ladies such as Cate Blanchett in Elizabeth: The Golden Age, Keira Knightley in Atonement, Dita Von Teese in The Death of Salvador Dali, William Dafoe in At Eternity's Gate and Audrey Tautou in Coco avant Chanel. Tautou reportedly commented during her fitting that Jones's hats made her feel like Coco Chanel, the character she was playing.

== Hats: An Anthology by Stephen Jones ==
The 2009 exhibition, Hats: An Anthology, held at the V&A from 24 February 2009, was inspired by Cecil Beaton's landmark exhibition, Fashion: An Anthology, held at the V&A in 1971. Beaton's exhibition showcased 1900-1971 garments donated by leading fashion designers of the 20th century and their clients, many of which entered the Museum collection afterwards, and firmly placed fashion within the Museum's remit. Along with Oriole Cullen, V&A Curator of Modern Fashion and Textiles, Jones explored the collections of the V&A and other international collections such as those at the Fashion Museum, Bath and the Hollywood archives of Warner Bros.

The exhibition was based predominantly upon hats from the V&A's collections and Stephen Jones's own archive, but also included loans from museums and collections around the world. The work of up-and-coming milliners such as Noel Stewart and Nasir Mazhar was featured alongside hats by Philip Treacy, Mitza Bricard for Dior, Claude Saint-Cyr for Norman Hartnell and Vladzio d'Attainville for Cristóbal Balenciaga. The exhibition also included hats worn by famous hat-wearers such as Gloria Guinness, Isabella Blow, Anna Piaggi, and Gertrude Shilling, as well as the hats of celebrities including Dita Von Teese, Madonna, and Boy George. Film millinery was also featured, such as Beaton's own designs for the stage and screen versions of My Fair Lady and hats worn by Ava Gardner and Marlene Dietrich. The exhibition launched during London Fashion Week with a lavish party attended by famous clients and admirers of Jones, including Piaggi, Daphne Guinness, Peter Blake, Erin O'Connor and Daisy Lowe.

The exhibition and its accompanying book (also called Hats: An Anthology) were generally well received. A month after opening, record-breaking visitor attendance figures were reported. The Evening Standard gave the exhibition four stars out of five. In the Toronto Star, the exhibition and book were described as a celebration and a delight.

The exhibition subsequently moved to The Queensland Art Gallery in Brisbane, Australia, then New York City at the Bard Graduate Center of Decorative Arts, Design History and Material Culture. Its final venue was The Peabody Essex Museum in Salem Massachusetts. It was noted as the second most visited decorative arts exhibition in the world, second only to American Woman at the Metropolitan Museum of Art in New York.

== Stephen Jones & The Accent of Fashion ==
This exhibition in 2010 at MoMuFashion Museum in Antwerp, Belgium celebrated 30 years of Stephen Jones Millinery. MoMu houses the largest collection of SJ hats, in 2010 more than 120 items thanks to a long term loan by the Antwerp private collectors Geert Bruloot and Eddy Michaels. This exhibition examined the various themes present in his work; Adventure, Science, Rococo, Glamour, Spotlight, and his unique relationship with fashion icon Anna Piaggi. It displayed his collaborations with full looks from, Azzedine Alaia, John Galliano, Claude Montana, Walter van Beirendonck, Vivienne Westwood, Comme des Garçons, Thierry Mugler, Marc Jacobs, and Christian Dior. After a successful run in Belgium it travelled in 2011 to The Vakko Fashion Institute, Istanbul, where it showcased Asian inspiration.

== Stephen Jones, Chapeaux d'artiste ==
The exhibition 'Stephen Jones, chapeaux d'artiste', at the Palais Galliera in October 2024 - March 2025 For the first time in over forty years at the Palais Galliera, an exhibition was devoted entirely to an accessory, the hat, treating it as a work of art in its own right. The exhibition focuses on Stephen Jones's creative process, the sources of inspiration behind his pieces, and the role of Paris in his work.

There were close to 400 works in the exhibition, including more than 170 hats, as well as Jones's archives (preparatory drawings, photographs, extracts from fashion shows, etc.) and around forty silhouettes complete with clothes and hats. These 'looks' were an indicator of the collaboration between Stephen Jones and some of the world's leading fashion houses, in particular Christian Dior, who he has worked with for nearly thirty years.

== See also ==
- Philip Treacy, Irish milliner based in London
