= List of headgear =

Headgear is worn for many purposes, including protection against the elements, decoration, or for religious or cultural reasons, including social conventions. This is a list of headgear, both modern and historical.

== Hats ==
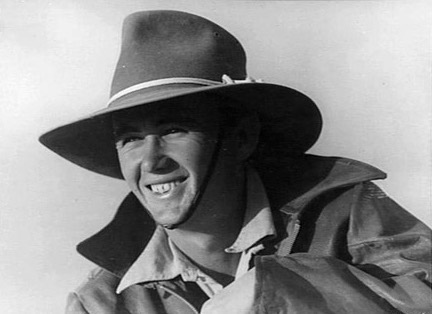
Akubra

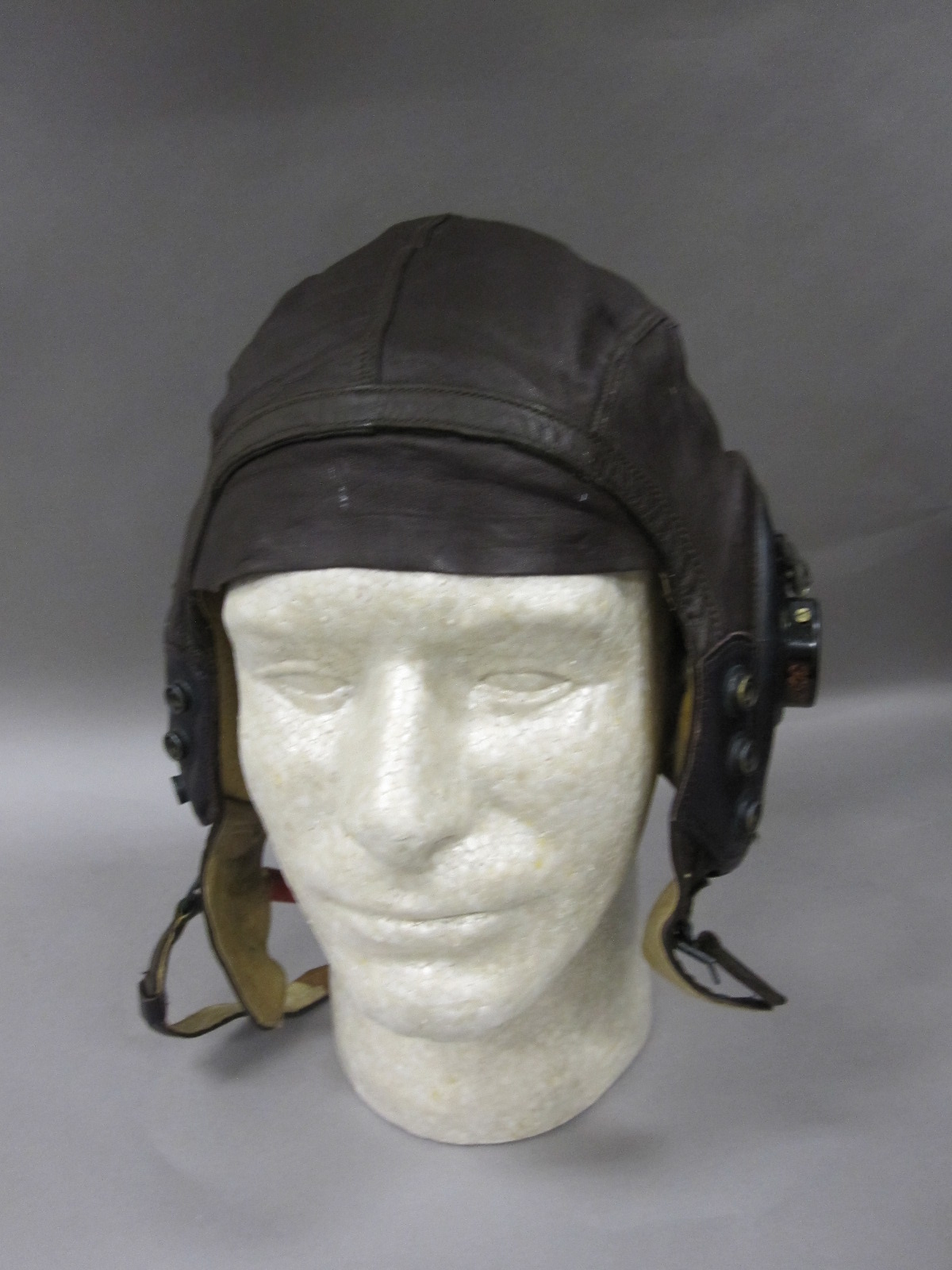
Leather flight helmet

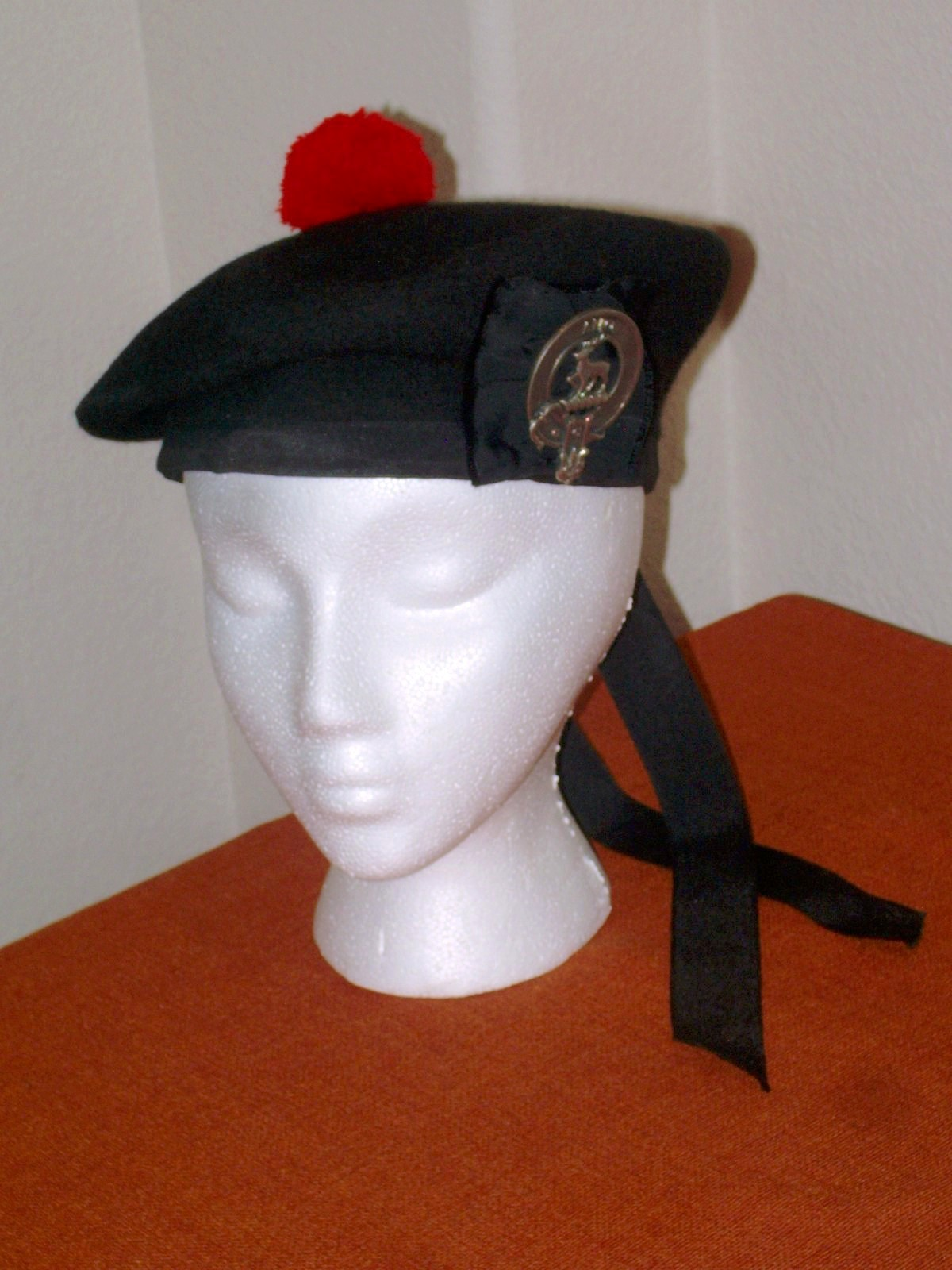
Balmoral

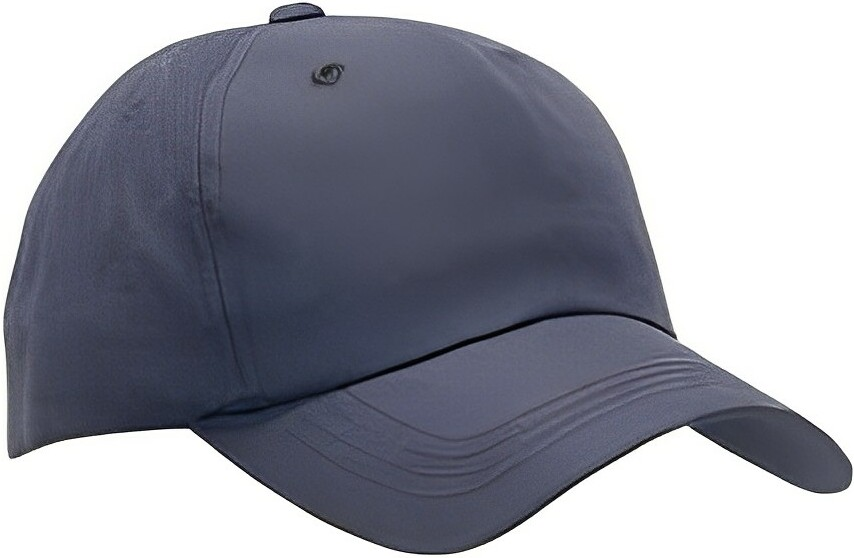
Baseball cap

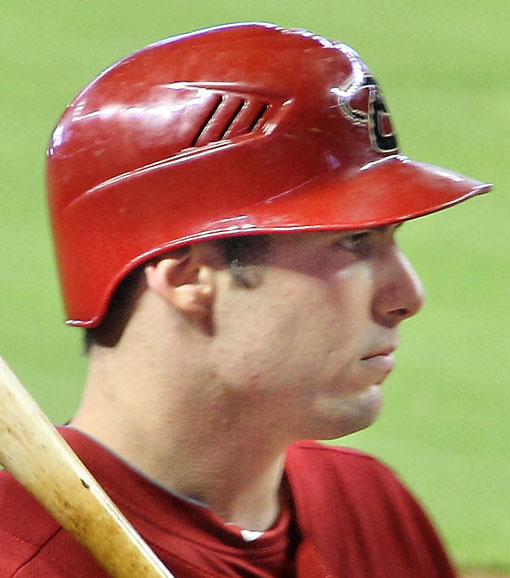
Batting helmet

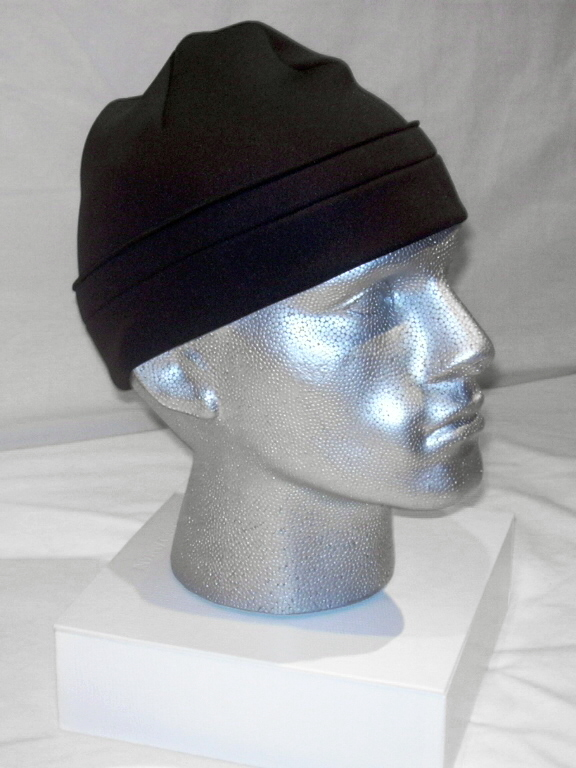
Beanie or skully and or visor beanie.

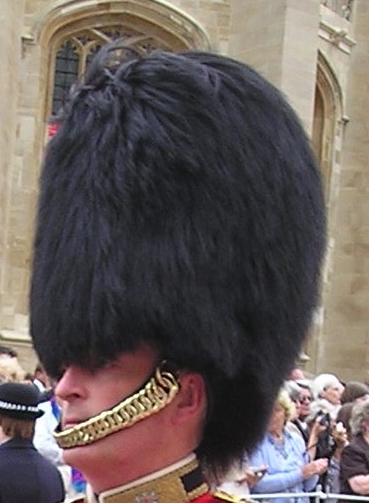
Bearskin ("busby" is incorrect)

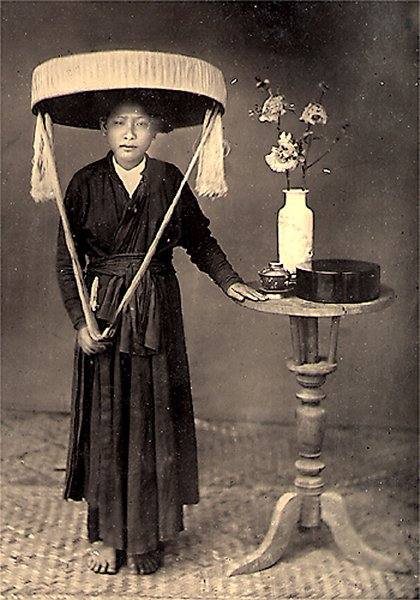
Ba tầm

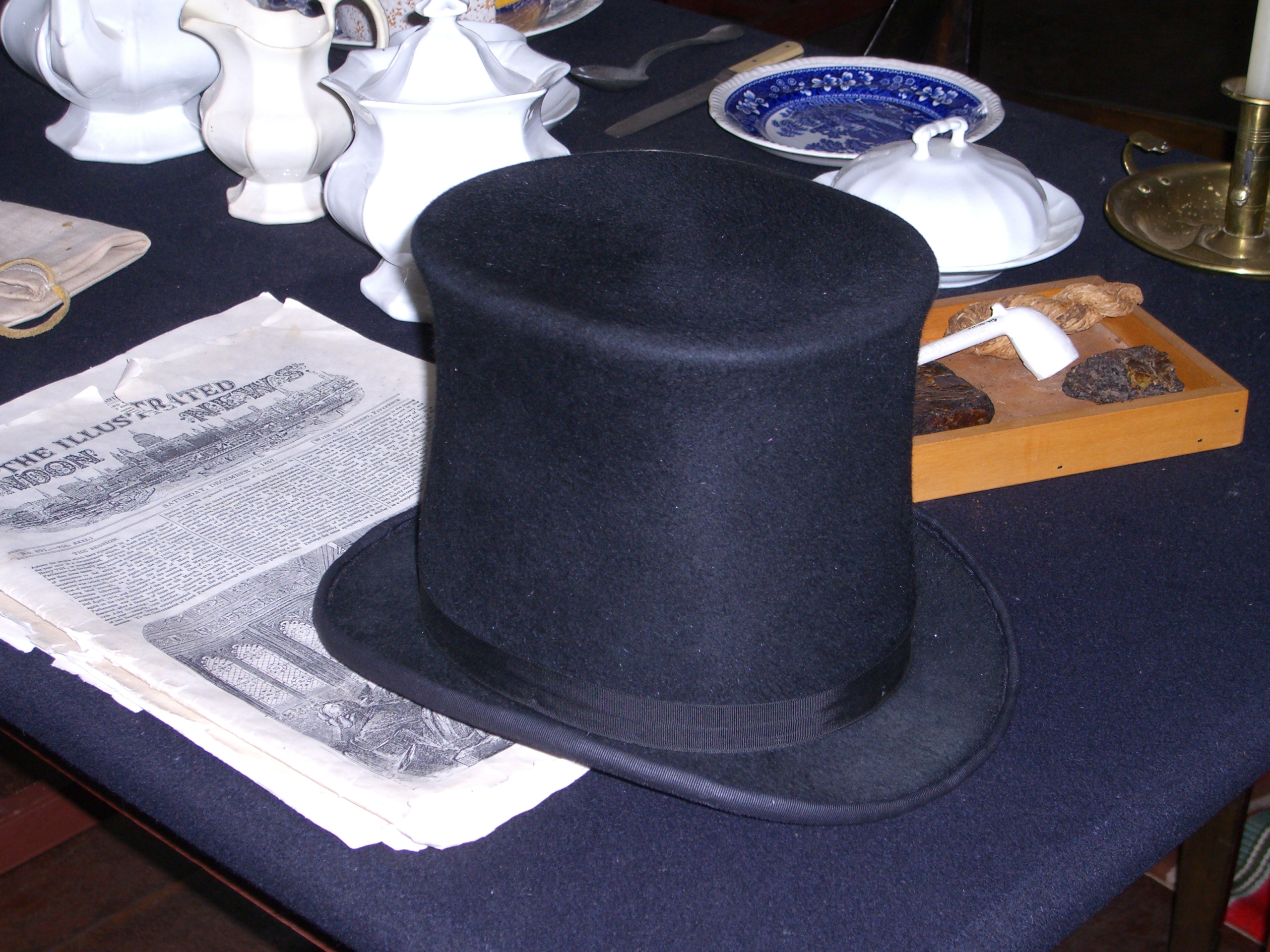
Beaver hat

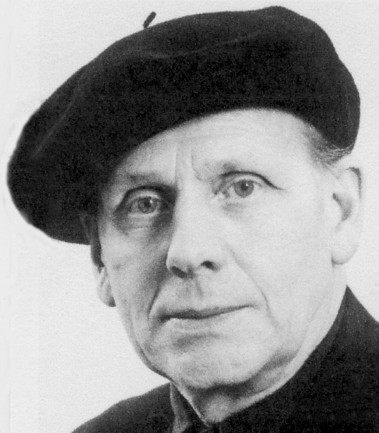
Beret

Boater (also basher, skimmer, cady, katie, somer, or sennit hat)

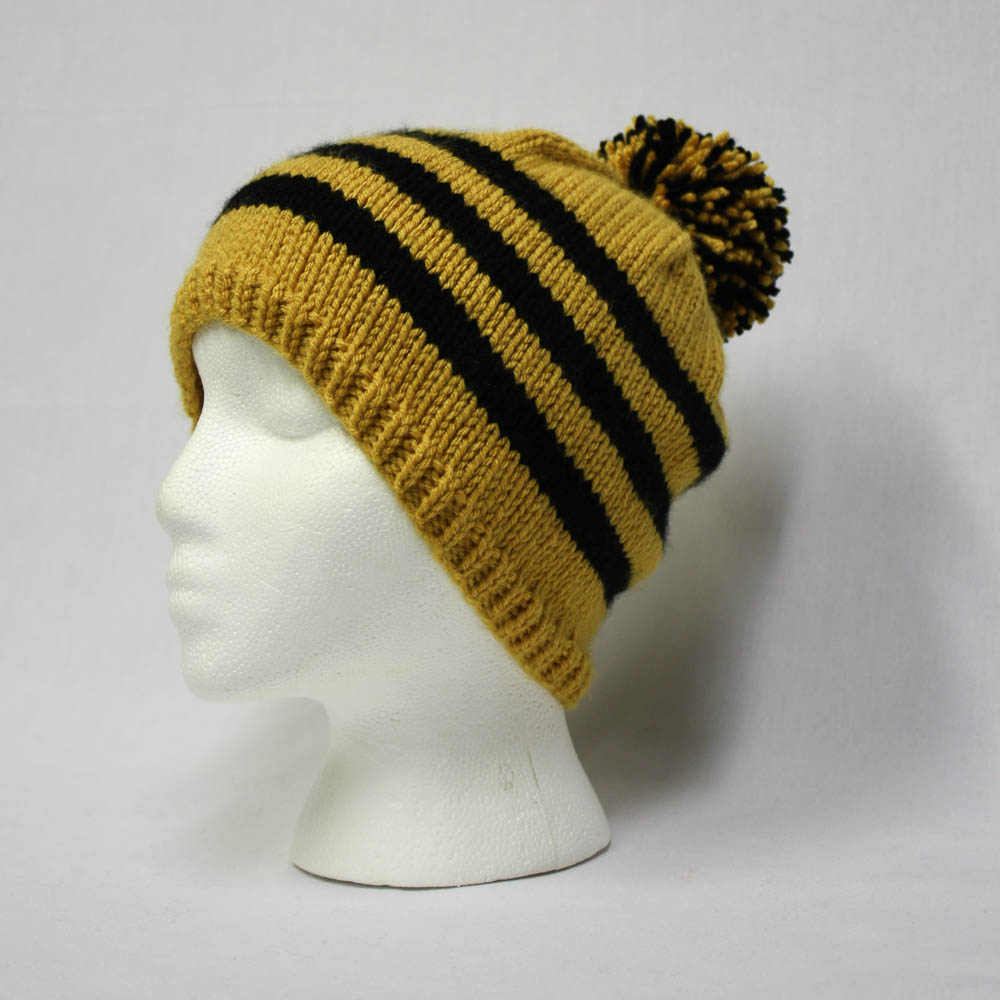
Bobble hat (tuque)

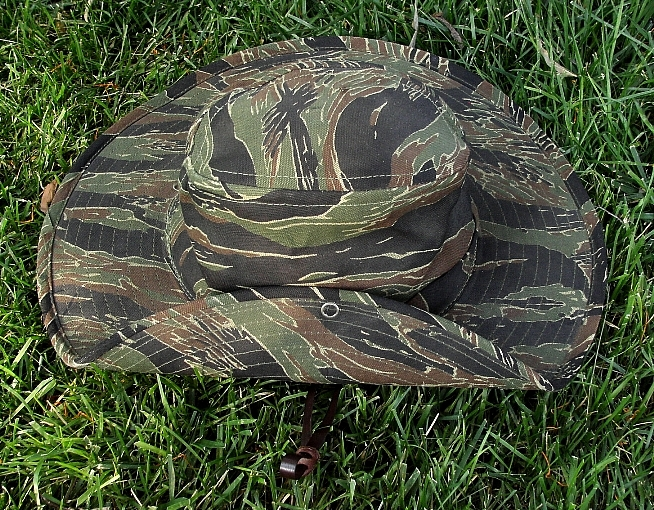
Boonie hat

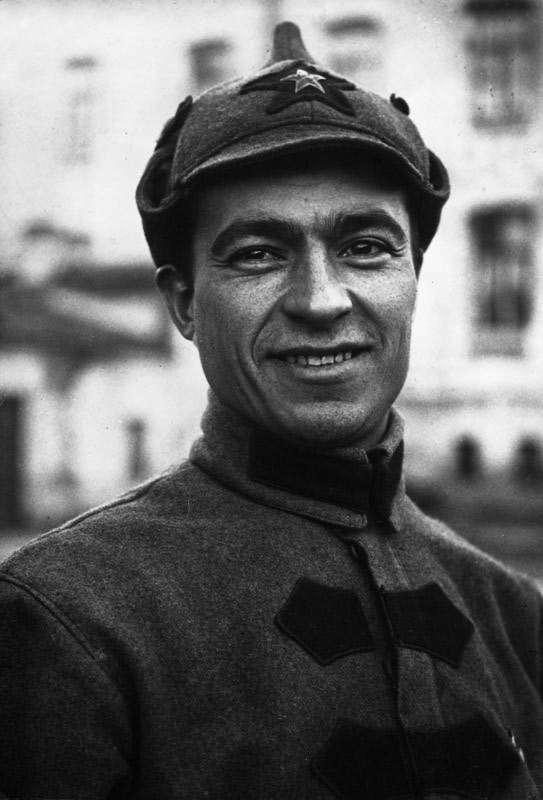
Budenovka

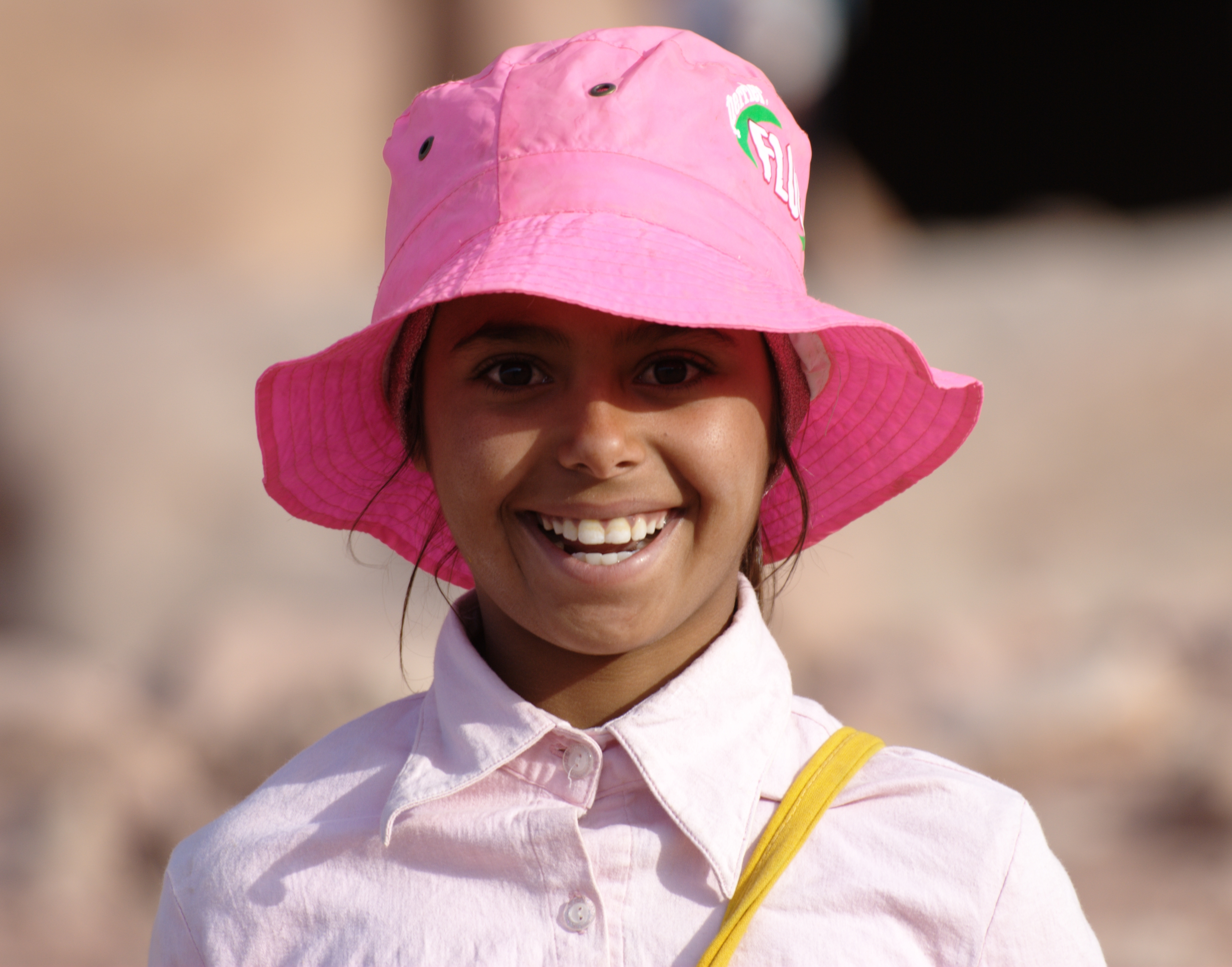
Bucket hat, also fishing hat, ratting hat (UK) or Dixie Cup hat (US)

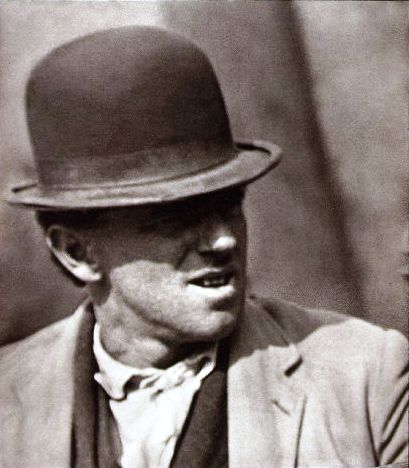
Bowler or Derby

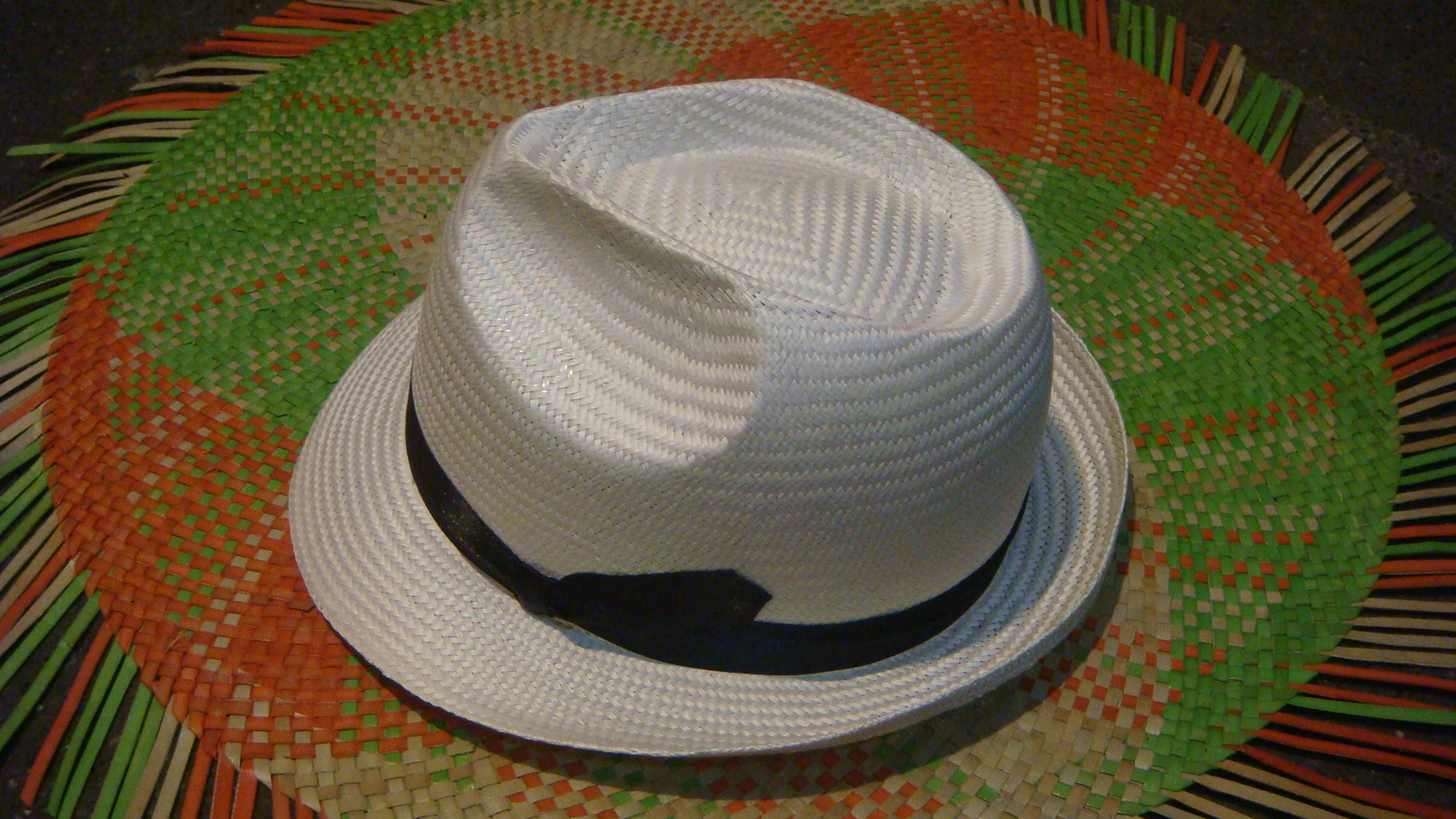
Buntal hat

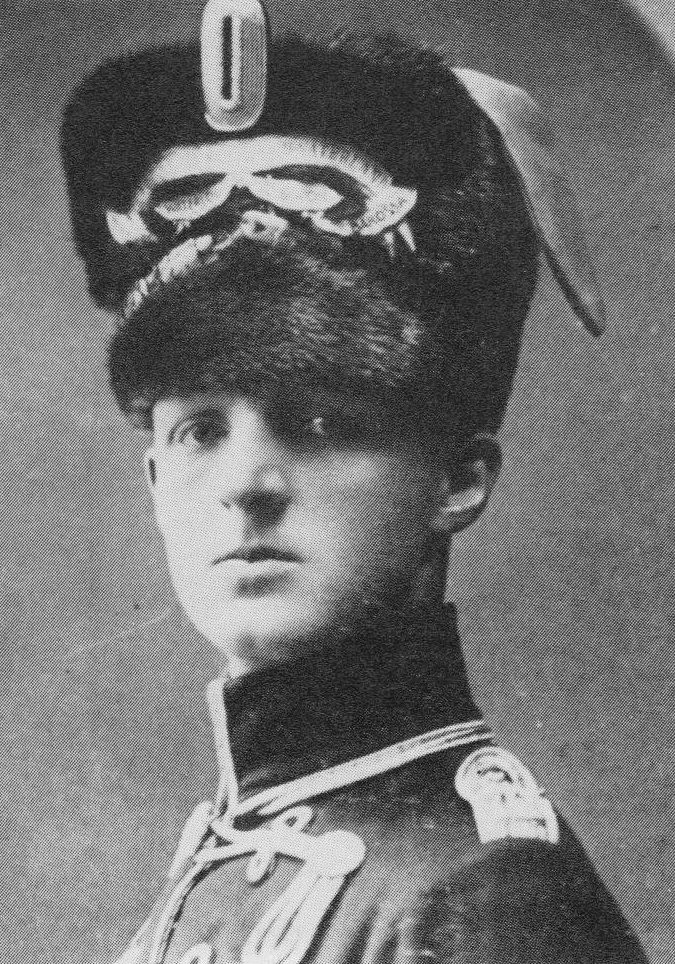
Busby, confused with Bearskin (this is not a British hussar 'busby' but a German kolpak)

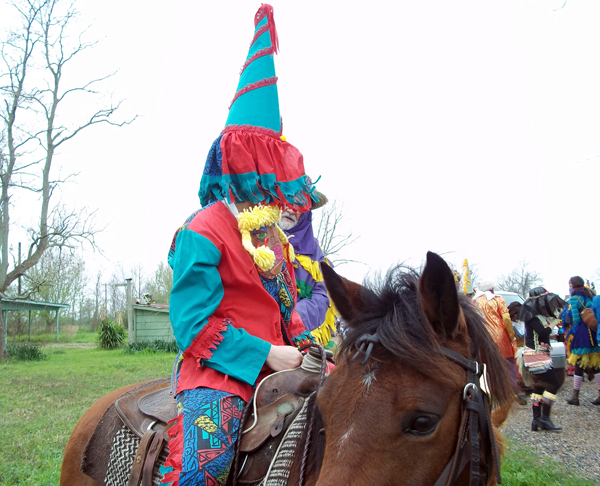
Capuchon

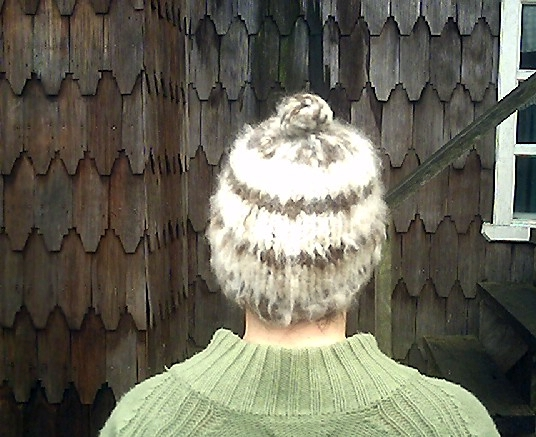
Chilote cap

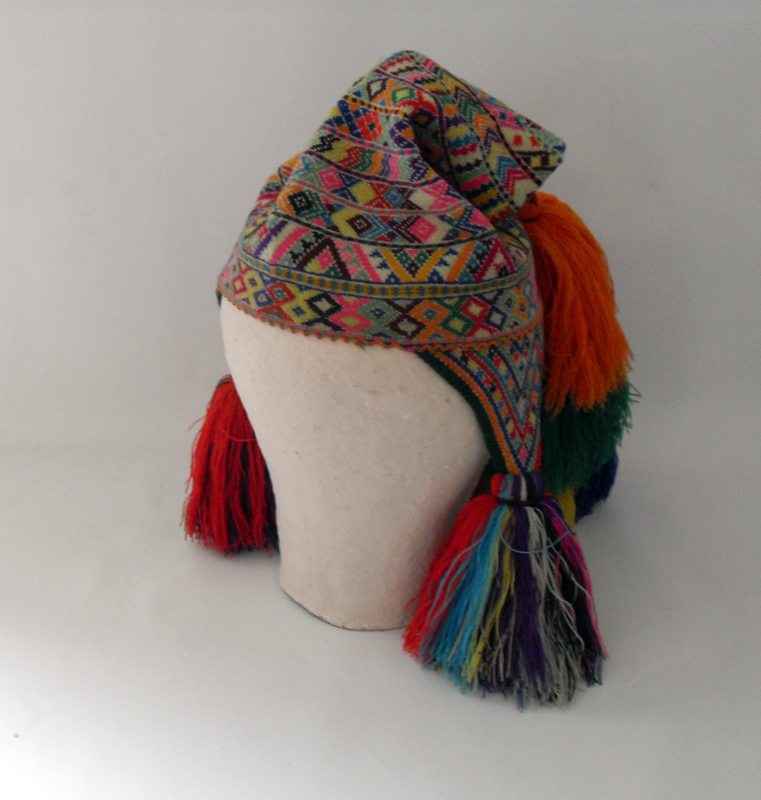
Chullo

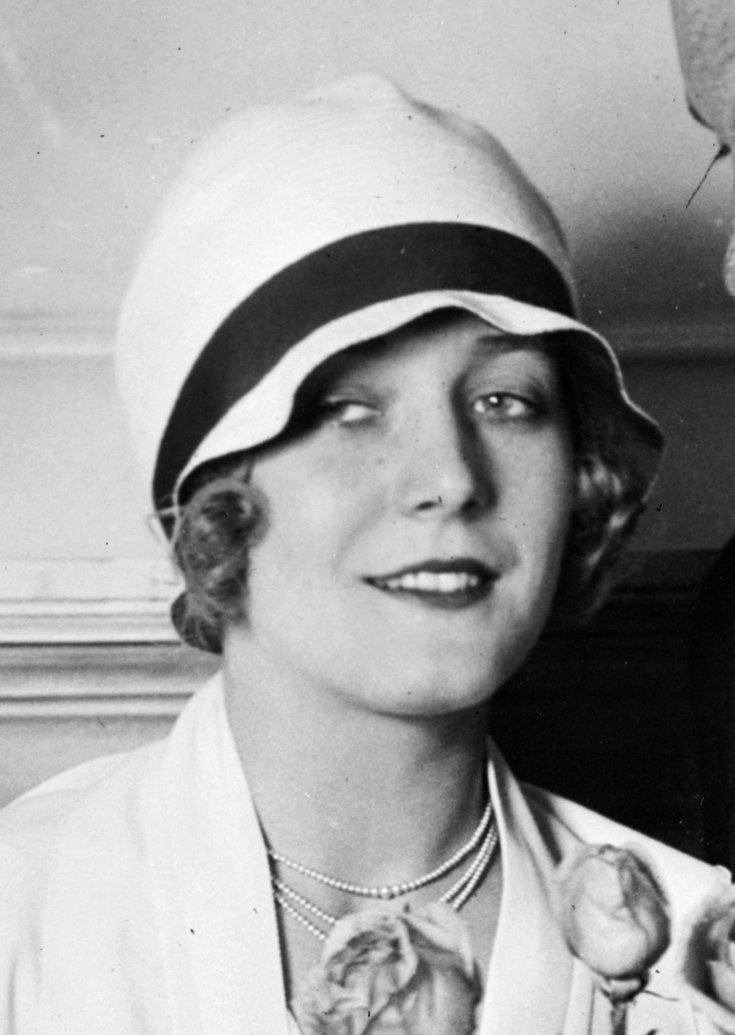
Cloche hat

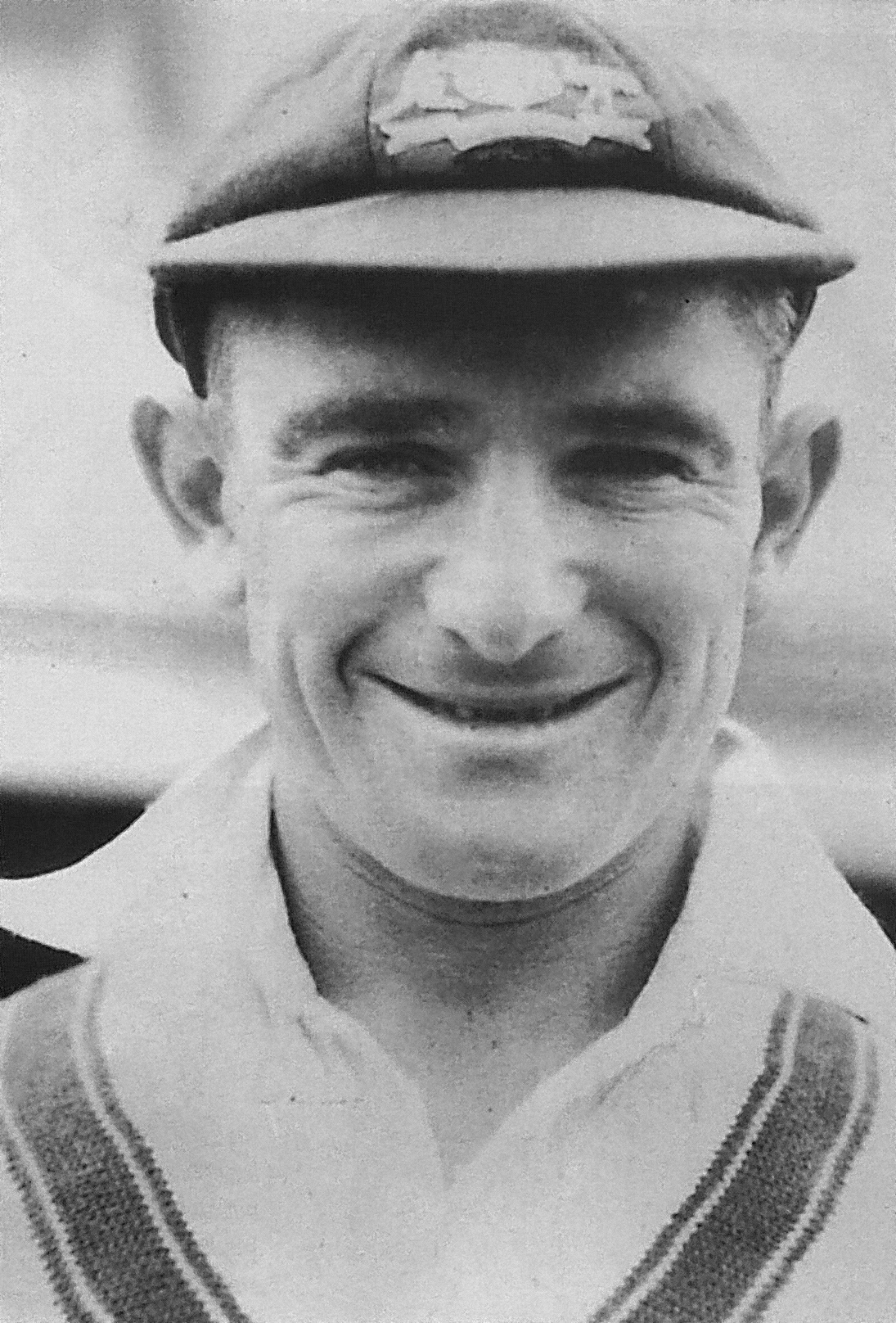
Cricket cap

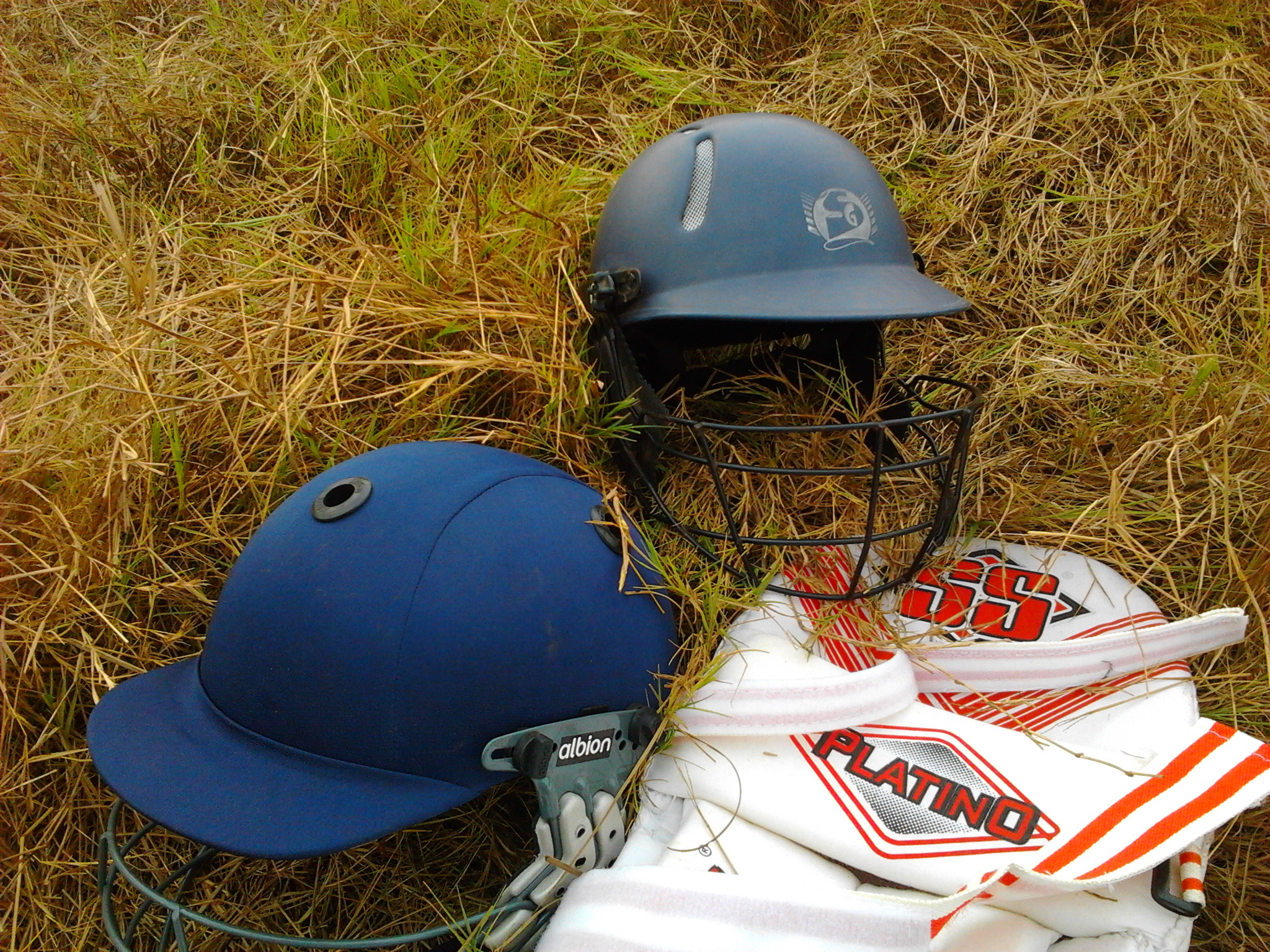
Cricket helmet

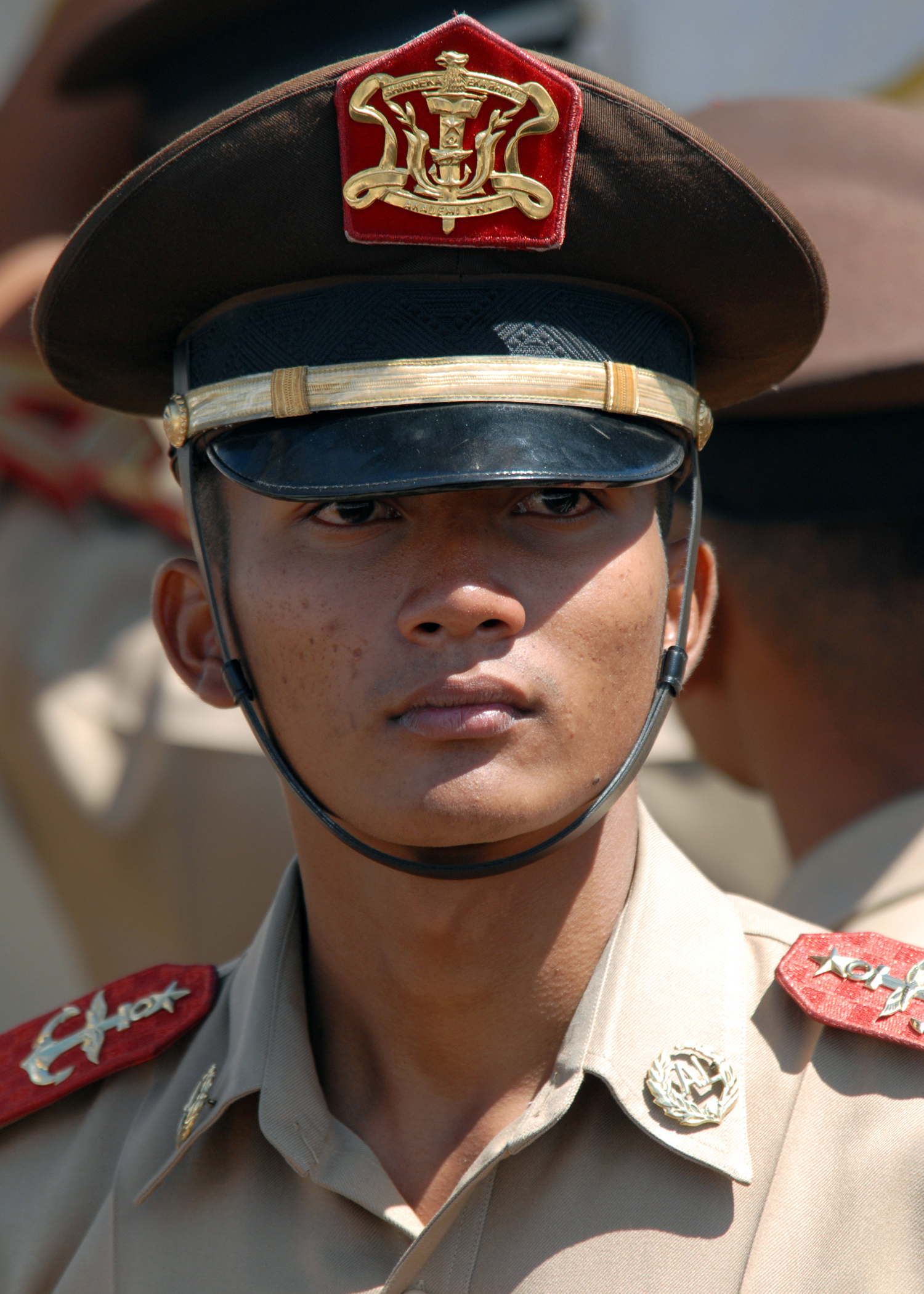
Combination cap, also "service cap" or peaked cap

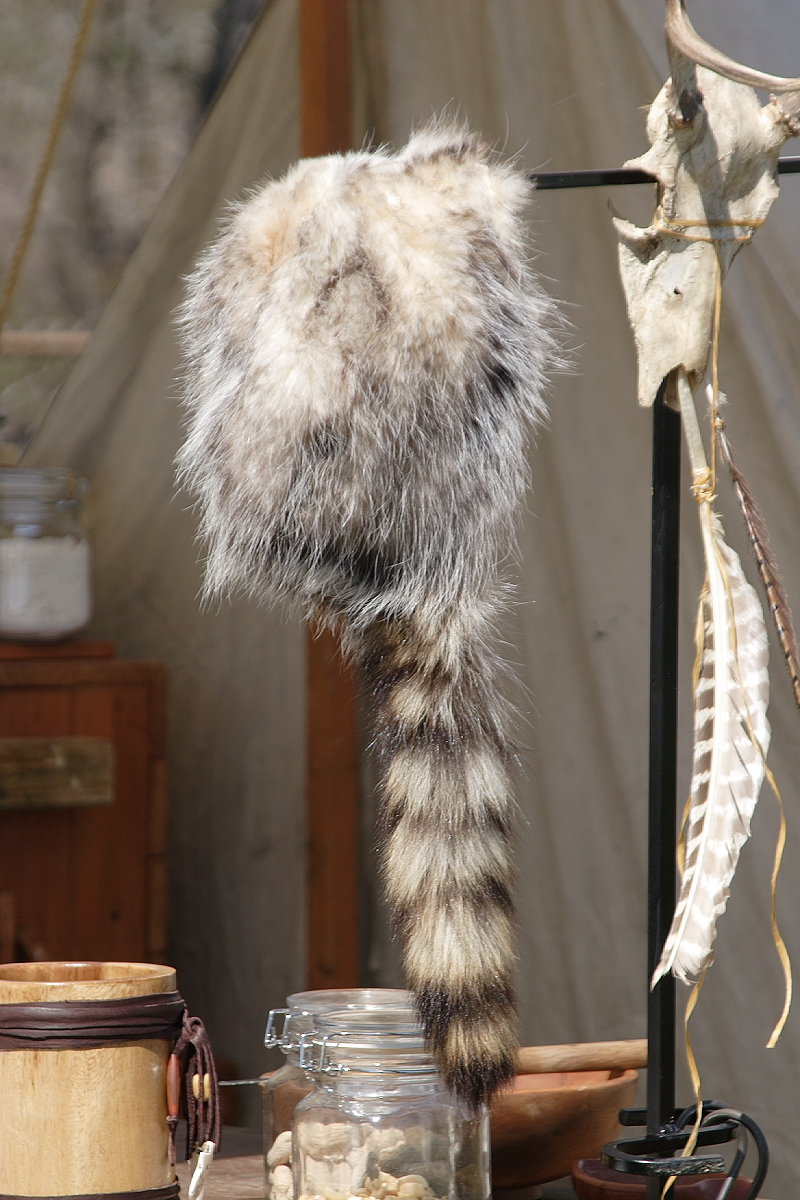
Coonskin cap

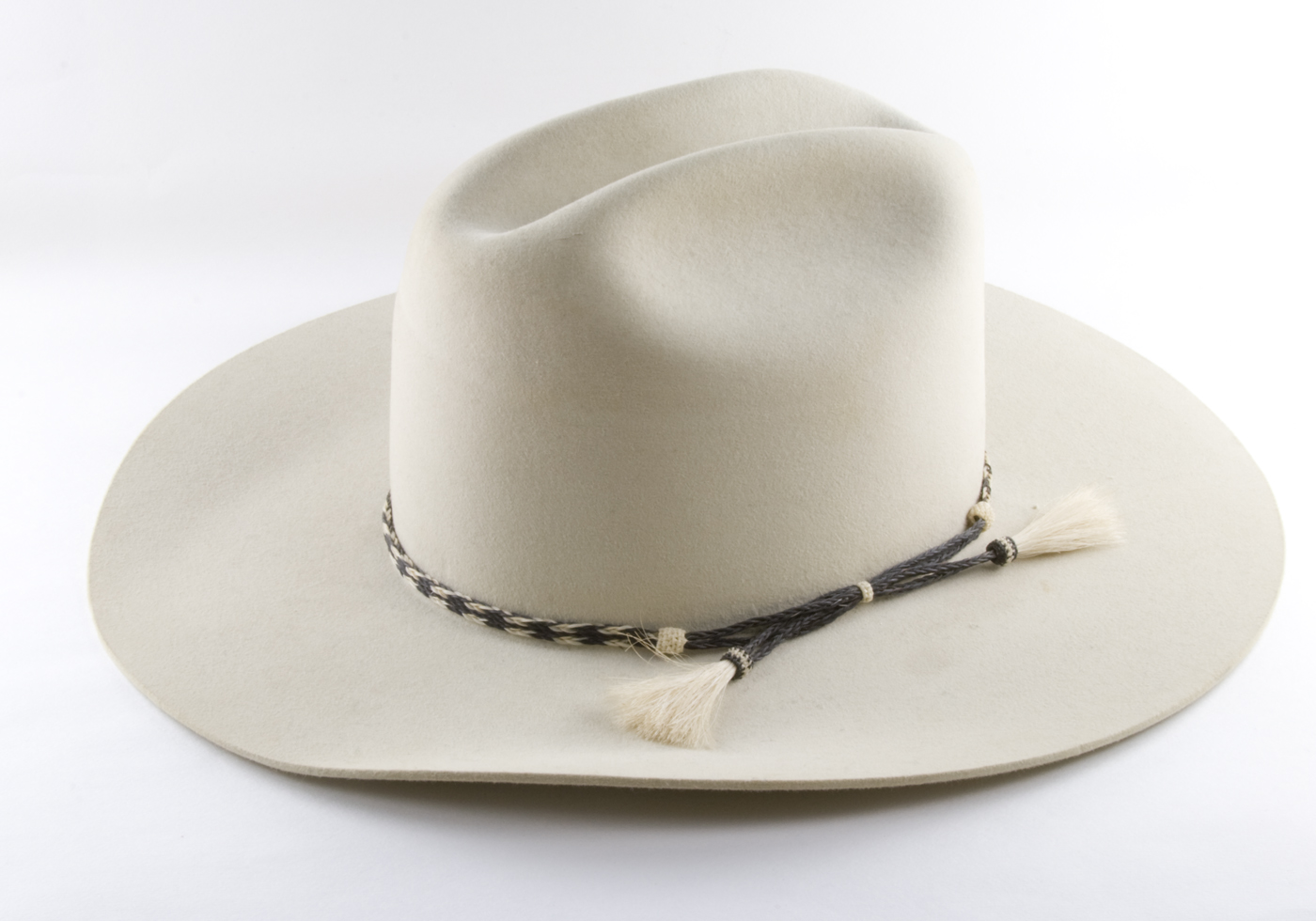
Cowboy hat, sometimes "ten gallon hat"

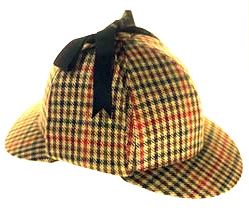
Deerstalker

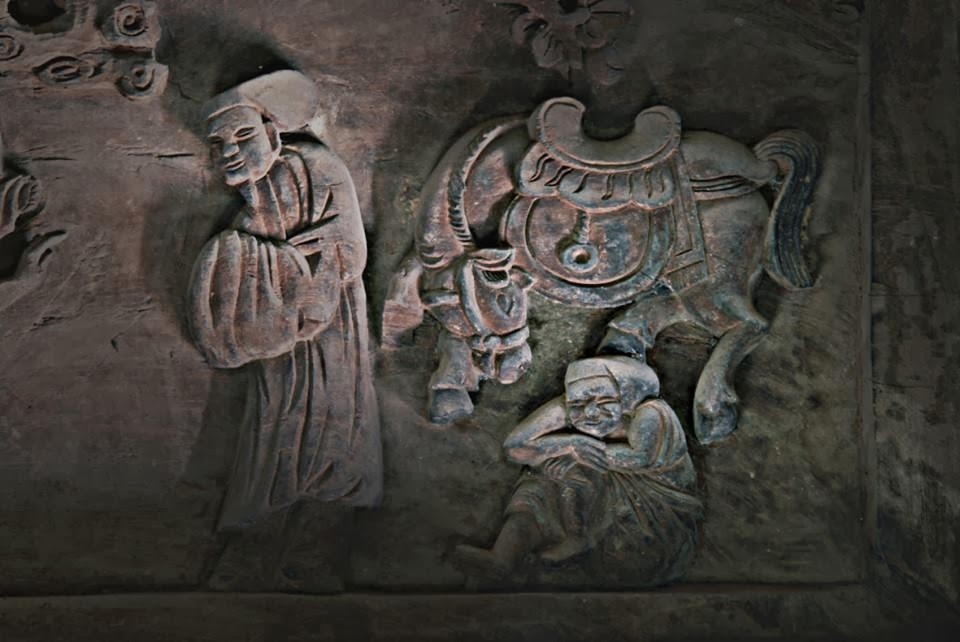
Đinh Tự

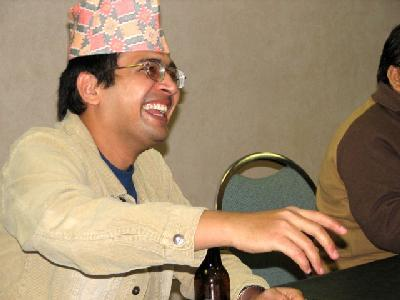
Dhaka topi, also "Nepali Hat"

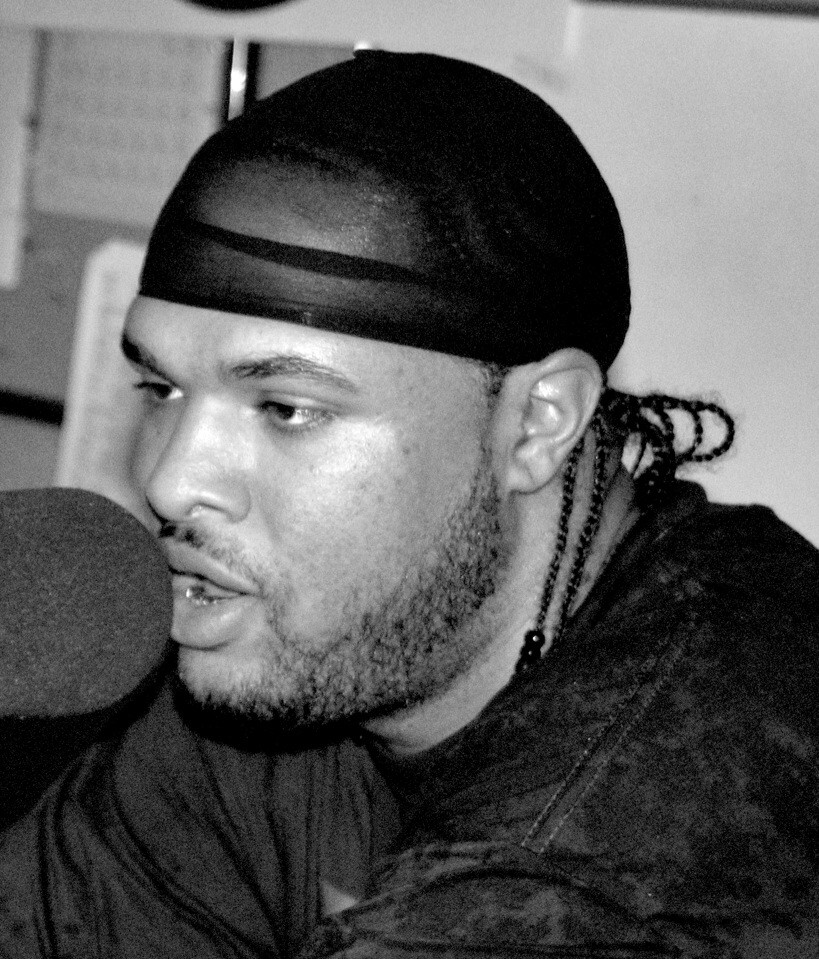
Durag

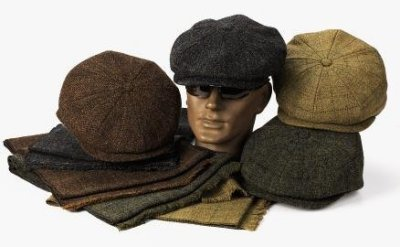
Eight-point cap, also Gatsby cap, newsboy cap, bakerboy cap

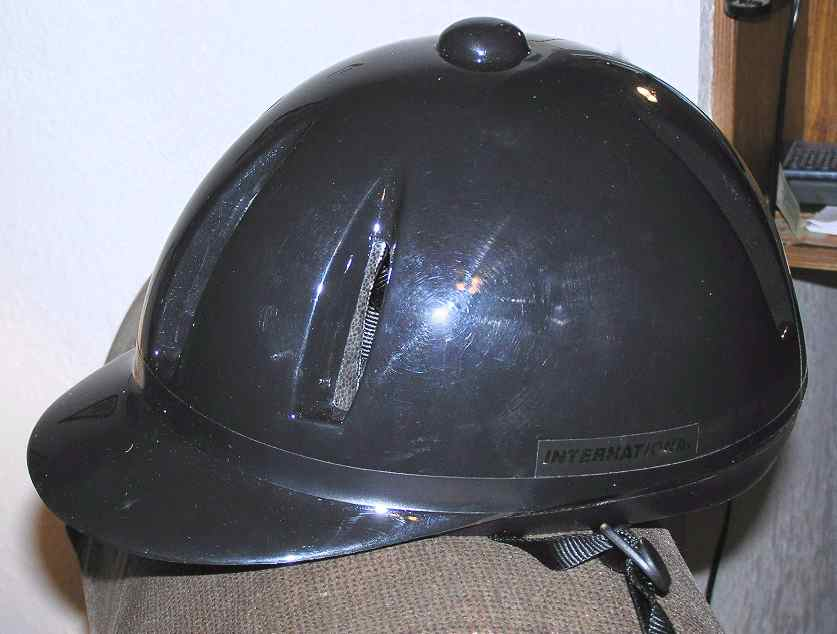
Equestrian helmet

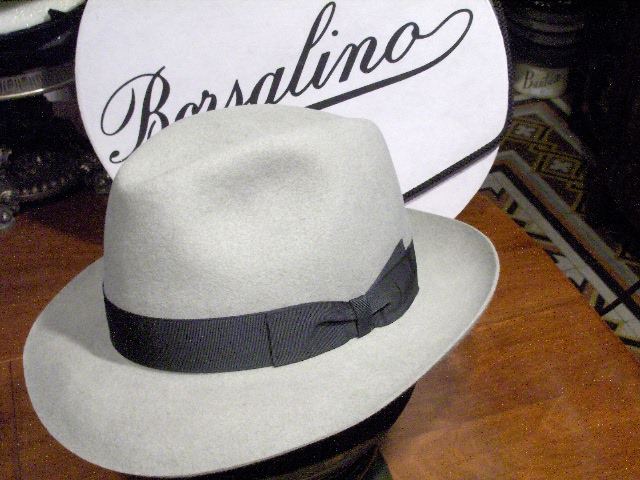
Fedora

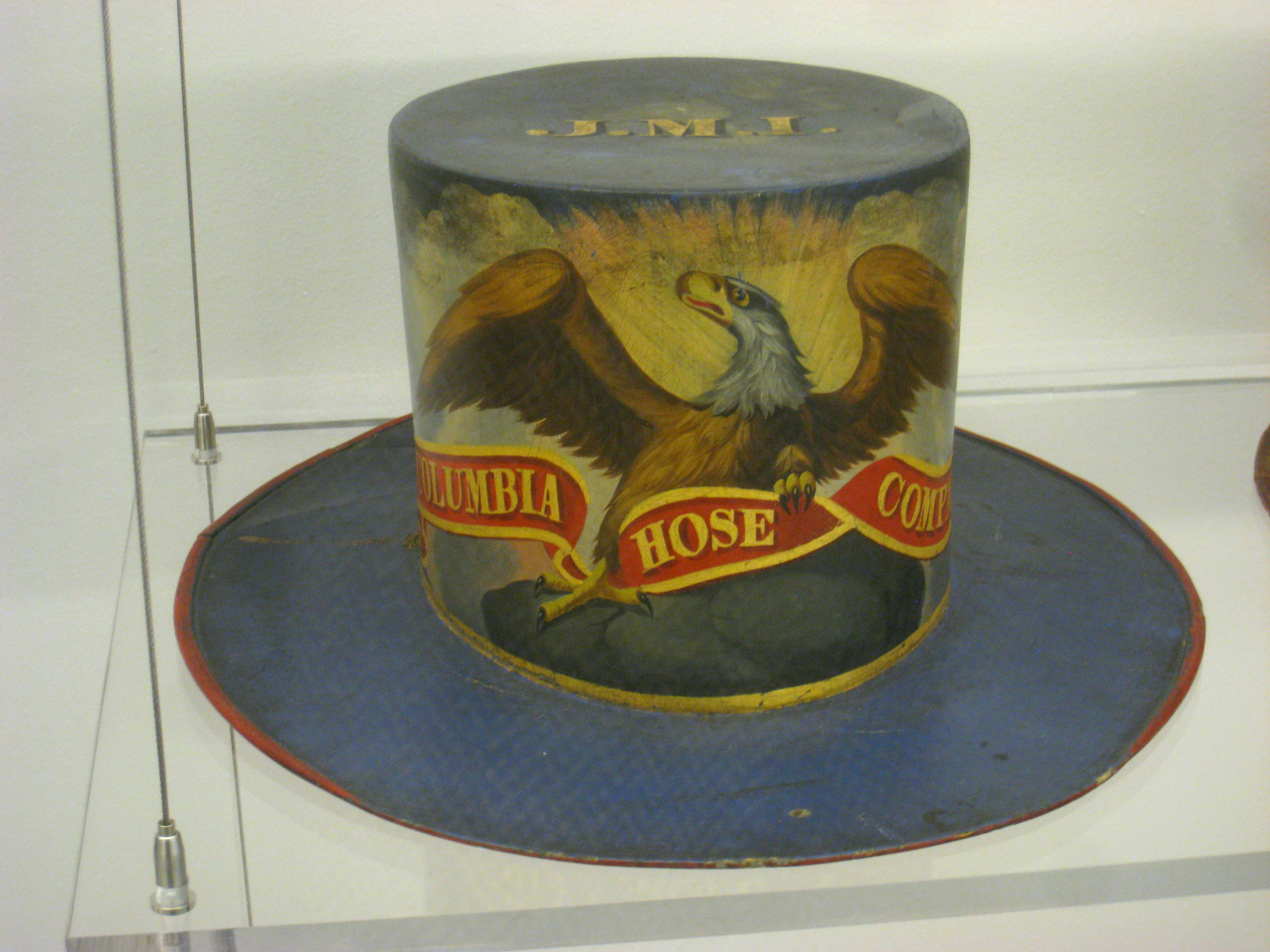
Fire hat in the National Museum of American History

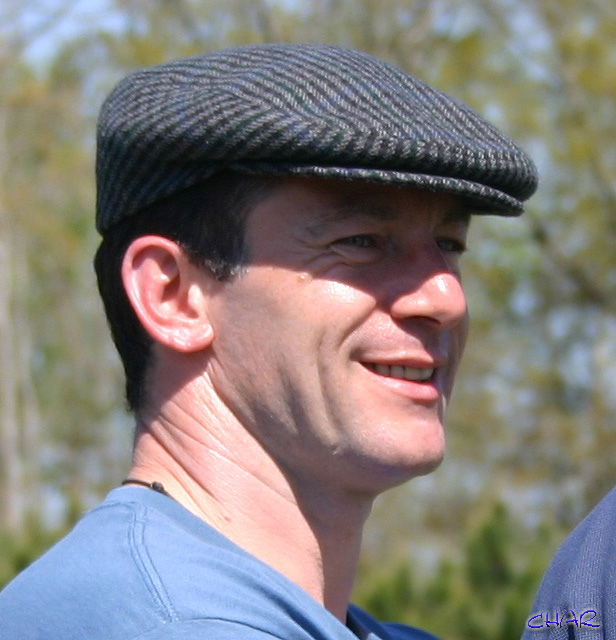
Flat cap, also paddy cap, bunnet, cloth cap, driver cap, golf cap, or Windsor cap

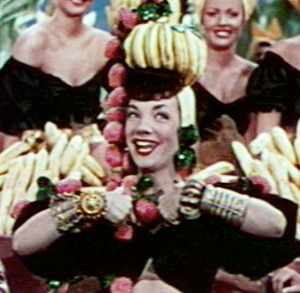
Fruit hat

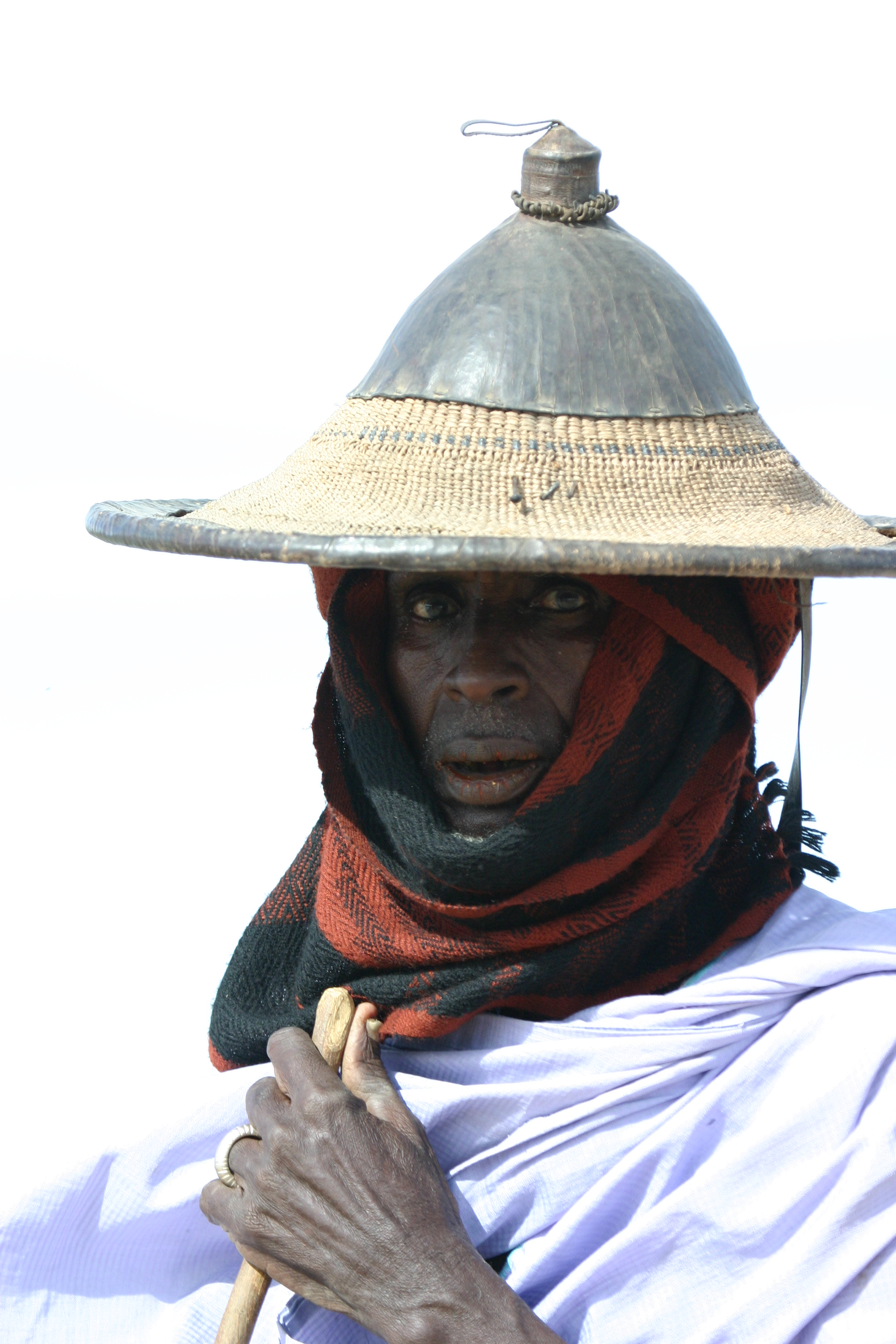
Fulani hat

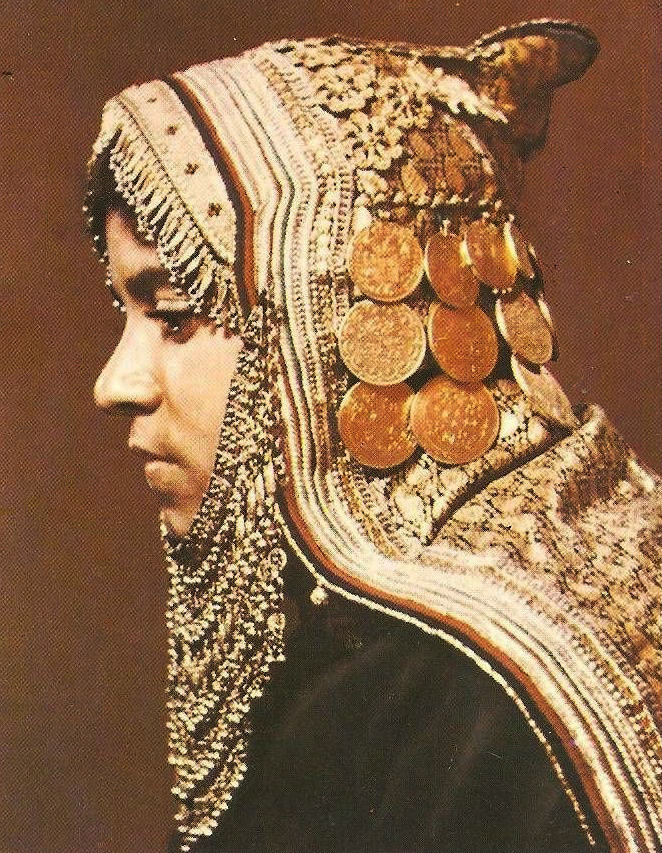
Gargush

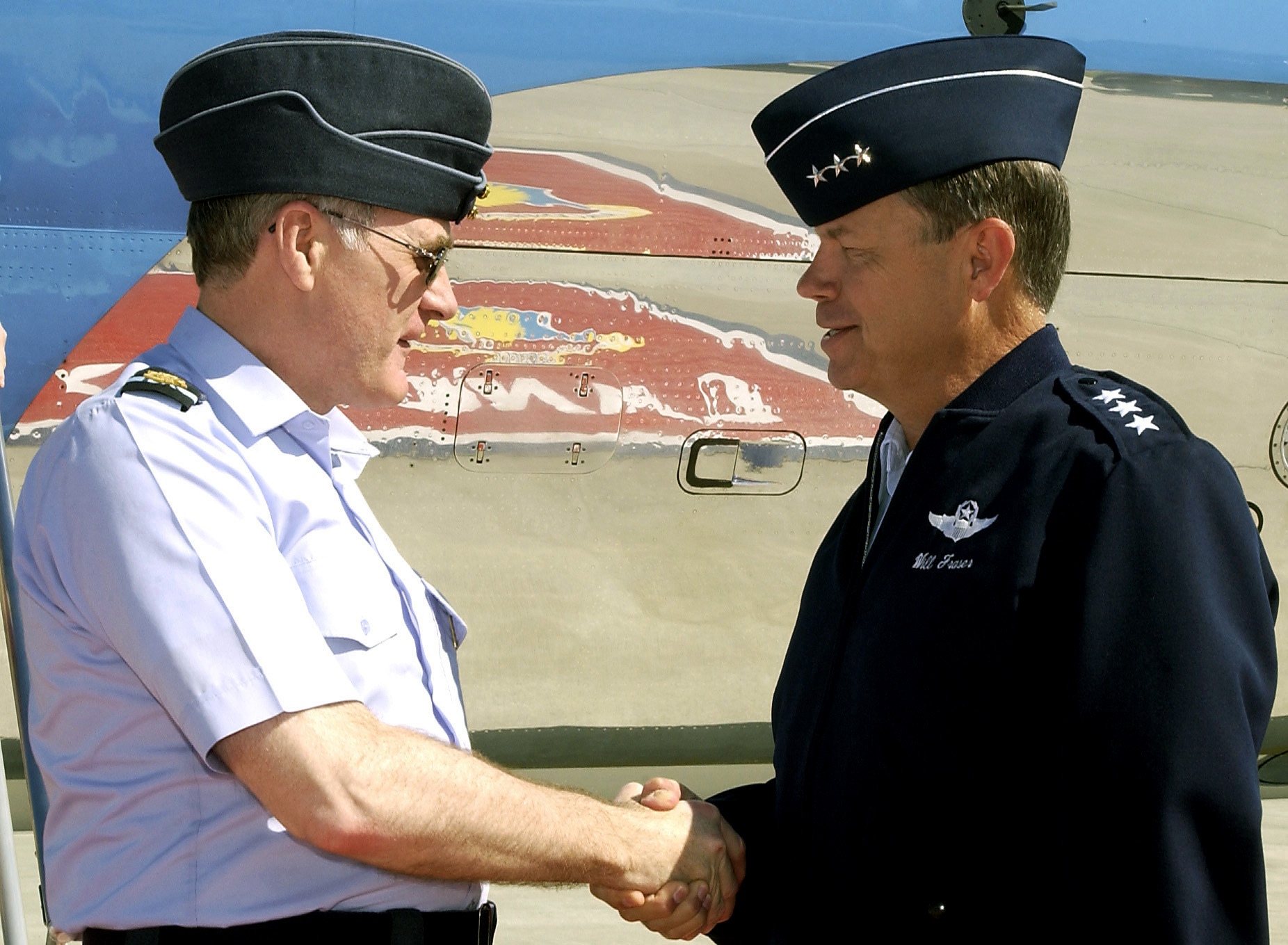
Garrison cap, also "flight cap", "side cap" or "overseas cap"

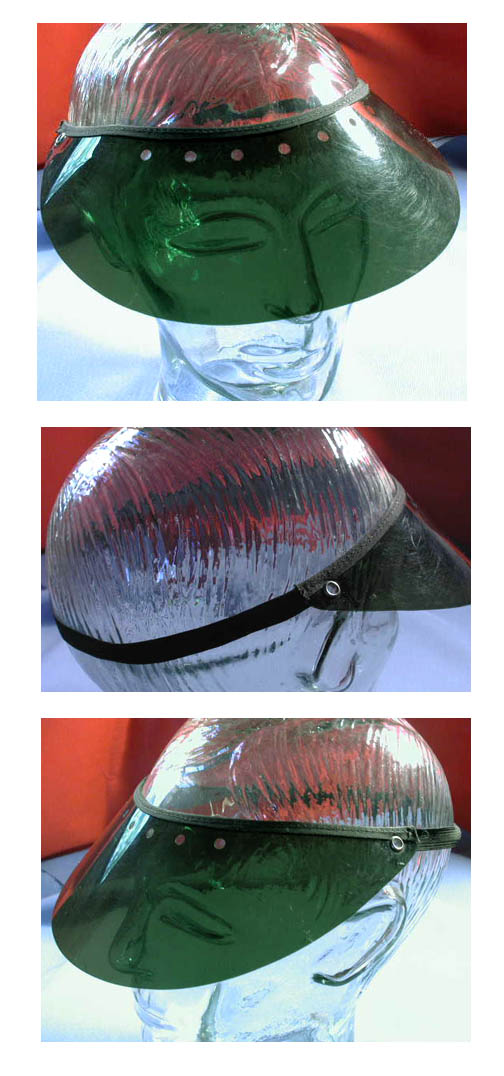
Green eyeshade

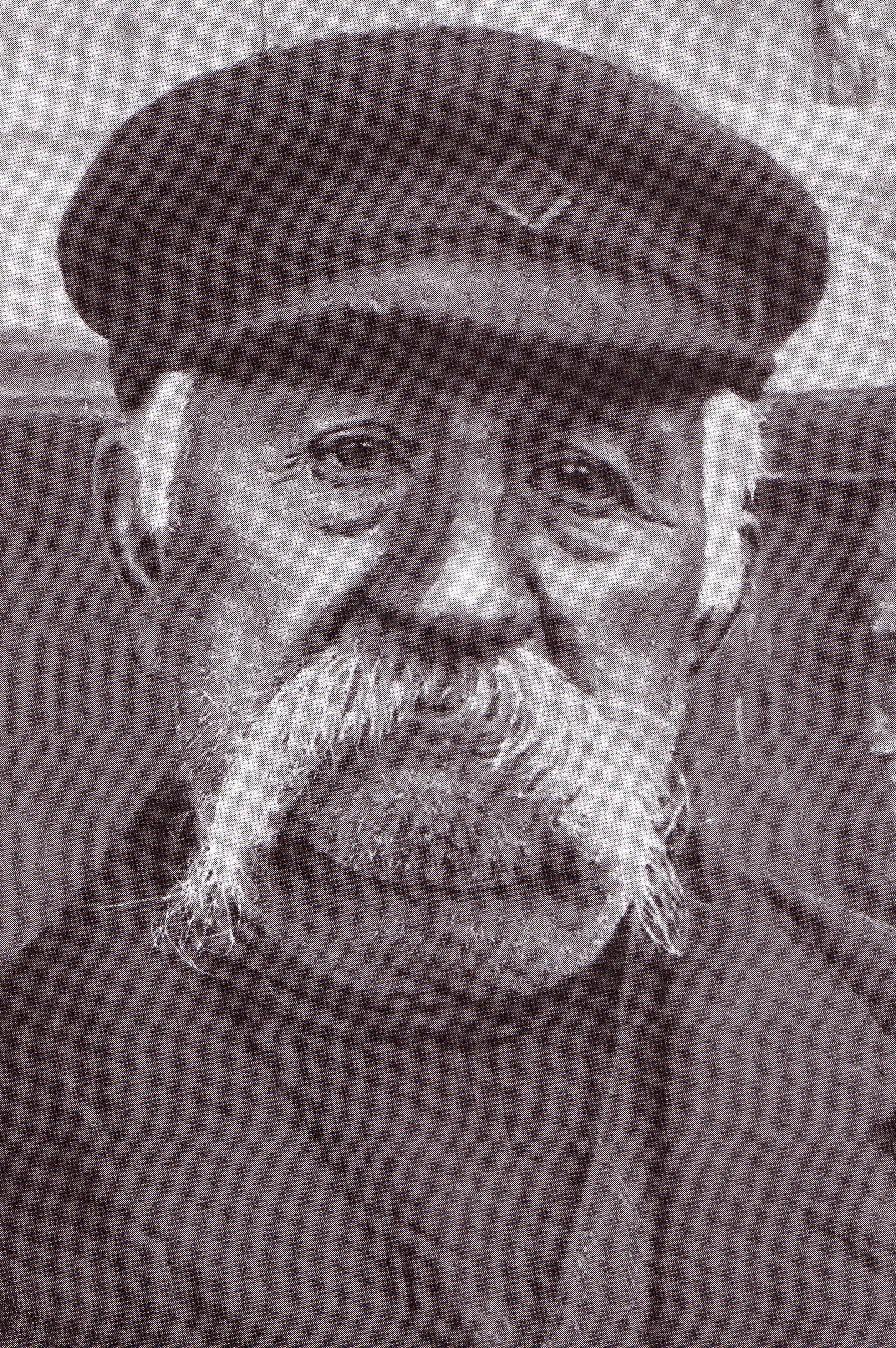
Greek fisherman's cap, also captain's cap

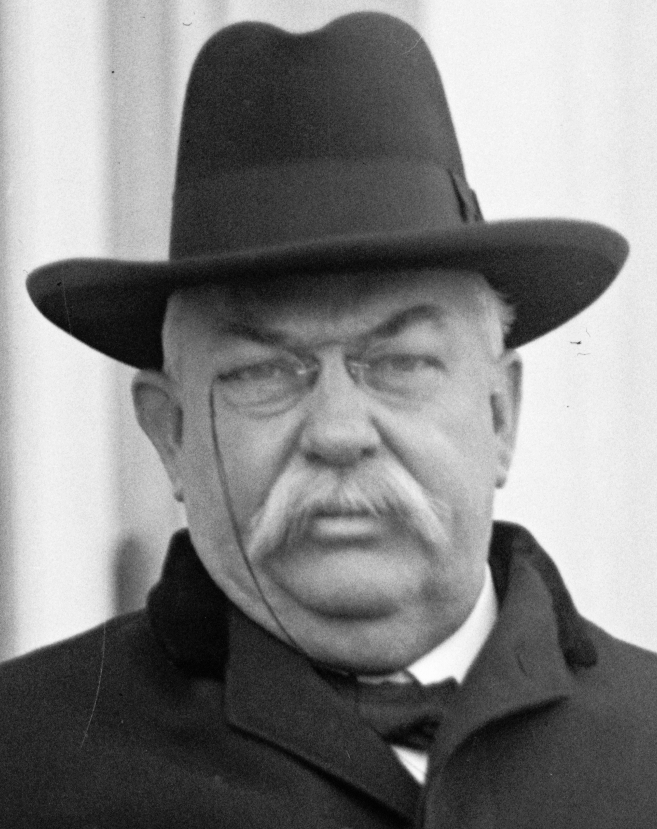
Homburg

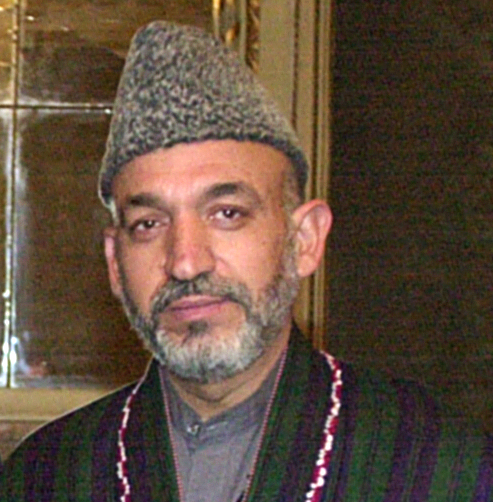
Karakul

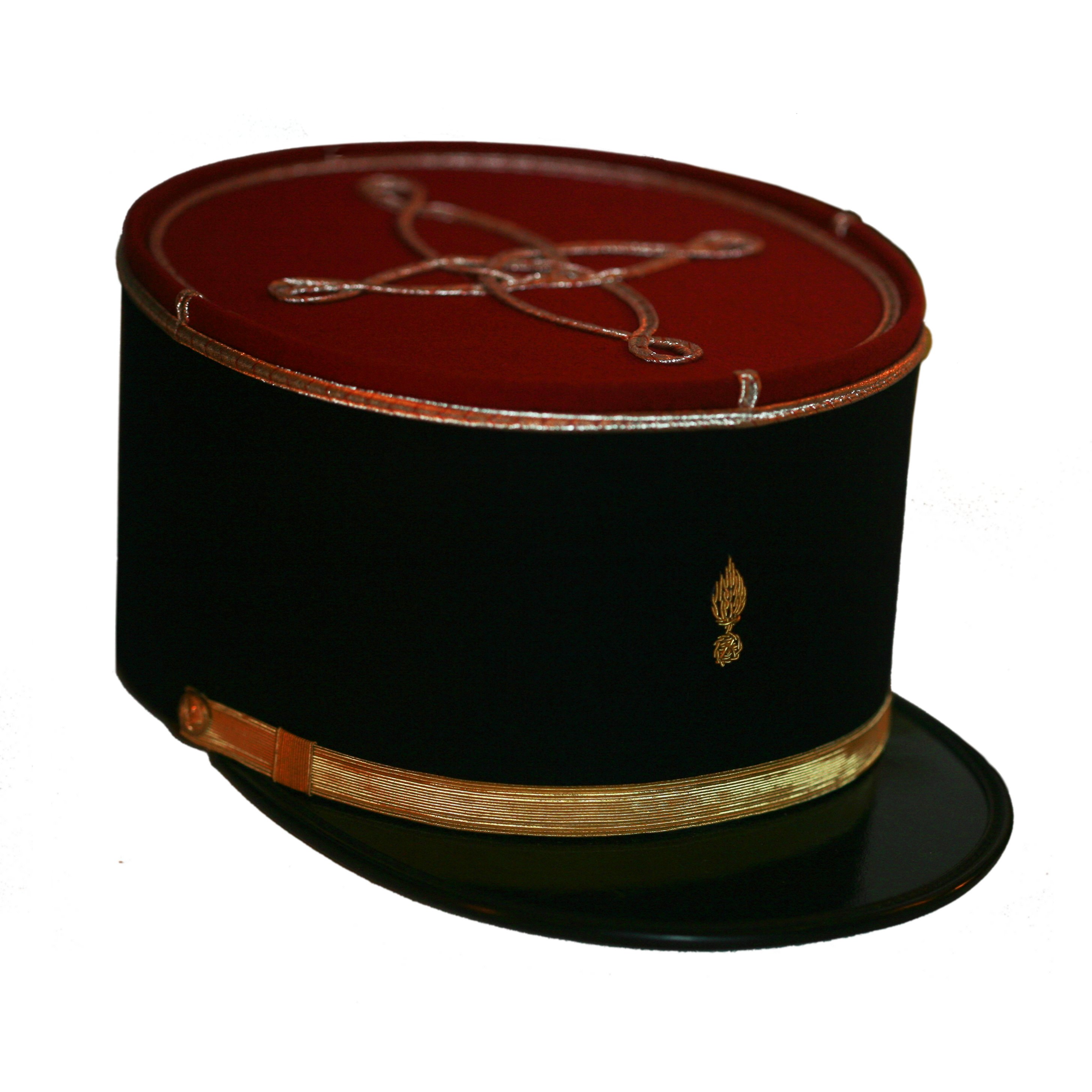
Kepi

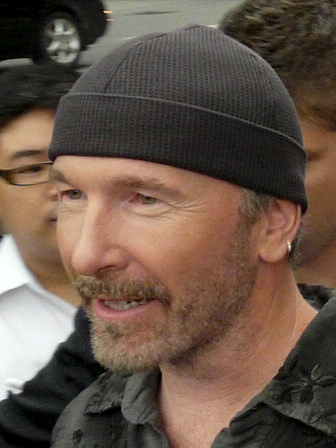
Knit cap, also knit hat, stocking cap, toboggan, toque, watch or ski cap

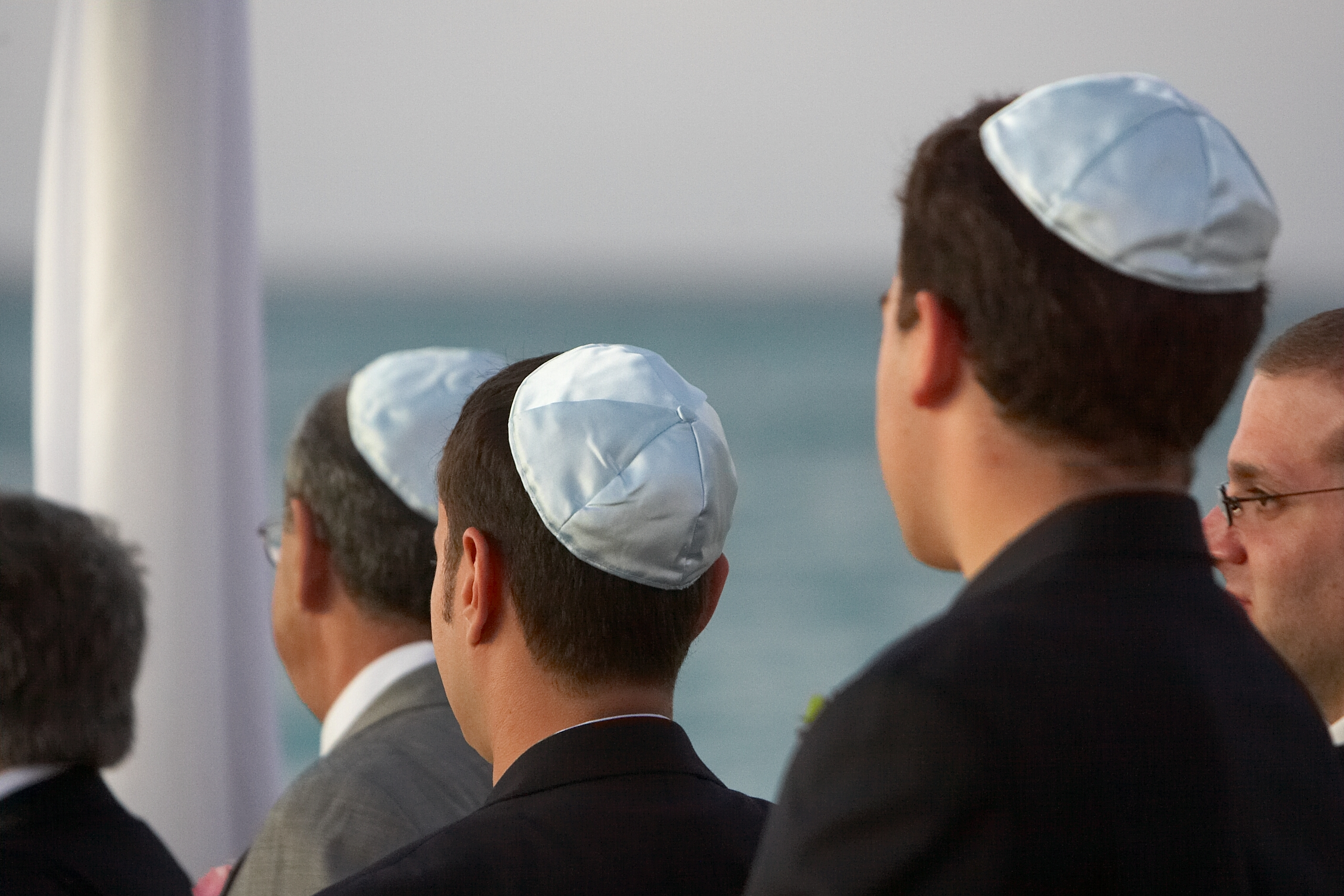
Kippah, also kippa, yarmulke, or skullcap

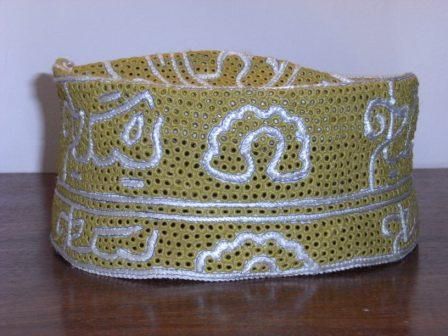
Kofia, worn in East Africa

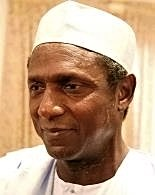
Kufi, including the "Zulu crown".

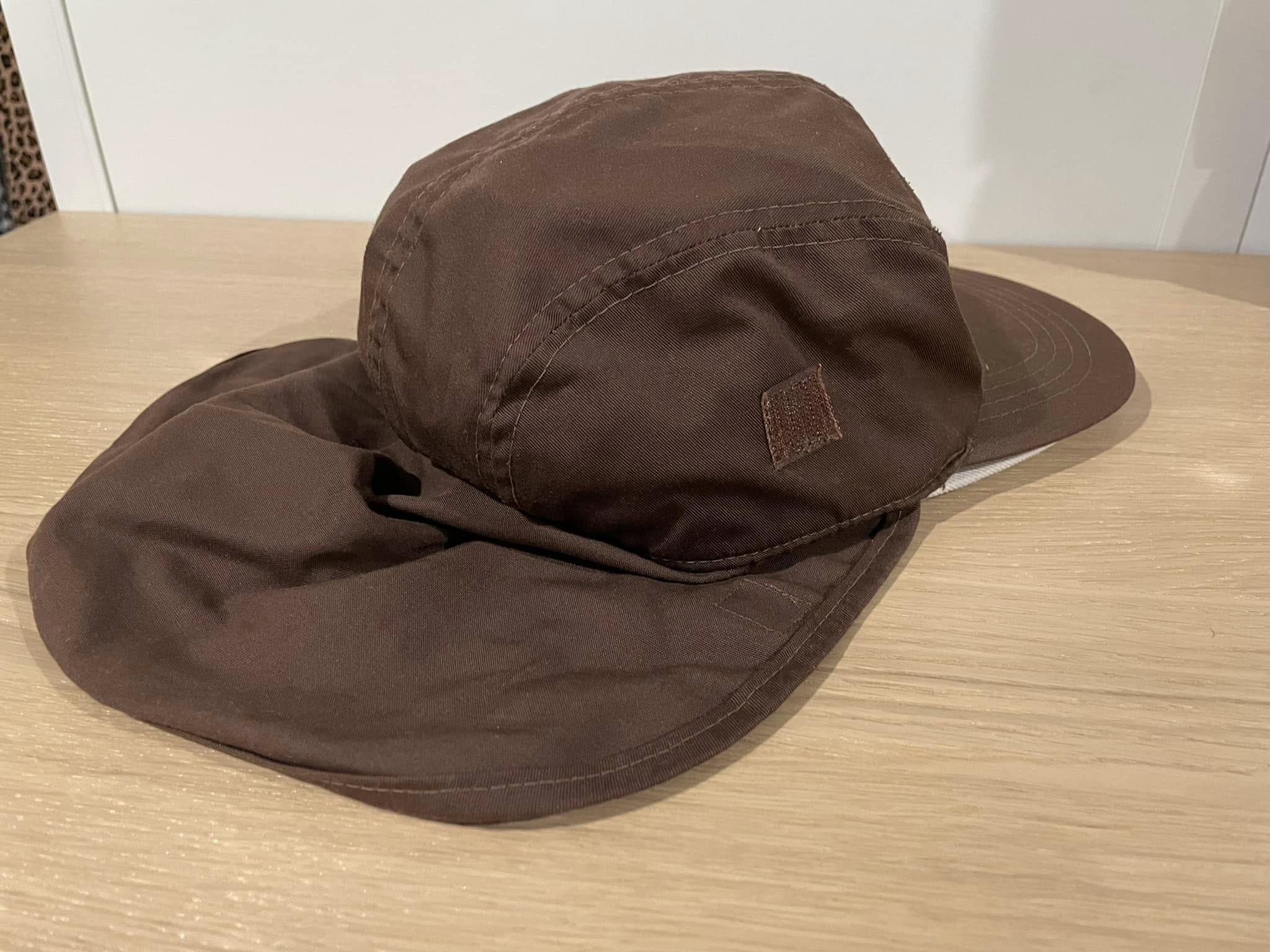
Legionnaire

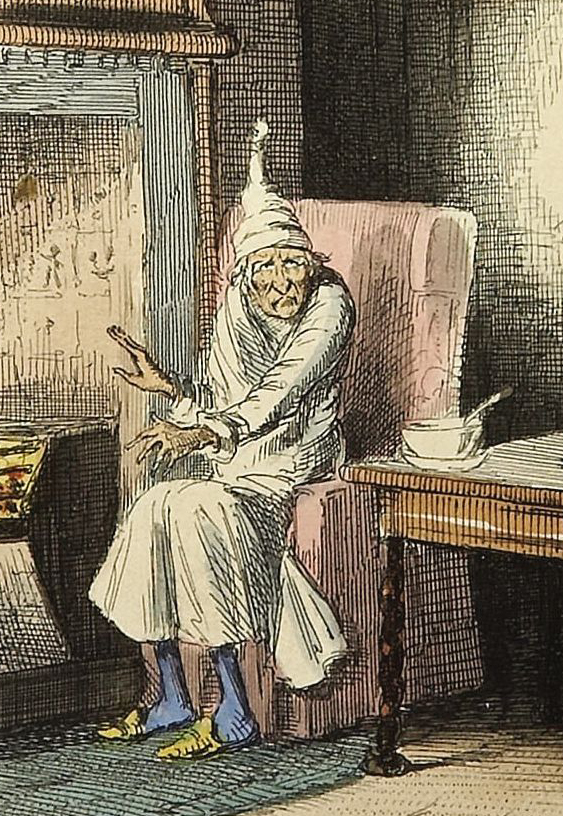
Nightcap

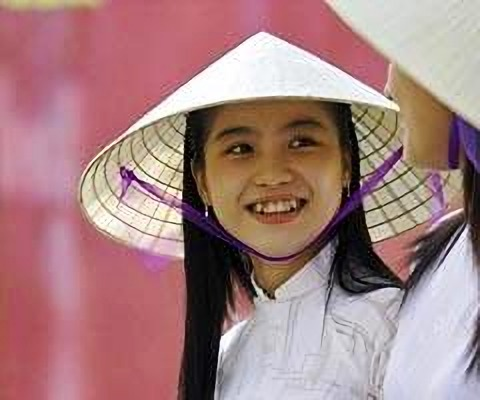
Nón lá

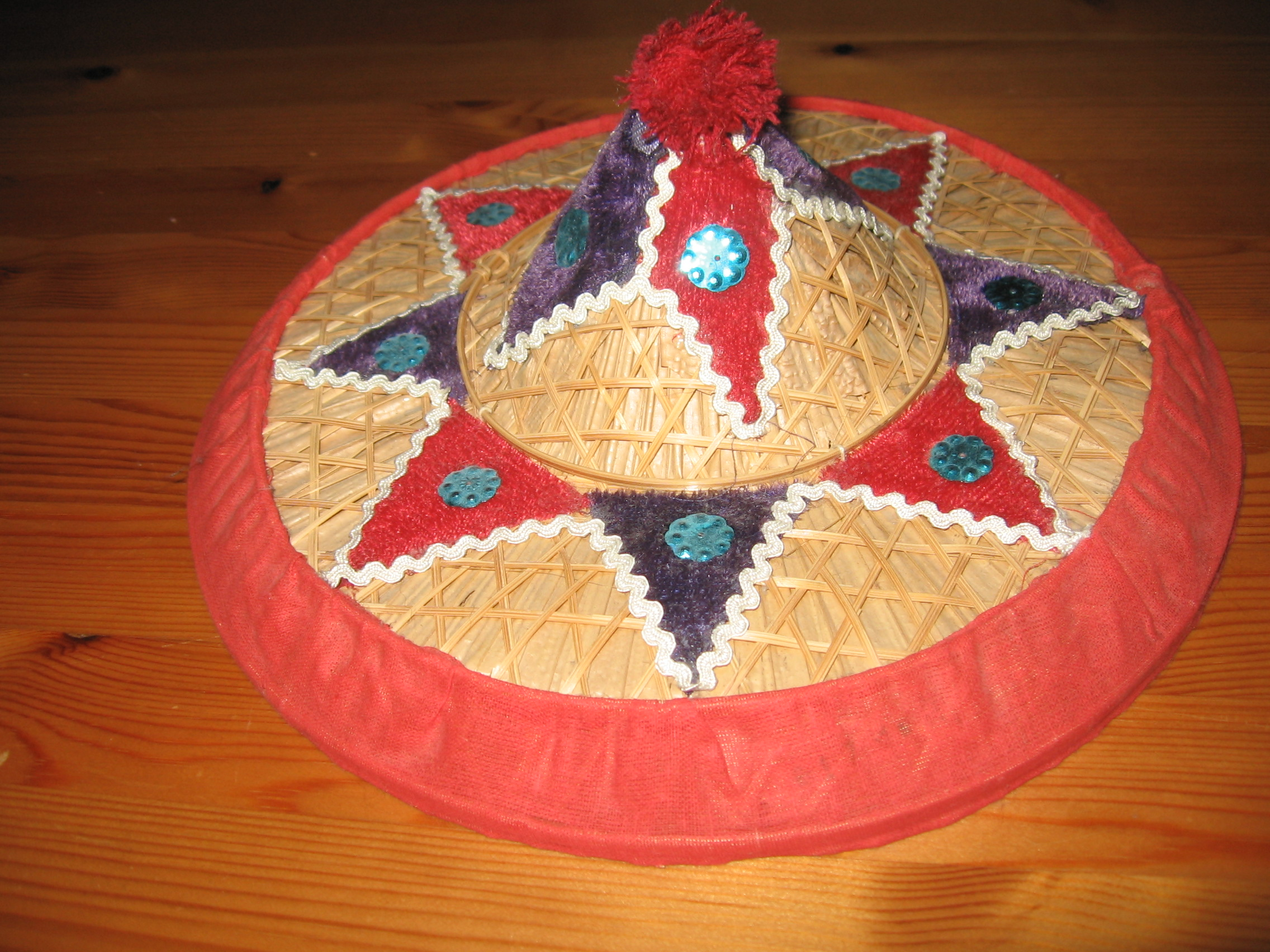
Jaapi

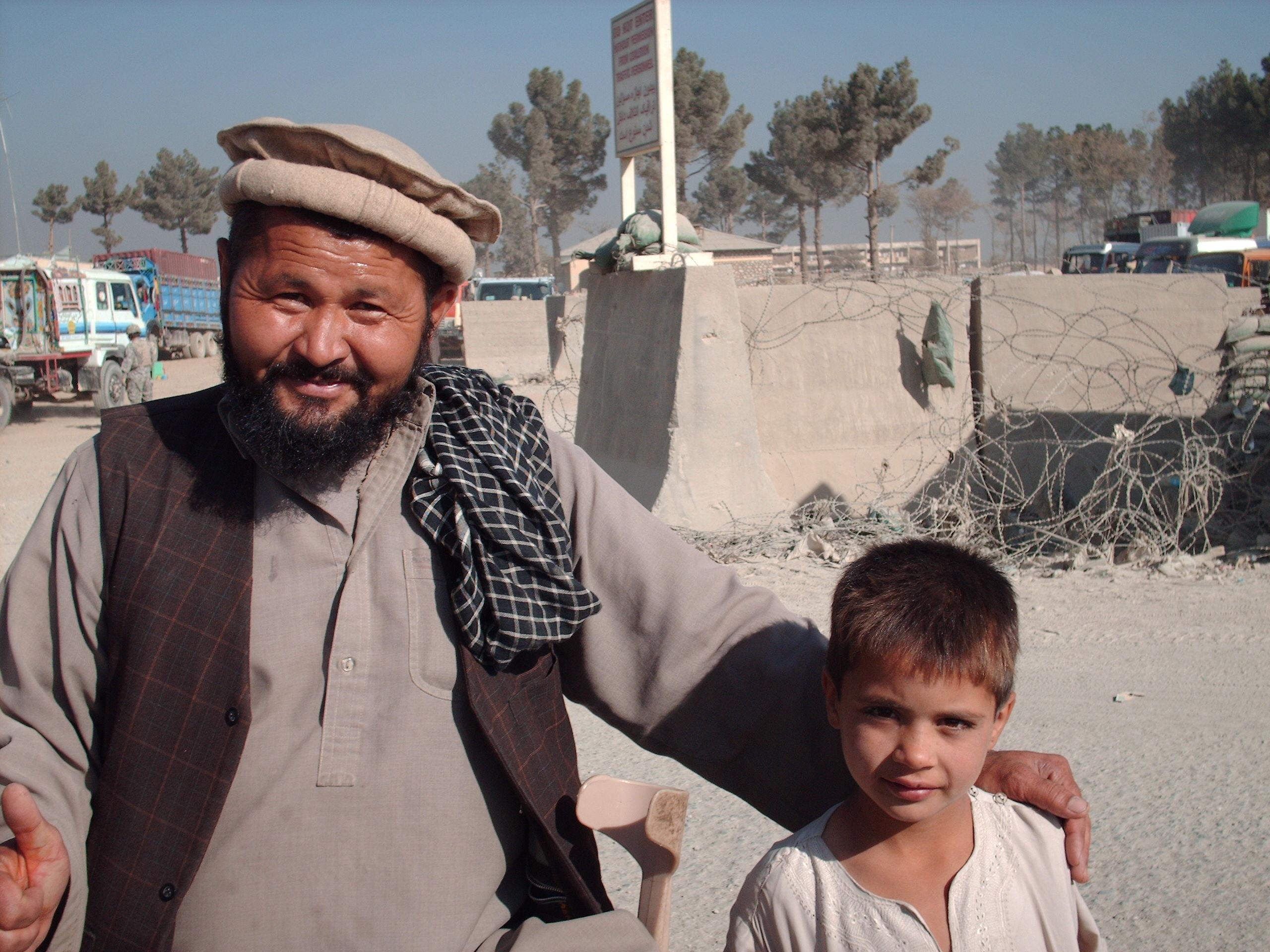
Pakol

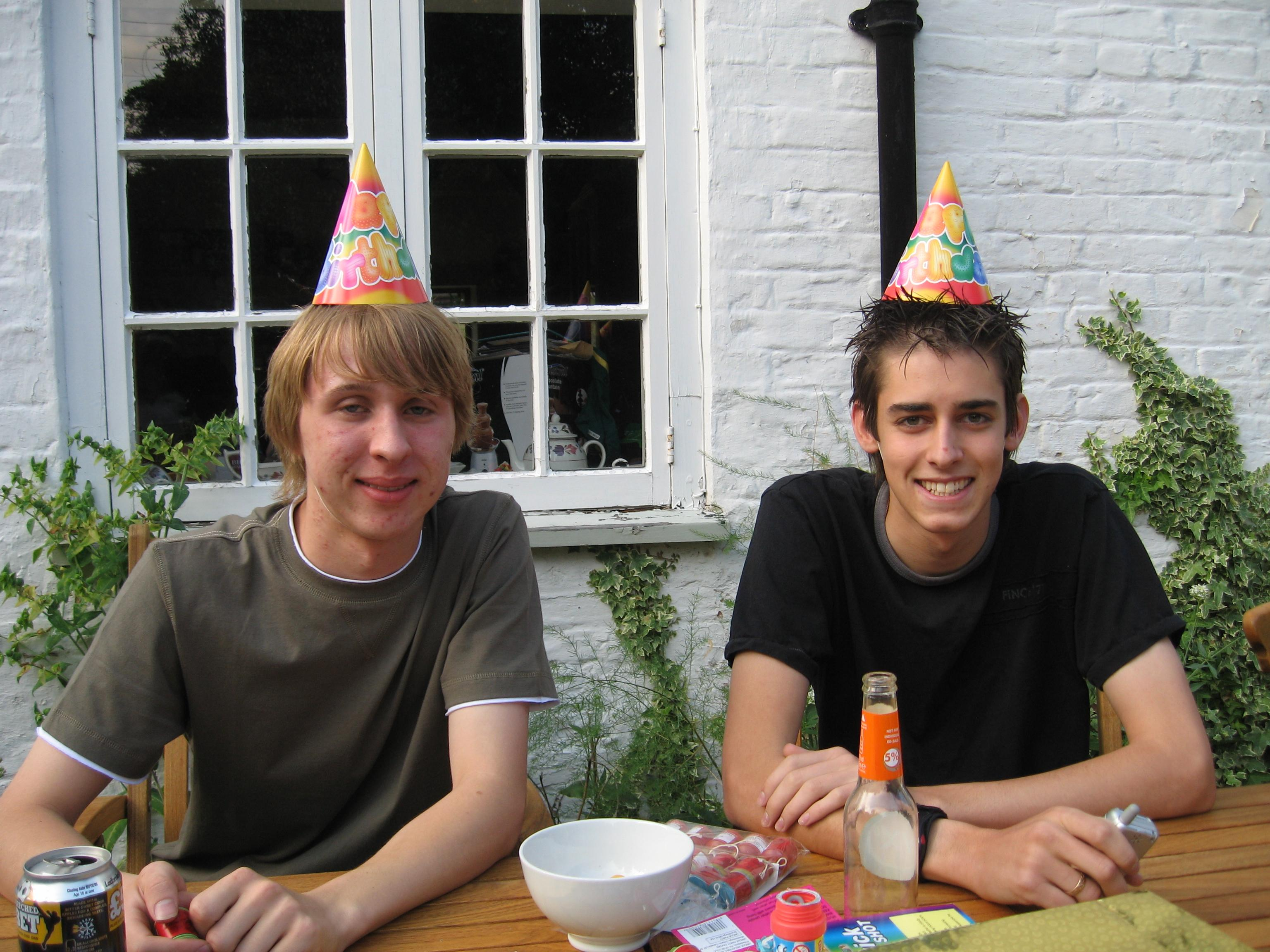
Party hat

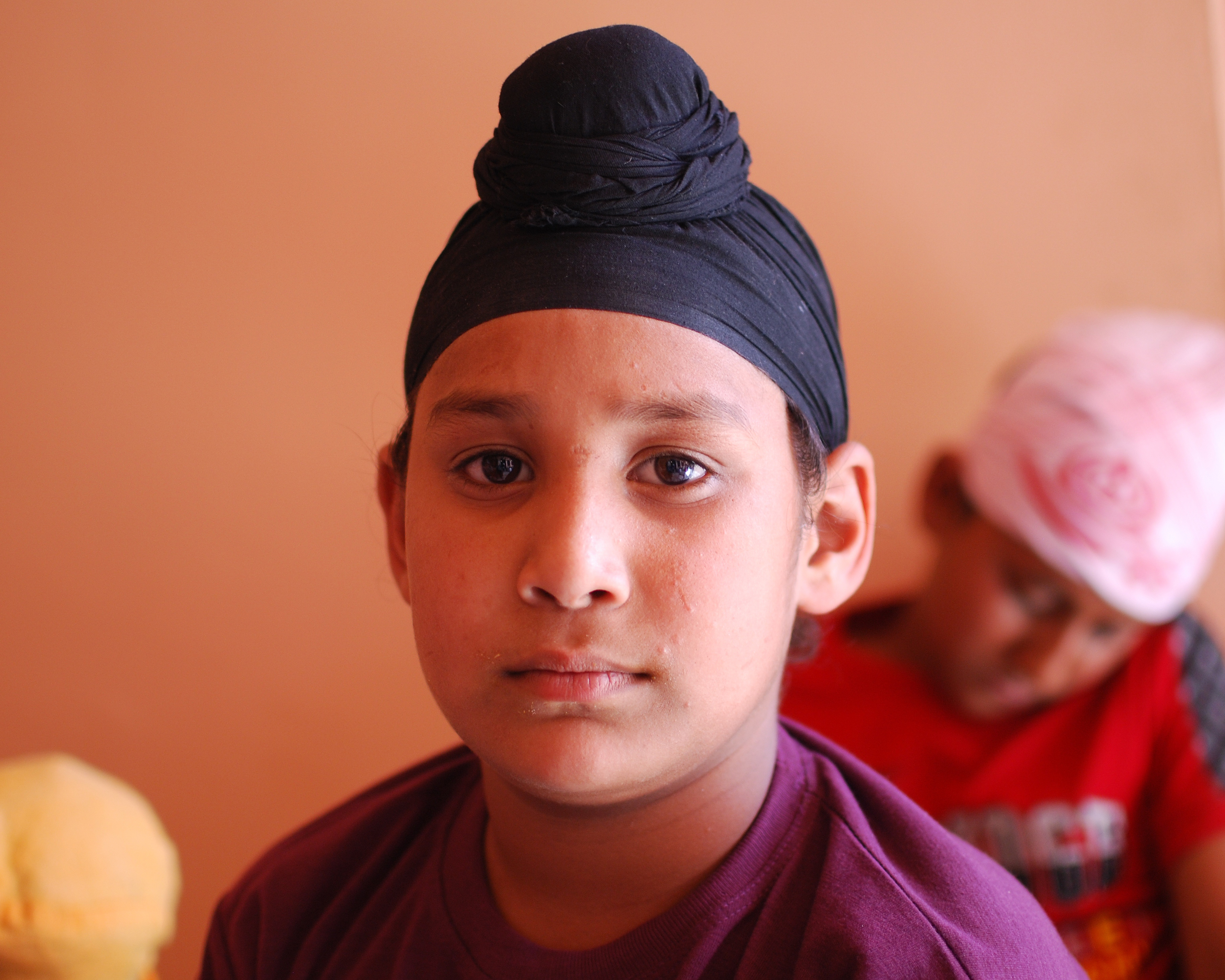
Patka

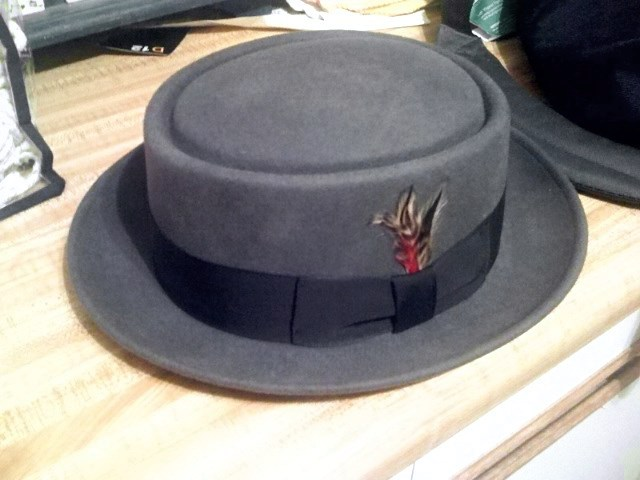
Pork pie hat

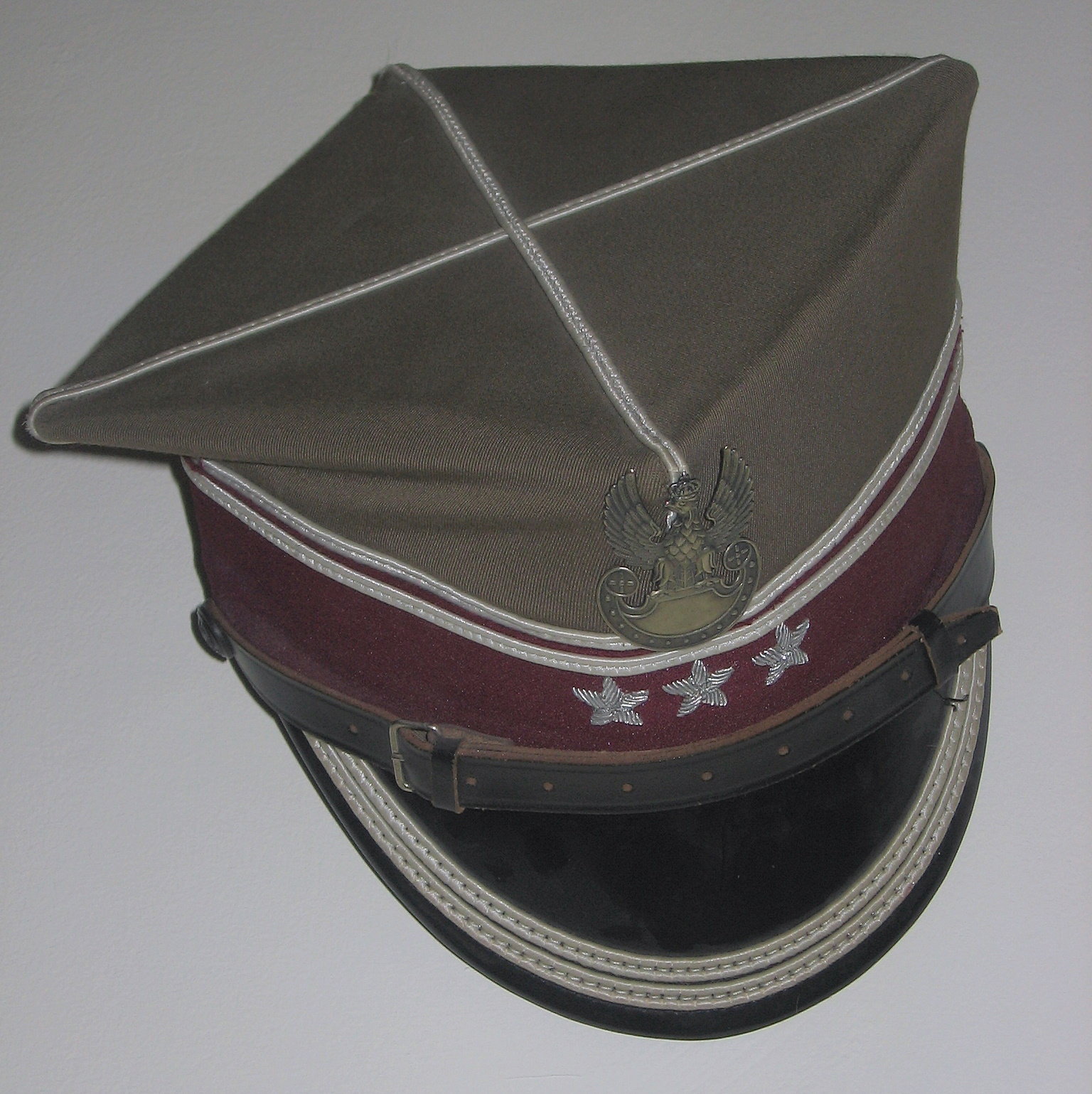
Rogatywka

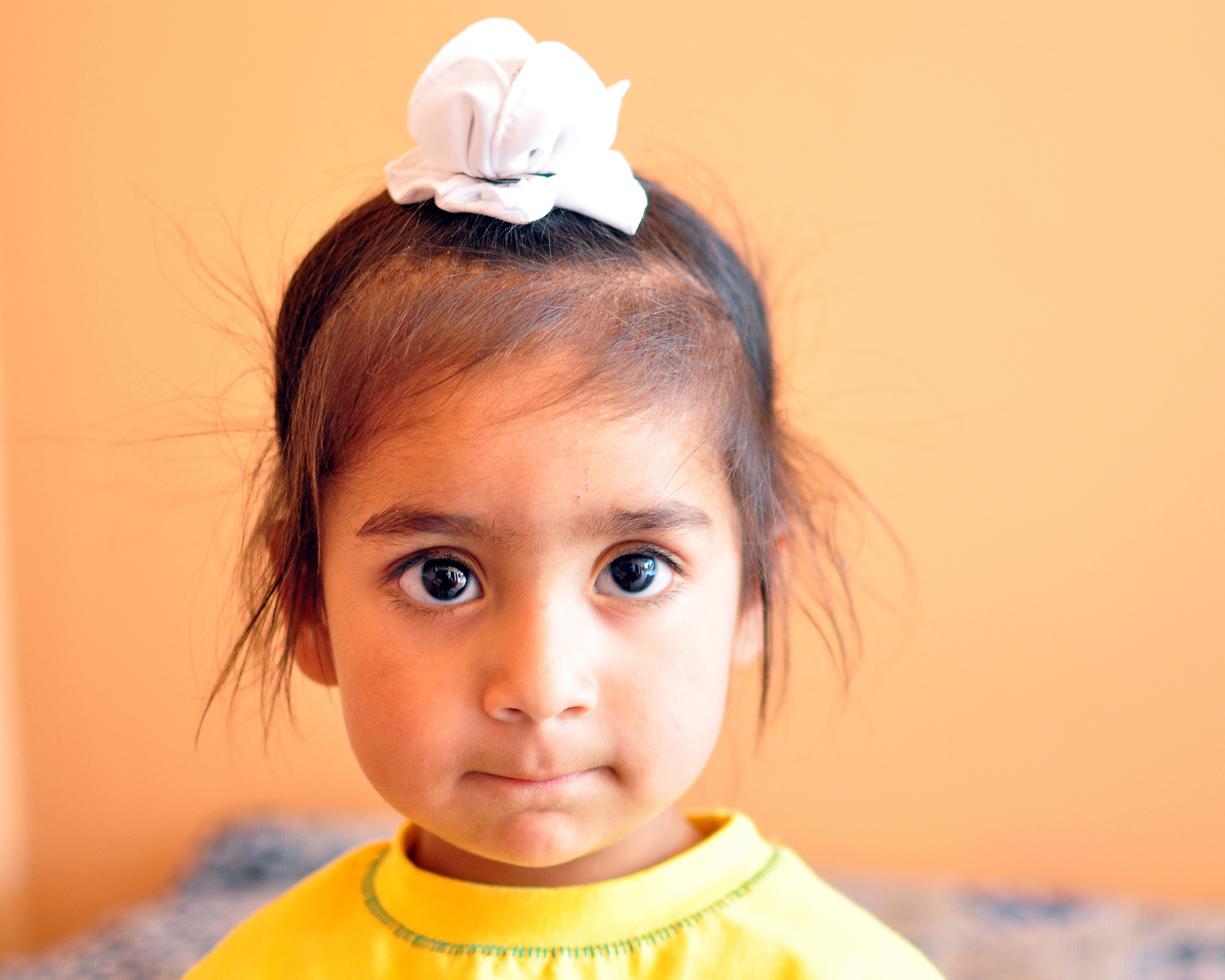
Rumal

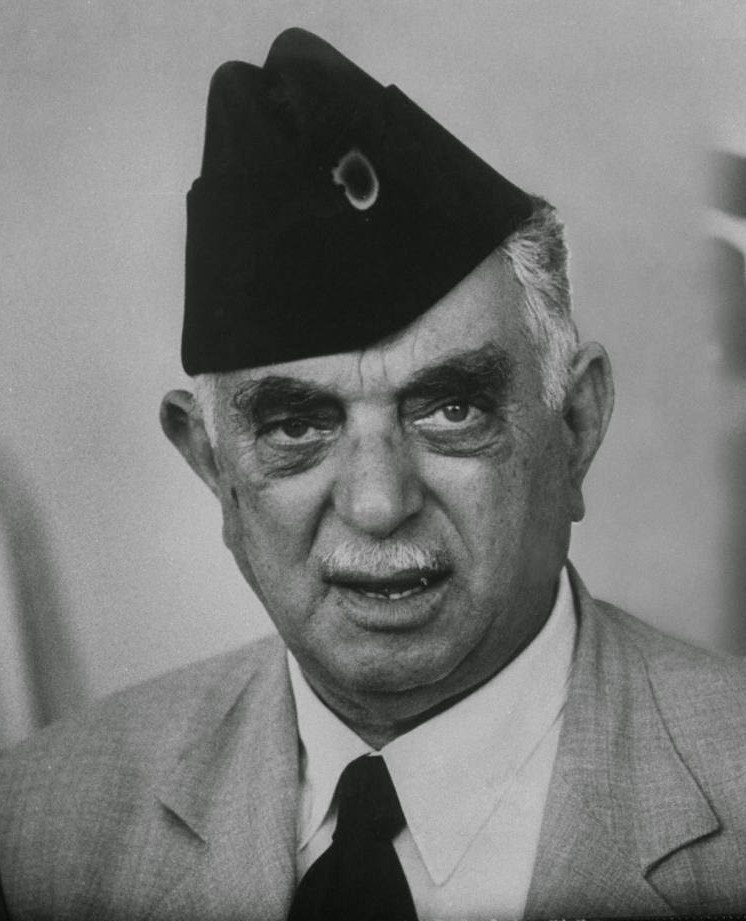
Sidara also faisaliyya

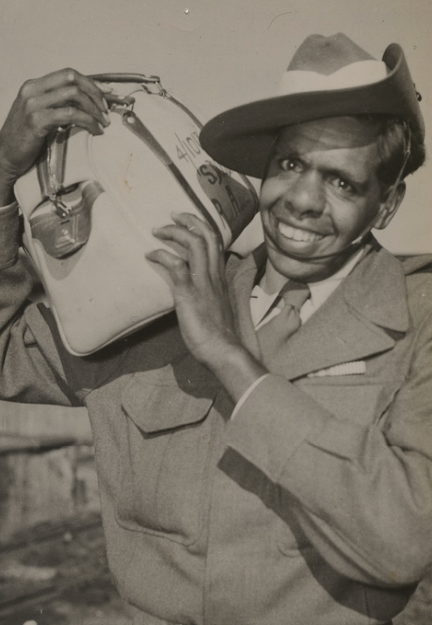
Slouch hat

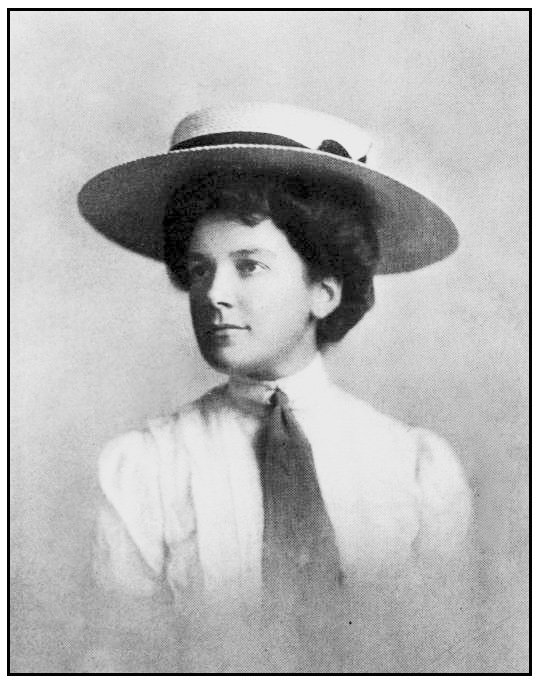
Sailor hat

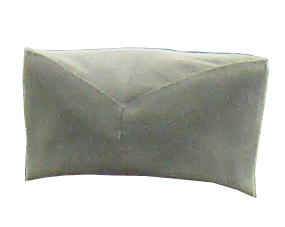
Šajkača

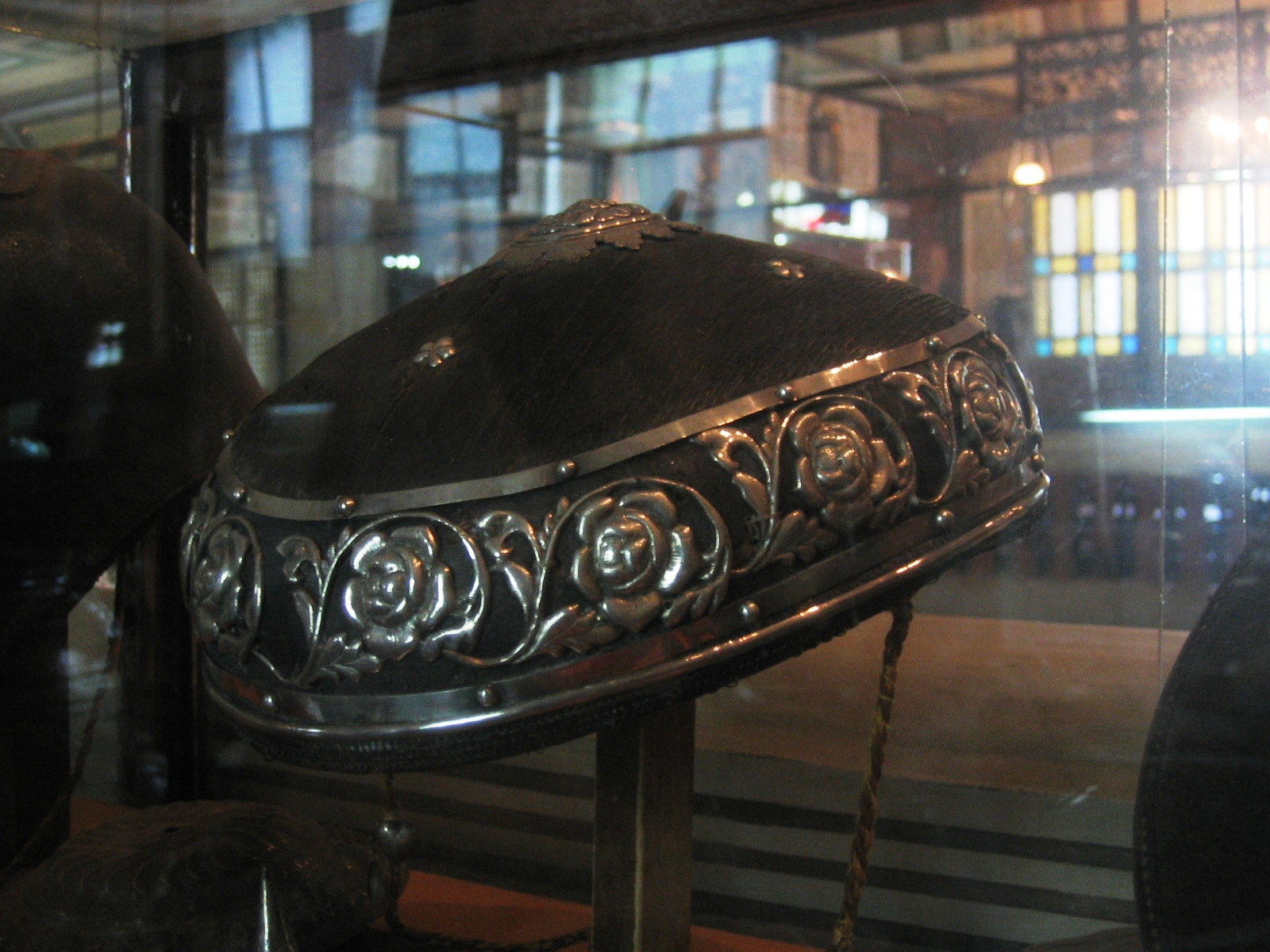
Salakot

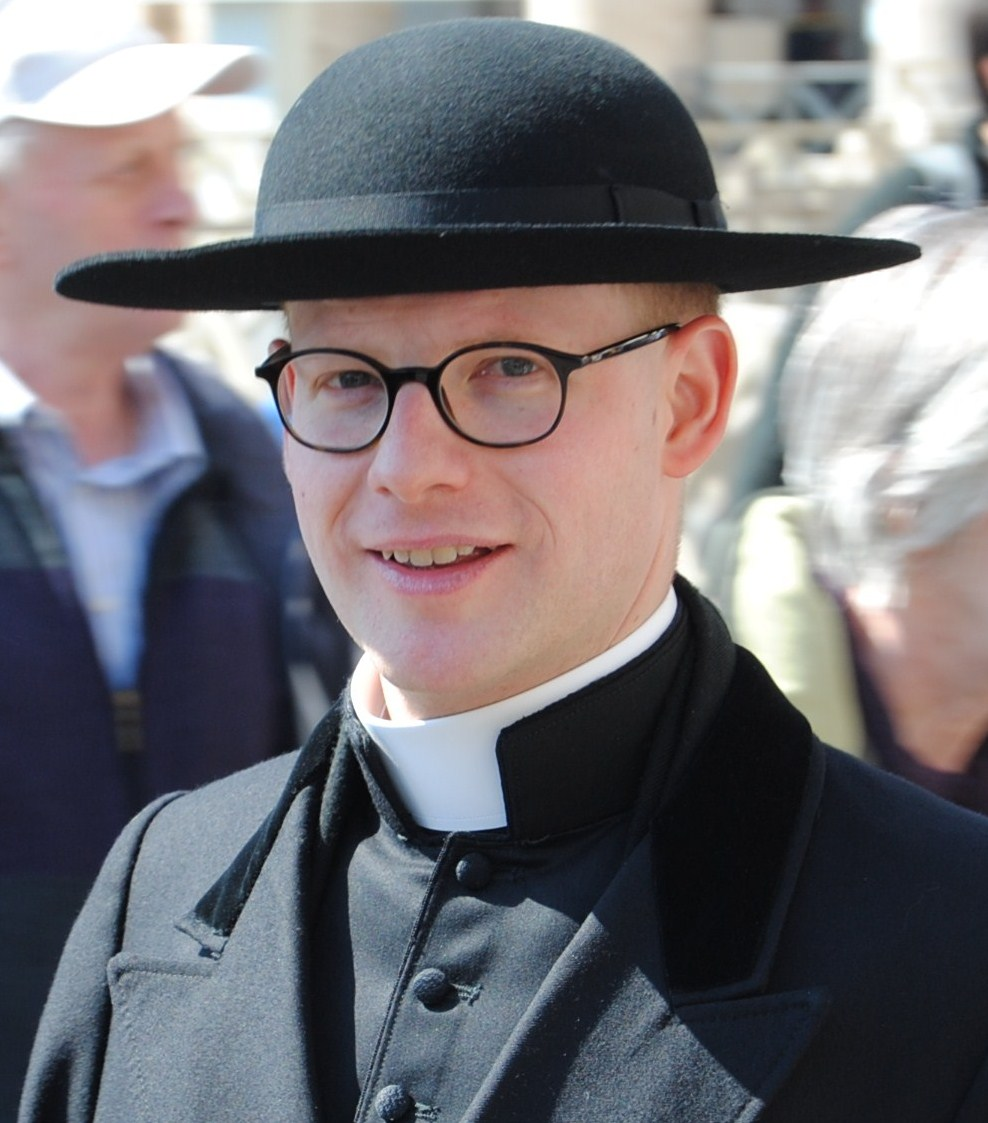
Cappello romano

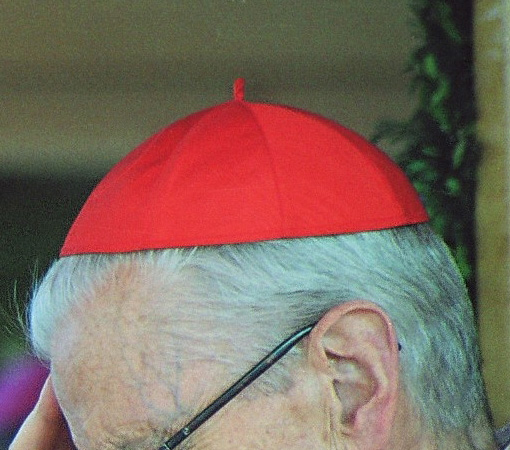
Skullcap, also zucchetto

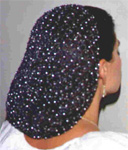
Snood

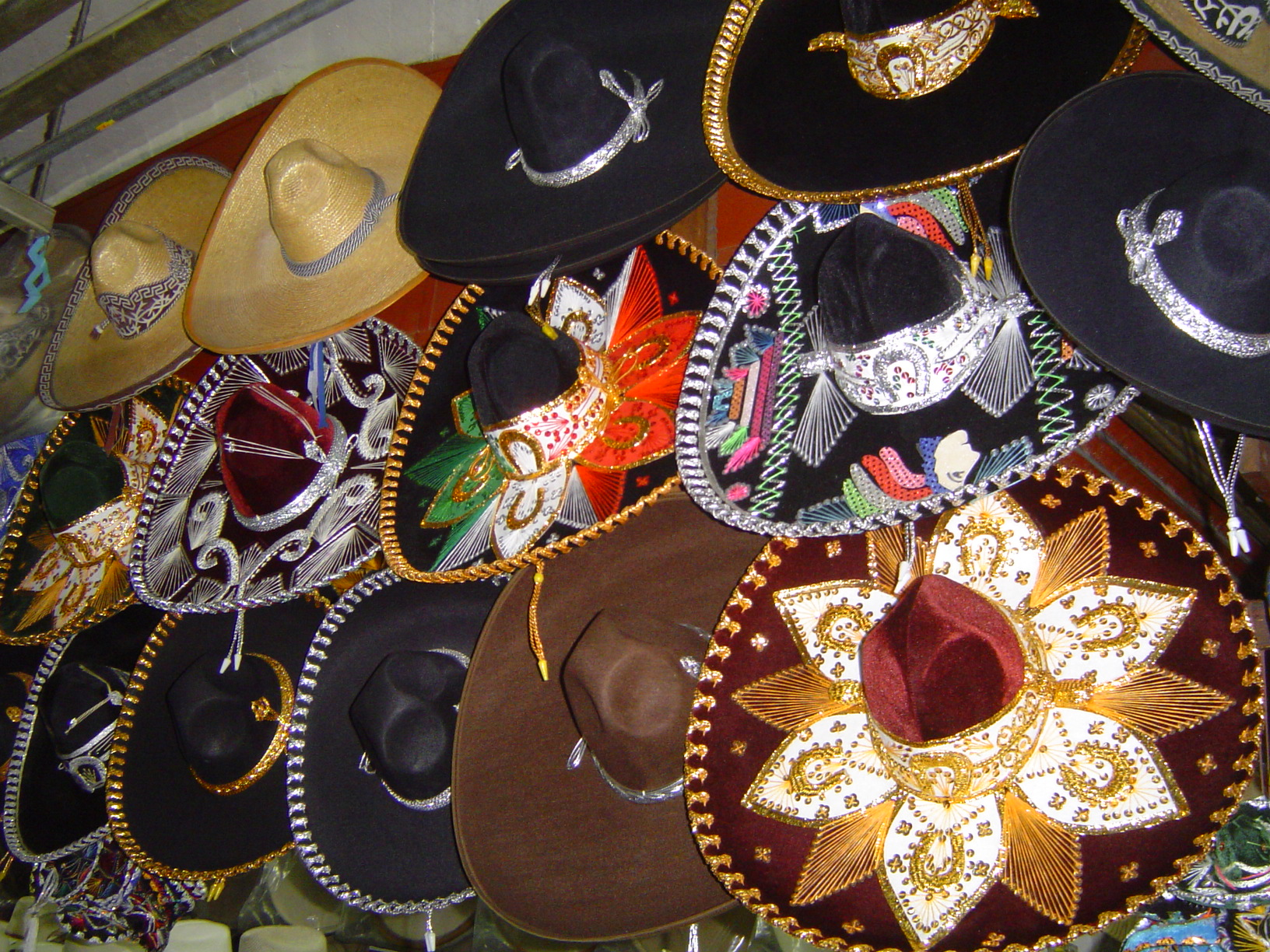
Sombrero

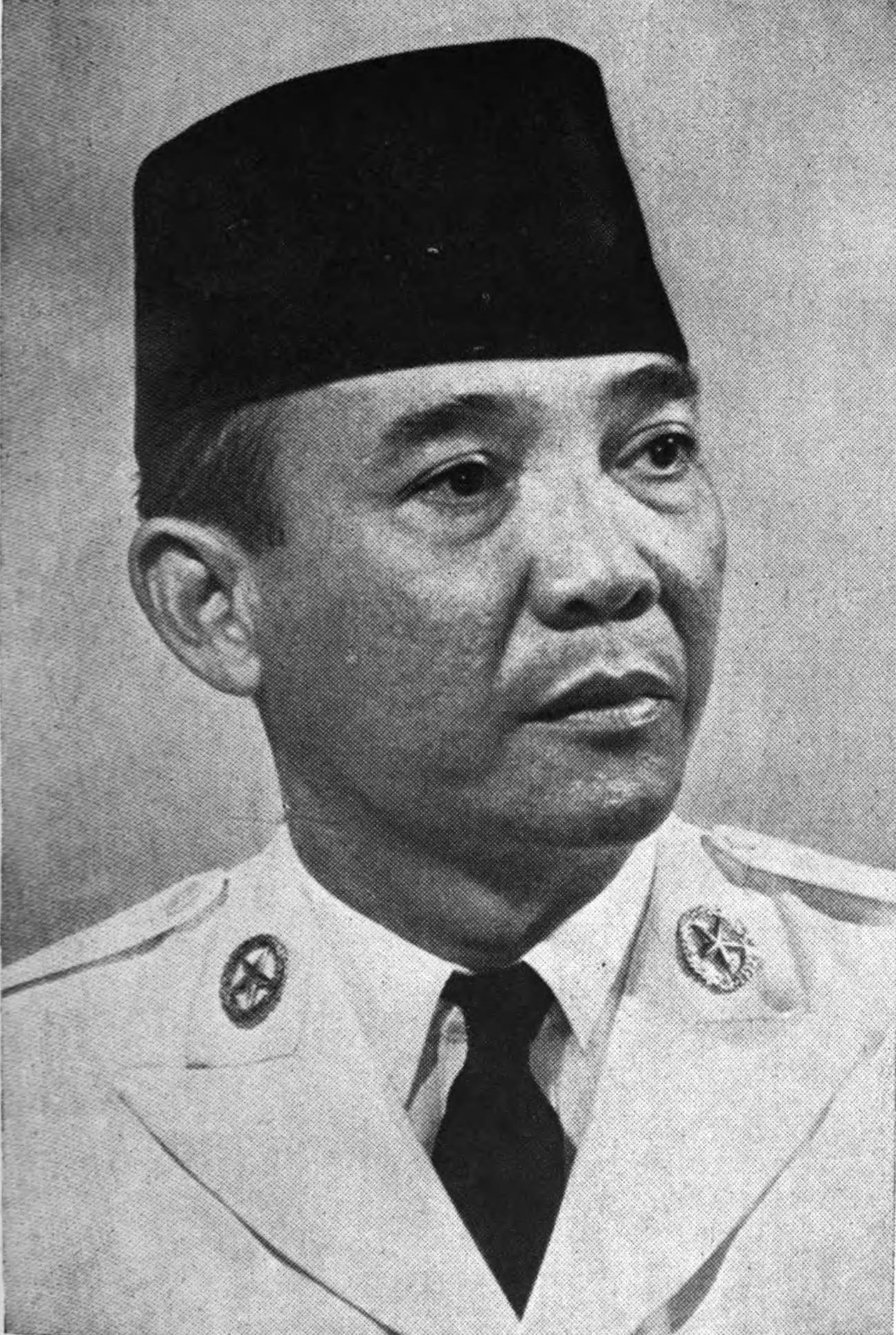
Songkok

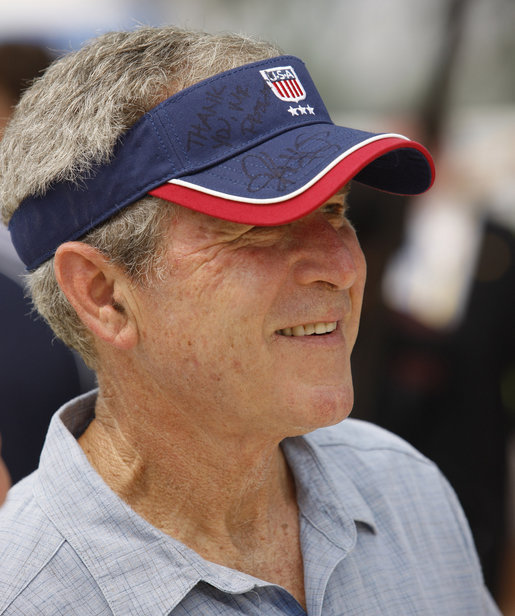
Sports visor

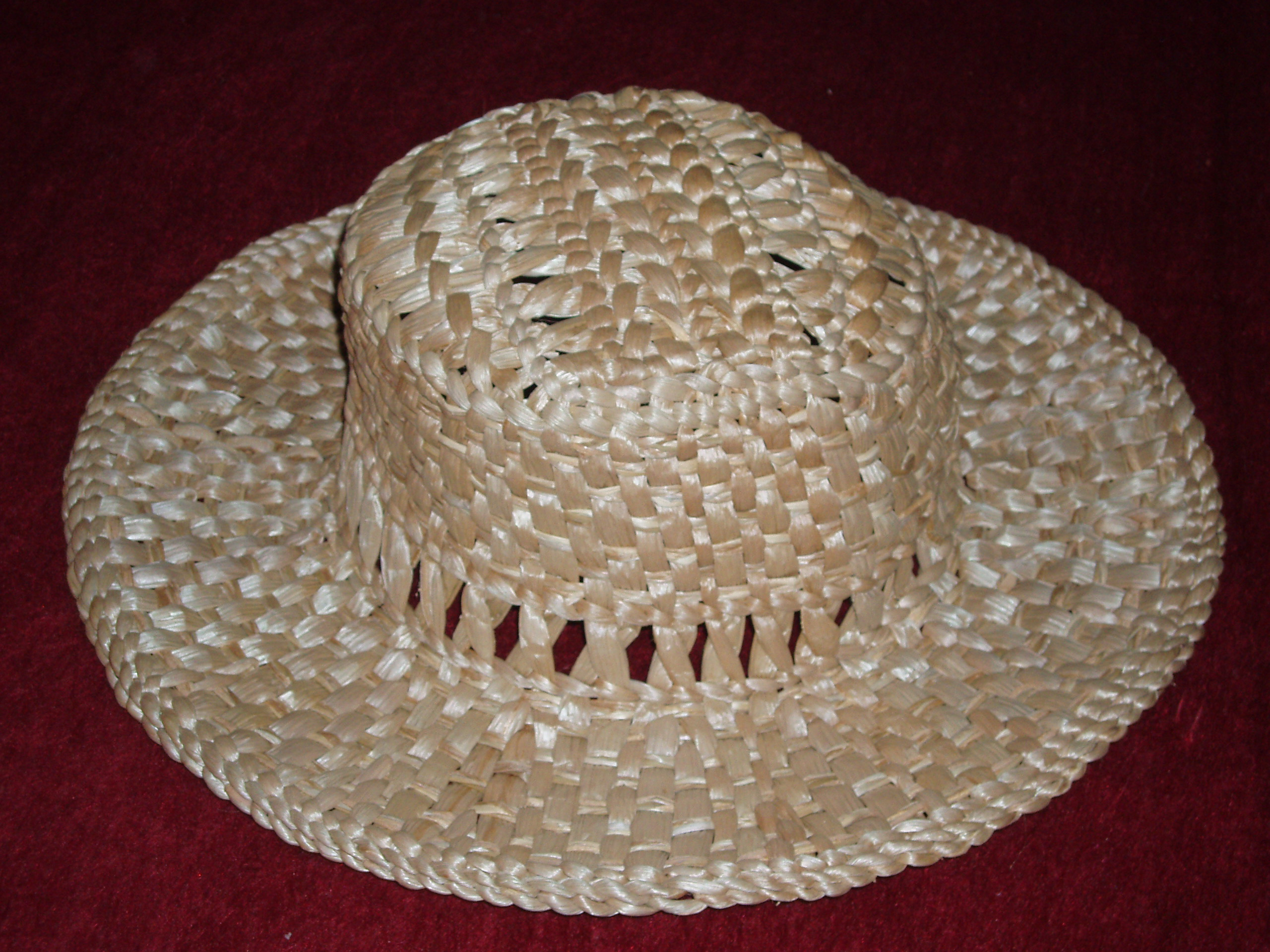
Straw hat

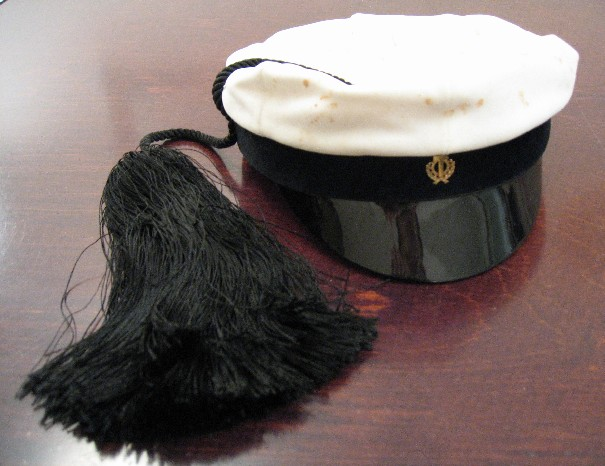
Student cap

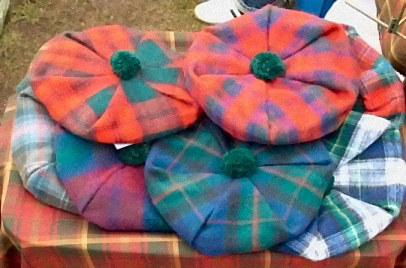
Tam, or tam o' shanter

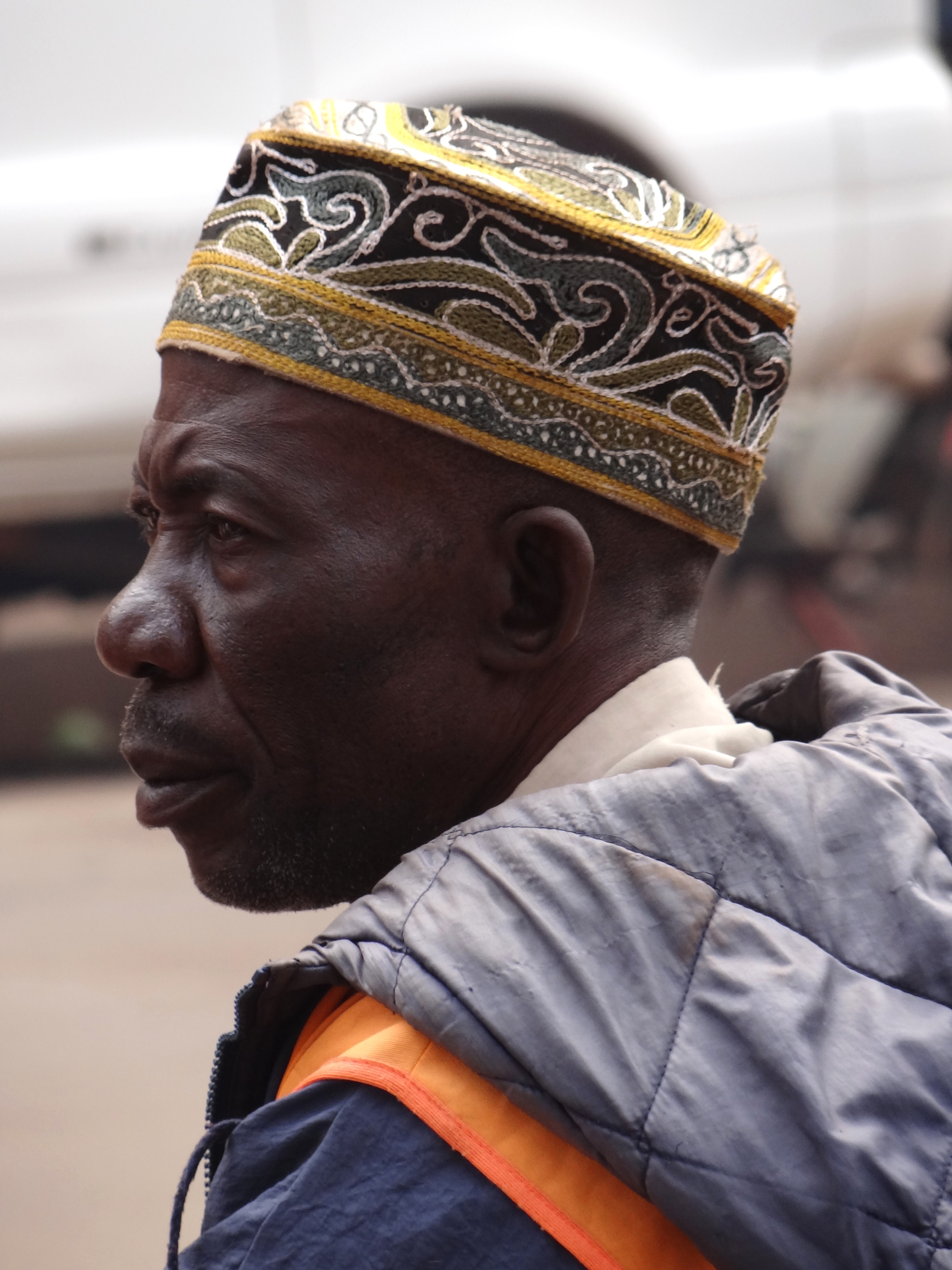
Taqiya, also tagiyah

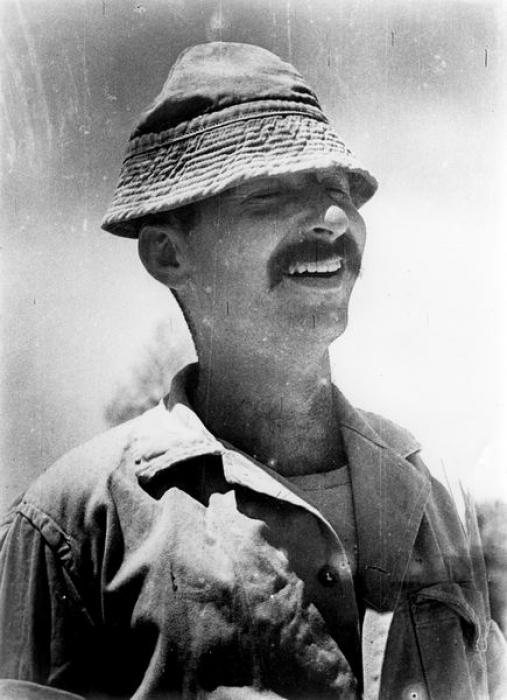
Tembel hat, or kova tembel

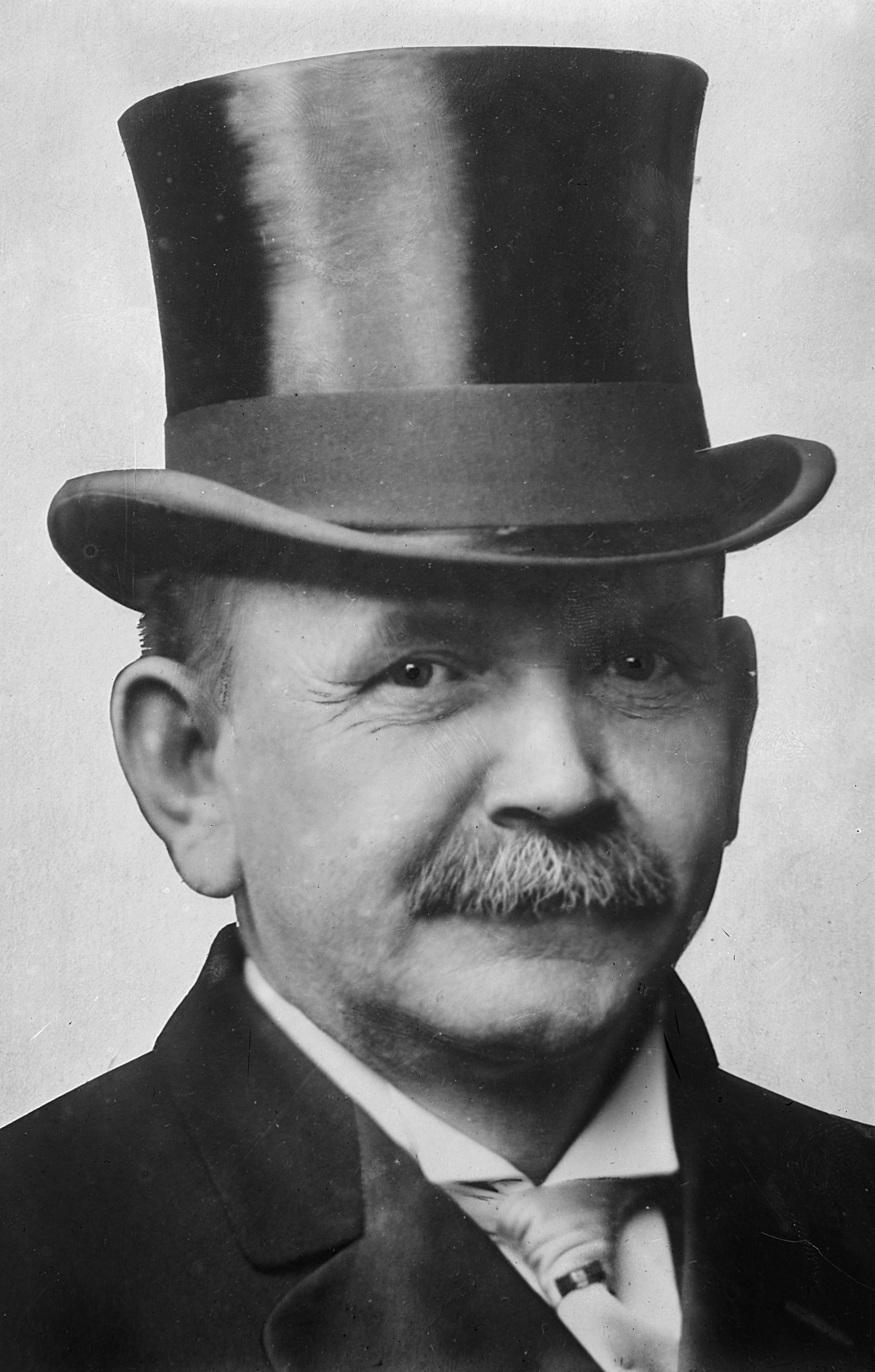
Top hat (also, topper)

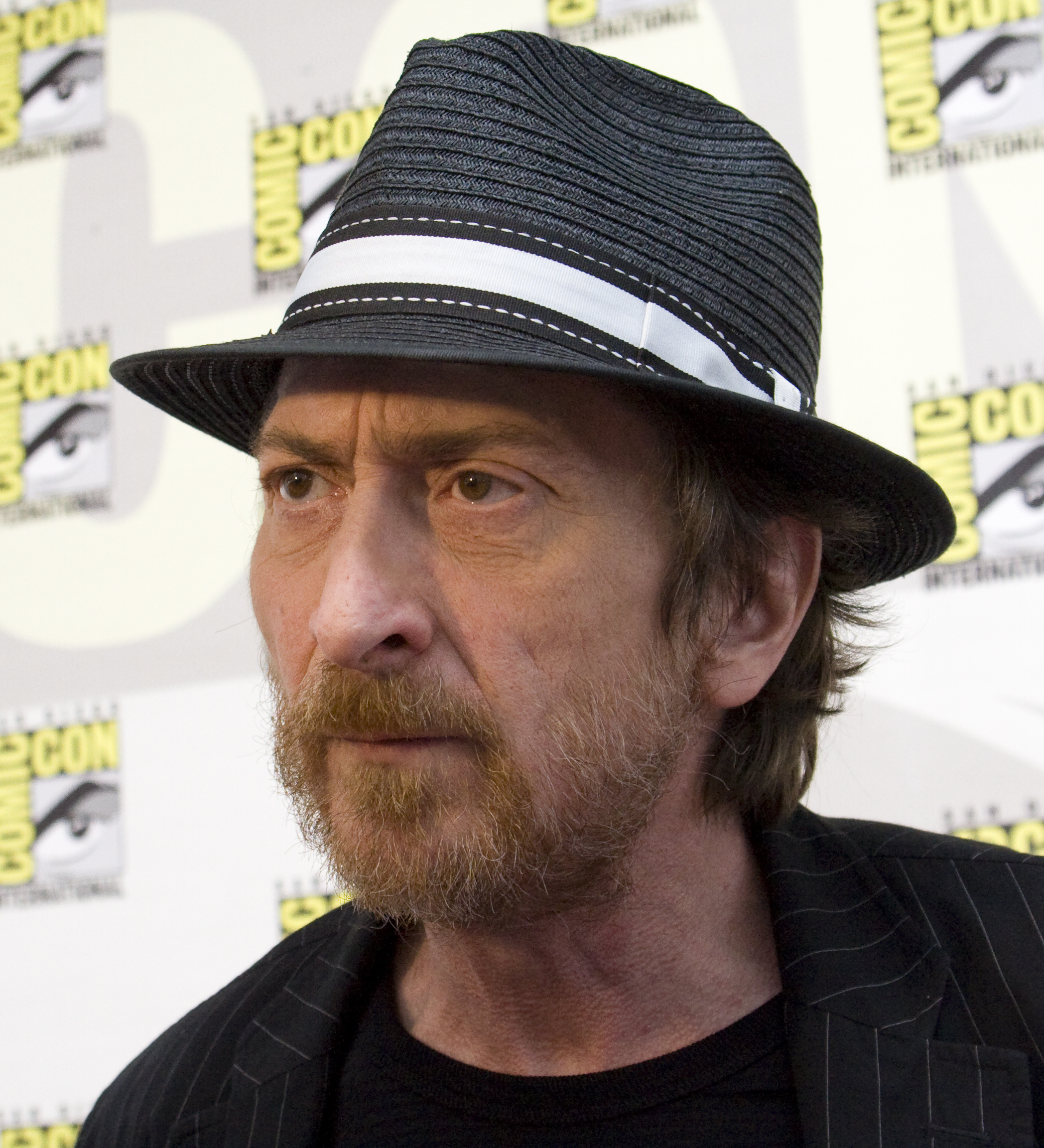
Trilby

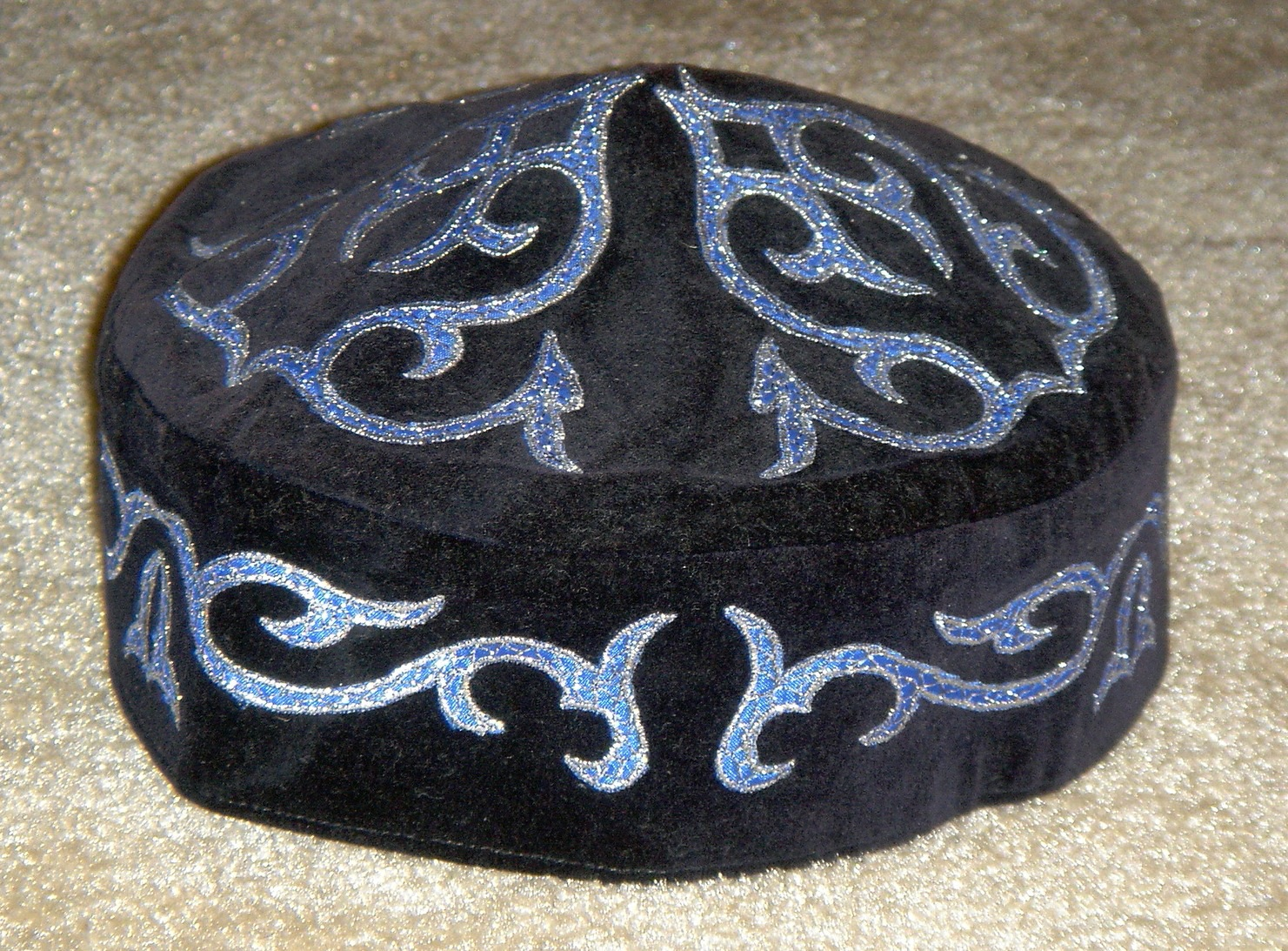
Tubeteika

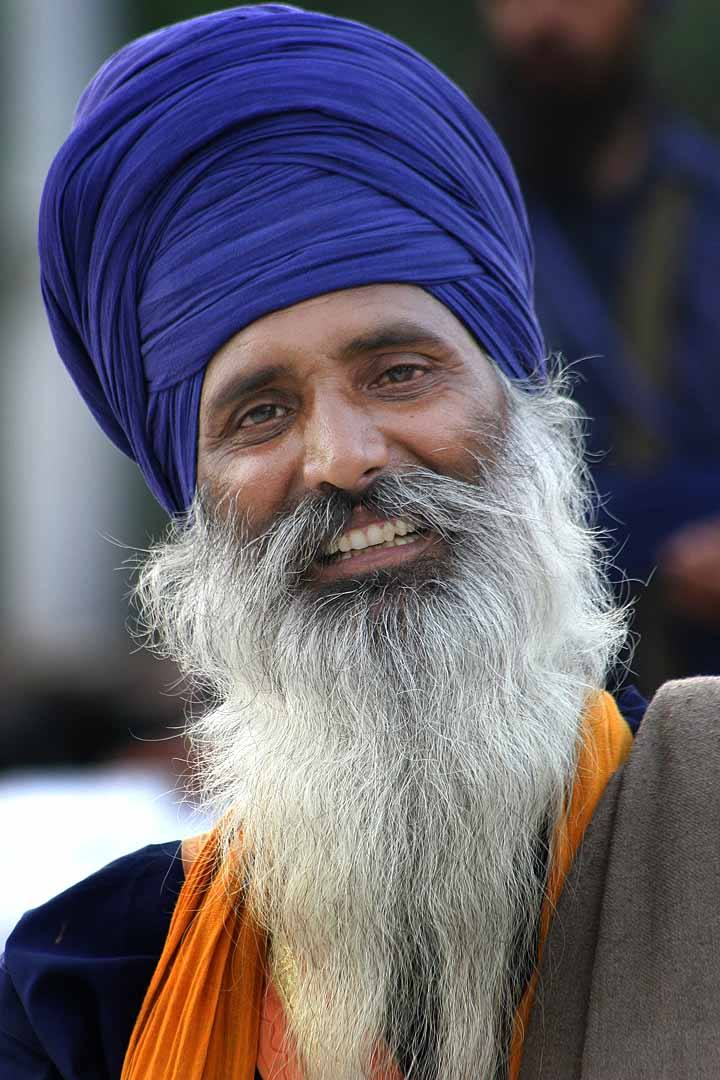
Turban

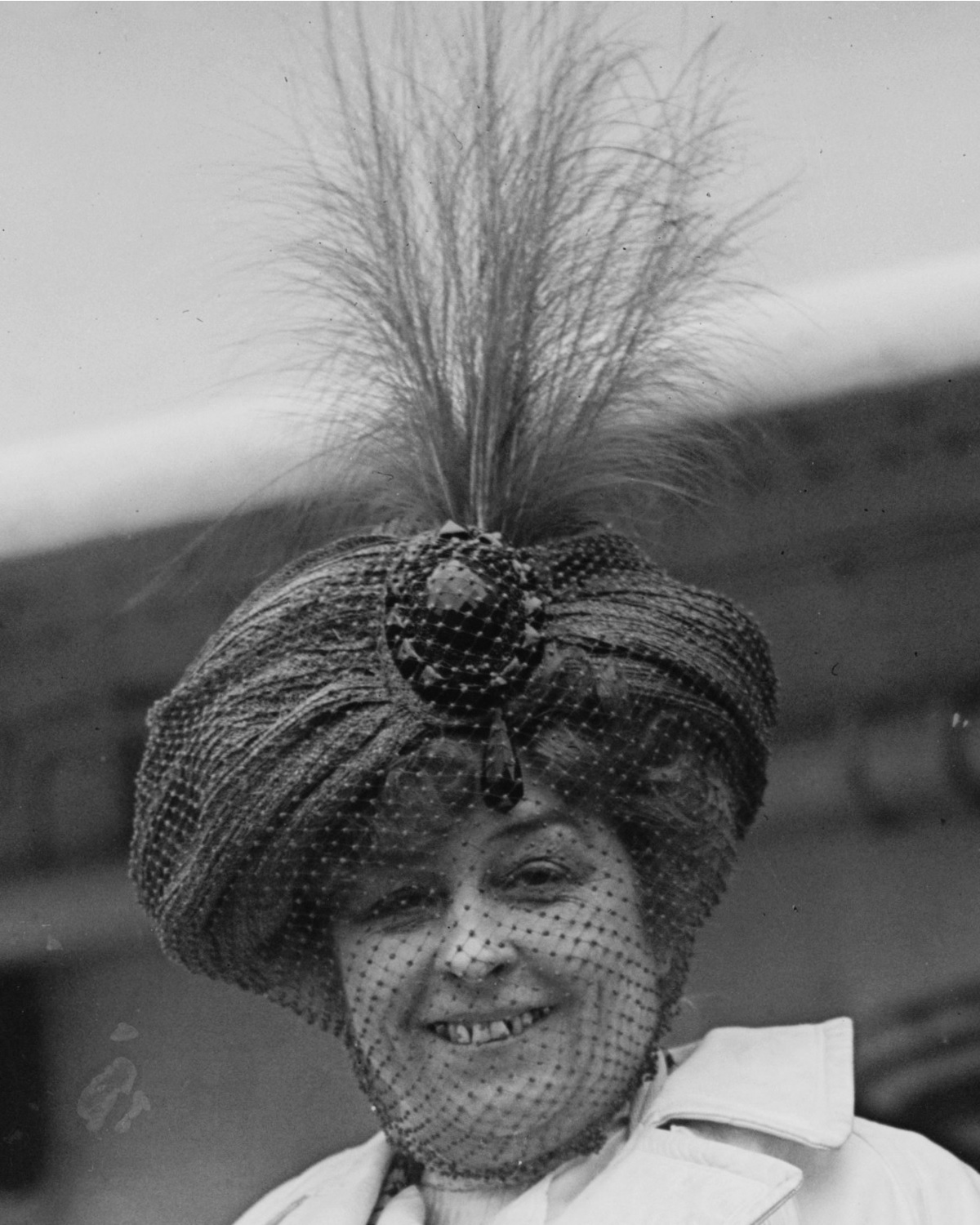
Turban hat

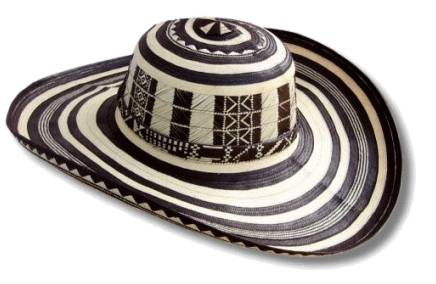
Vueltiao

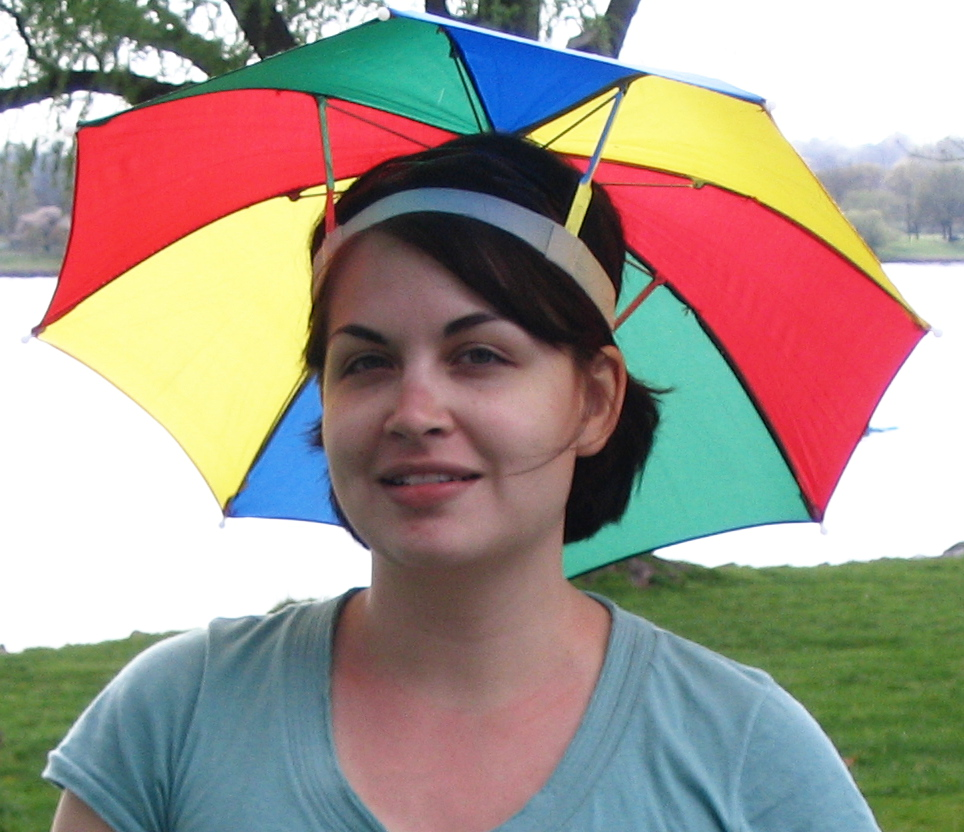
Umbrella hat

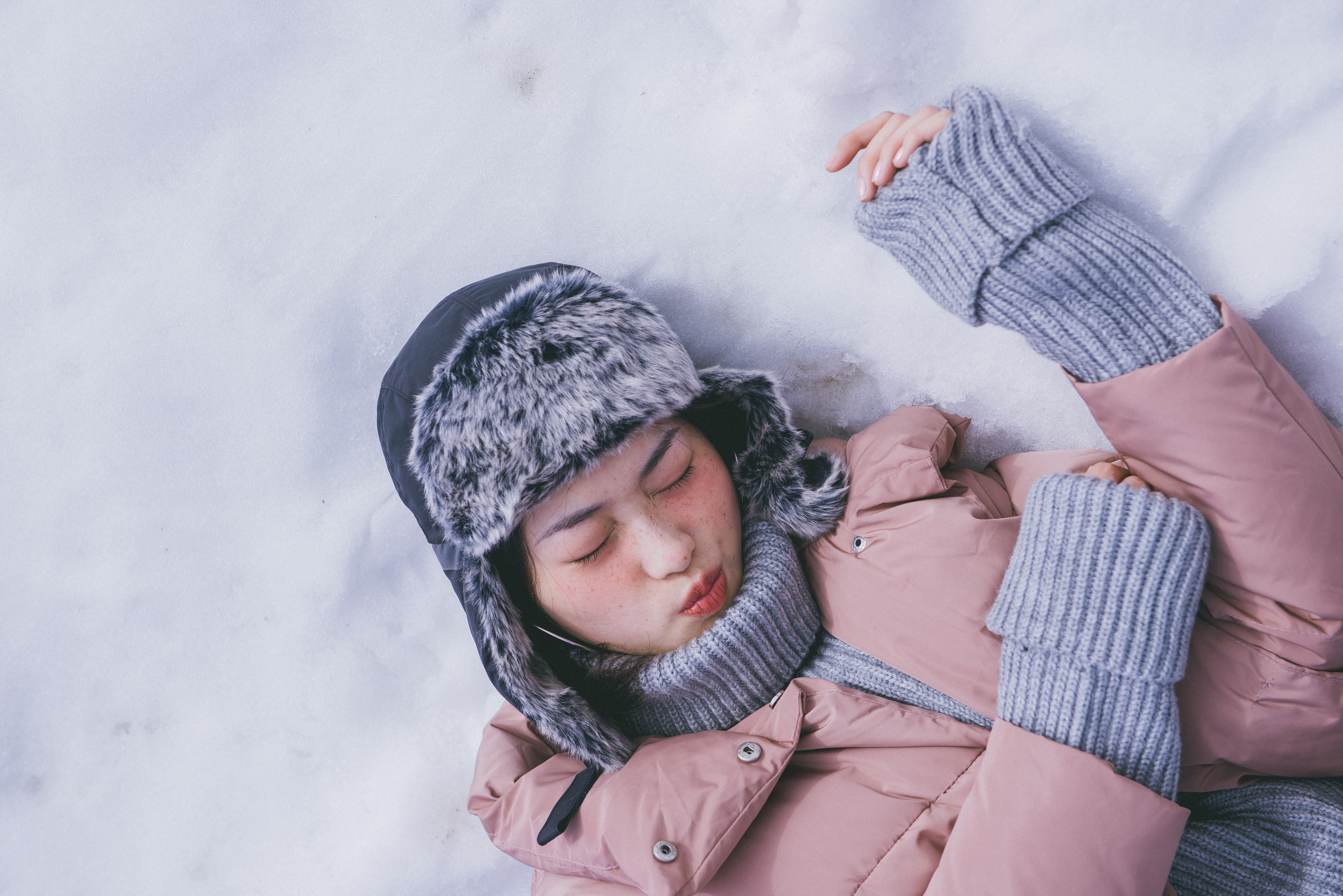
Ushanka

=== Worn in the past, or rarely worn today ===
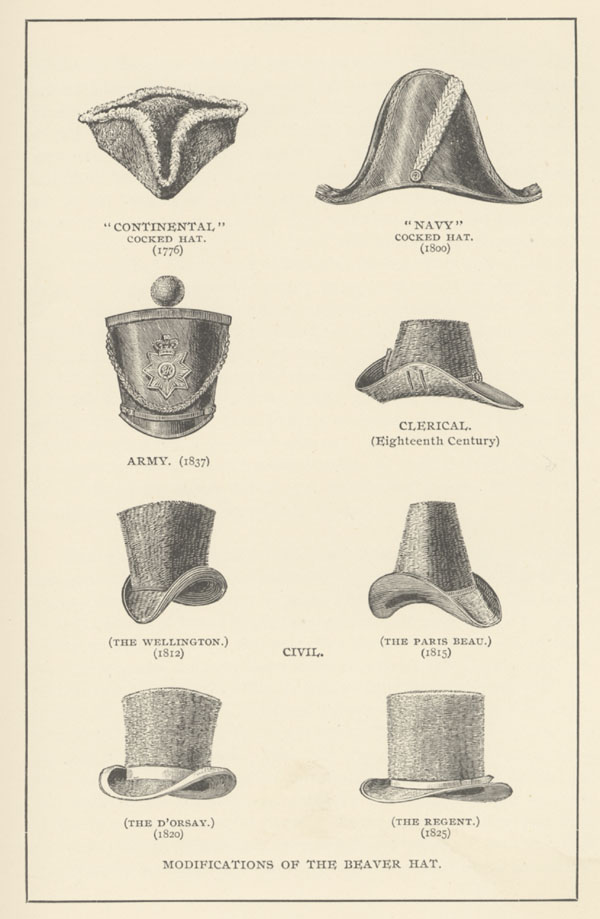
Shapes and styles of beaver hats 1776–1825

==== Men's ====
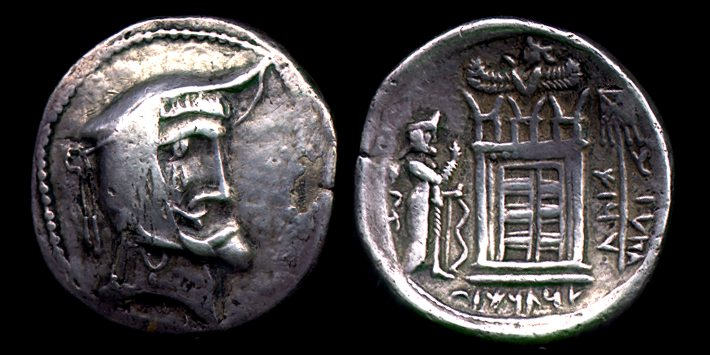
Ancient coins showing possible Persian tiara on Autophradates and Phrygian cap on Orontes I
- American fiber helmet – for use in tropical regions; similar to pith helmet
- Anthony Eden hat
- Beaver hat
- Beefeaters' hat
- Bicorne
- Boater, also basher, skimmer
- Boss of the plains
- Bowler, also coke hat, billycock, boxer, bun hat, derby
- Busby
- Bycocket – a hat with a wide brim that is turned up in the back and pointed in the front
- Cabbage-tree hat – a hat woven from leaves of the cabbage tree
- Capotain (and women) – a tall conical hat, 17th century, usually black – also, copotain, copatain
- Caubeen – Irish hat
- Cavalier hat, also chevaliers – wide-brimmed hat trimmed with ostrich plumes
- Chapeau-bras, also chapeau-de-bras – 18th- to early-19th-century folding bicorne hat carried under one arm
- Chaperon – a series of hats that evolved in 14th- and 15th-century Europe from the medieval hood of the same name
- Cocked hat
- Colback – a fur headpiece of Turkish origin
- Deerstalker – hunting cap with fold-down ears, associated with Sherlock Holmes, Elmer Fudd, Holden Caulfield, and Ignatius Reilly
- Đinh Tự
- Fedora
- Arakhchin
- Fez
- Hanfu hats and headwear – ancient Chinese hats
- Homburg
- Kolpik
- Labbadeh
- Kurkhars
- Litham
- Malahai
- Gugiuman
- Işlic
- Panama hat
- Papakha
- Pava
- Peci
- Pith helmet – for use in tropical regions; the American fiber helmet is a version of it
- Pork pie hat
- Shovel hat
- Sidara – national Iraqi headgear
- Shtreimel
- Sombrero
- Spodik
- Keffiyah or sudra
- Papal tiara – a hat traditionally worn by the Pope, which has been abandoned in recent decades, in favor of the mitre
- Top hat, also stovepipe hat, chimney pot hat, lum hat, or (in collapsible form) gibus
- Tricorne
- Trilby, sometimes (incorrectly) called "fedora"
- Wideawake hat
- Umbrella hat

==== Women's ====
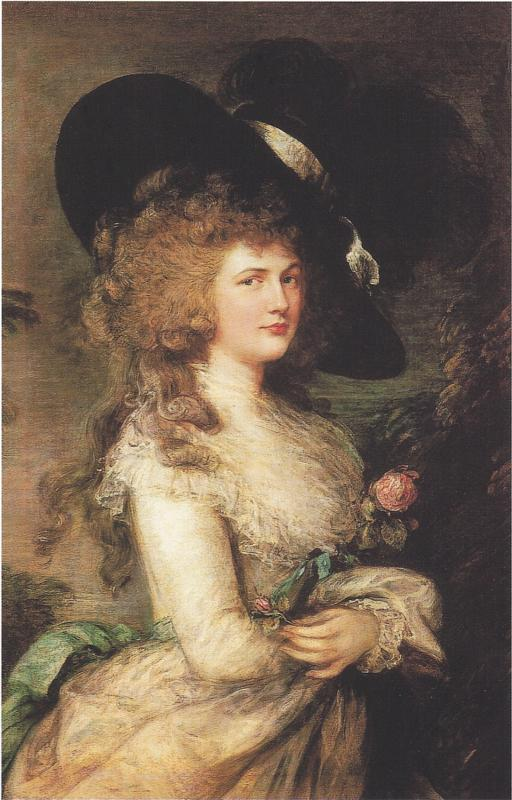
Portrait of Georgiana, Duchess of Devonshire wearing a Gainsborough hat, Thomas Gainsborough, Chatsworth House

- Bandeau hat
- Beaver hat
- Beehive
- Bergère hat
- Ba tầm
- Bloomer
- Bongrace – a velvet-covered headdress, stiffened with buckram – 16th century
- Breton – originating in 19th-century France, a lightweight hat, usually in straw, with upturned brim all the way round
- Capeline – 18th–19th century
- Capotain (and men) – a tall conical hat, 17th century, usually black – also, copotain, copatain
- Cartwheel hat – low crown, wide stiff brim
- Cocktail hat
- Doll hat – a scaled-down hat, usually worn tilted forward on the head
- Gainsborough hat – a very large hat often elaborately decorated with plumes, flowers, and trinkets
- Half hat – a millinery design that only covers part of the head and may be stiffened fabric or straw
- Hennin
- Kokoshnik
- Nón lá
- Ochipok
- Pamela hat
- Pussyhat – a pink, knitted hat created in large numbers by thousands of participants involved with the United States 2017 Women's March
- Tantour

==== Unclassified ====
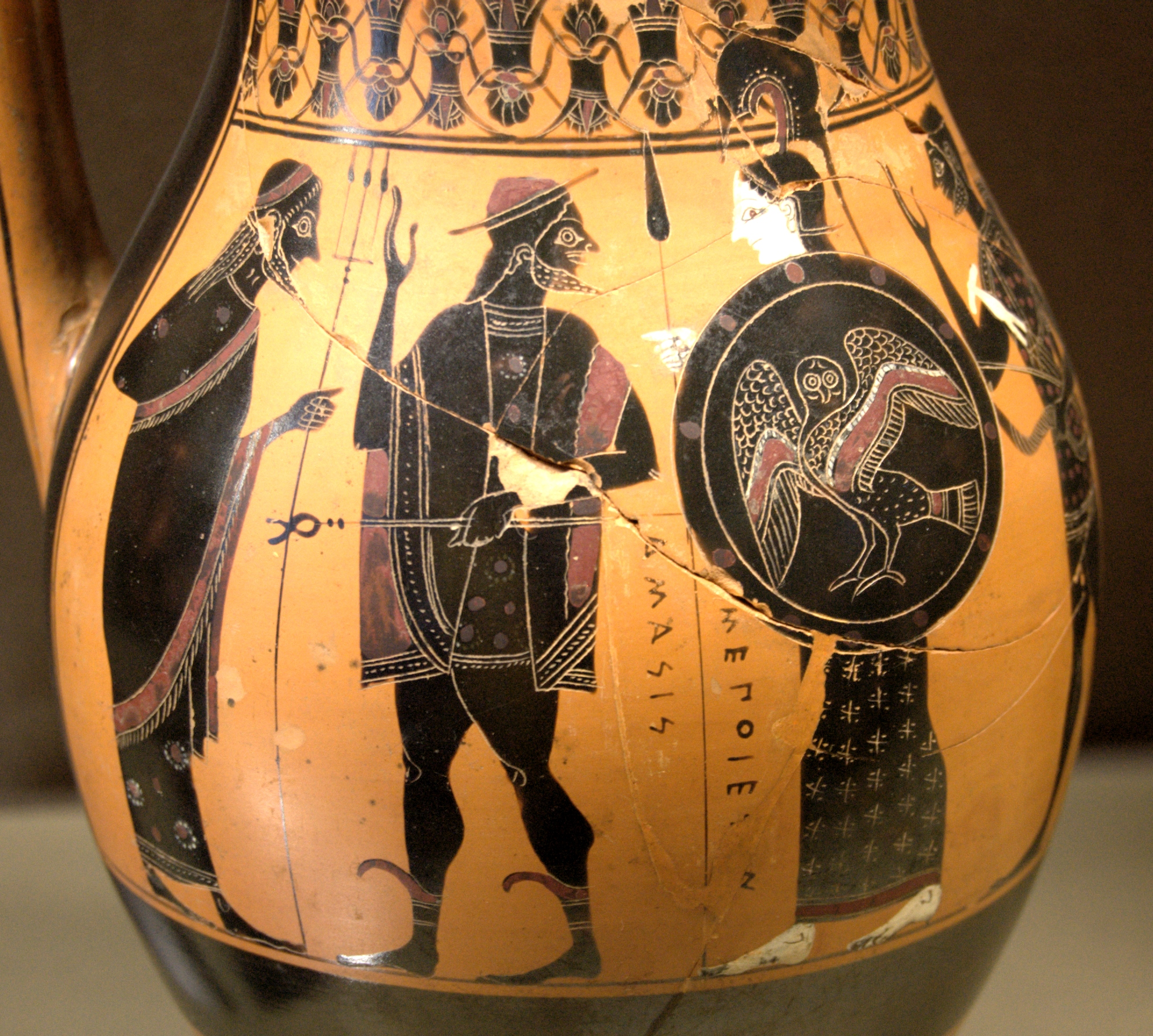
Hermes wearing a hat. Ancient Greek Attic black-figure olpe, 550–530 BC. Louvre Museum, Paris.

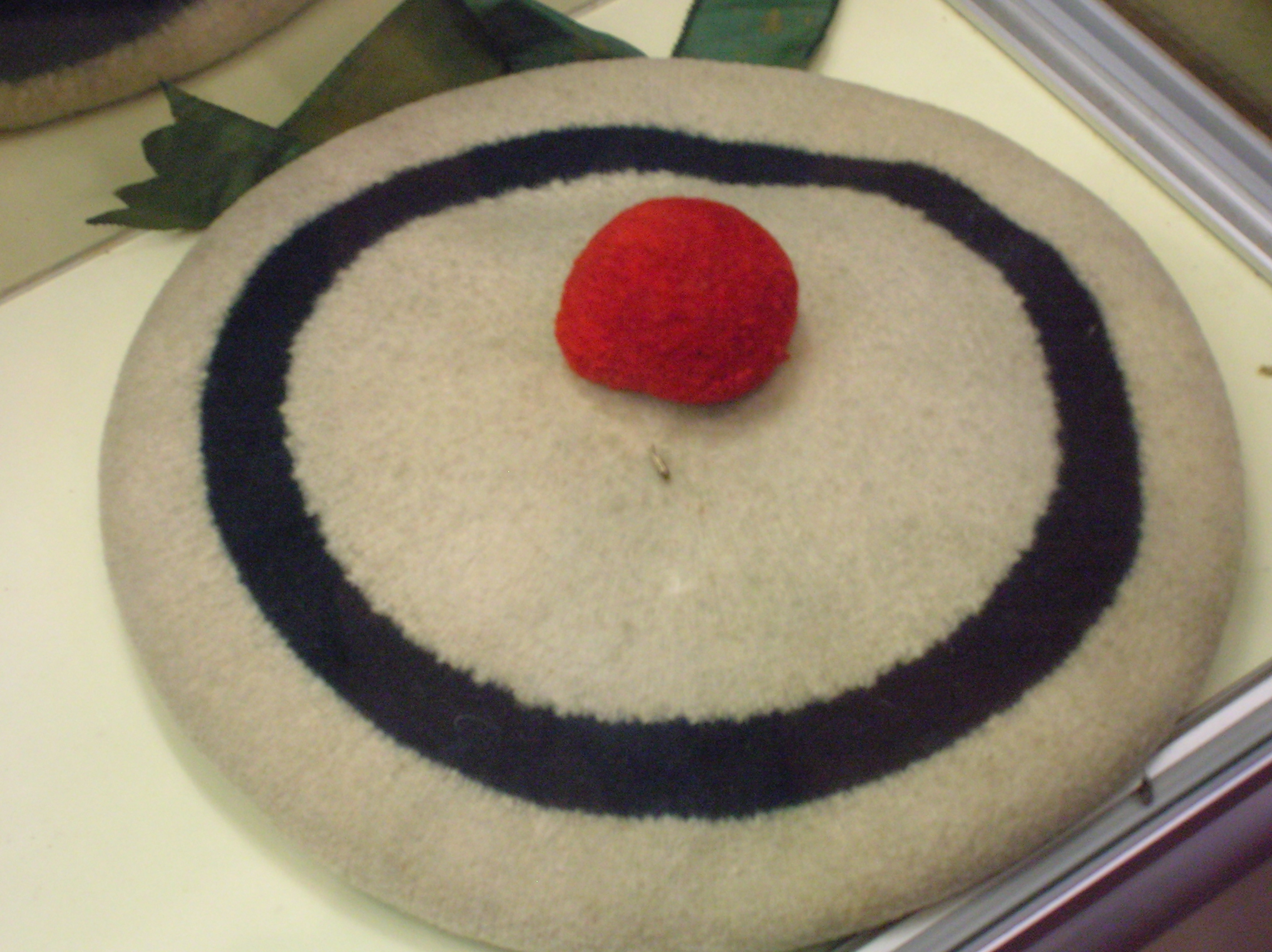
The traditional bonnet of the Kilwinning Archers of Scotland

- Archer's bonnet
- Balibuntal – straw hat from the Philippines
- Castor or caster – beaver or rabbit (see beaver hat)
- Chip hat
- Cloche hat
- Cockle hat
- Cony or coney
- Coolie hat
- Copintank, also copentank, coptank, copitaine
- Cordies
- Cossack hat
- Demicastor hat, (see beaver hat)
- Directoire
- Dolly Varden
- Fan-tail hat
- Flat
- Garbo hat
- Garibaldi hat
- Gipsy hat
- Golden hat – from Bronze Age Europe
- Gossamer hat
- Grebe hat
- Halo hat – millinery design in which the headgear creates a circular frame for the face, creating a halo effect
- Hat Terrai Gurkha, worn only by Gurkha Contingent officers in Singapore
- Homburg – a black Homburg was also known as an "Anthony Eden" (after the politician Anthony Eden)
- Hunting hat
- Jaapi of Assam, India
- Jerry
- Kausia
- Kevenhuller
- Kiss-me-quick hat
- Leghorn hat
- Mandarin hat
- Manilla hat
- Marquis hat
- Matinée hat
- Merry Widow hat
- Moab
- Montera
- Mourning hat
- Mousquetaire
- Müller hat
- Mushroom
- Petasos
- Pill box hat
- Pilotka
- Quadricorn – a four-cornered hat
- Sugar loaf
- Veiled hat, also bird cage hat

== Caps ==
=== Caps worn by men in the past, or rarely worn today ===
- Aviator's cap
- Barretina
- Brodrick cap (a military cap named after St John Brodrick, 1st Earl of Midleton)
- Cap and bells ("jester cap", "jester hat" or "fool's cap")
- Capeline – a steel skullcap worn by archers in the Middle Ages
- Cricket cap
- Dunce cap
- Forage cap
- Gat, a mesh hat worn during the Joseon period in Korea.
- Hooker-doon, a cloth cap with a peak, in Scotland
- Icelandic tail-cap
- Jockey's cap
- Kalpak
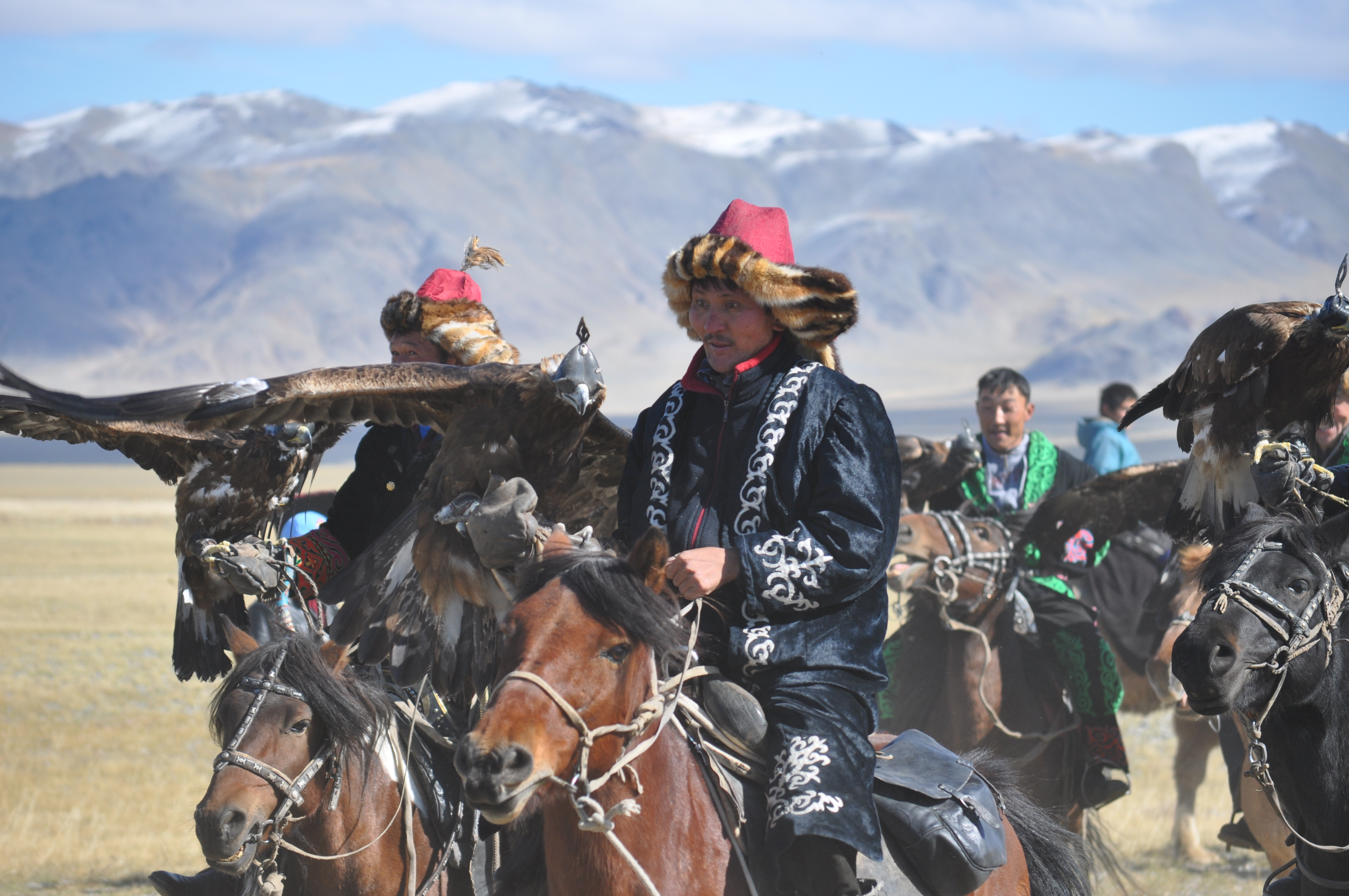
  Kazakh hunters on horseback wearing Kalpak (headgear) and holding eagles
- Loovuuz – Mongolian fur headgear
- Monmouth cap
- Nightcap
- Phrygian cap
- Pileus
- Sailor cap
- Shako
- Smoking cap
- Sou'wester, or "Cape Ann" – a flexible waterproof hat traditionally worn by sailors
- Whoopee cap – a style of headwear popular among youths in the mid 20th century in the United States

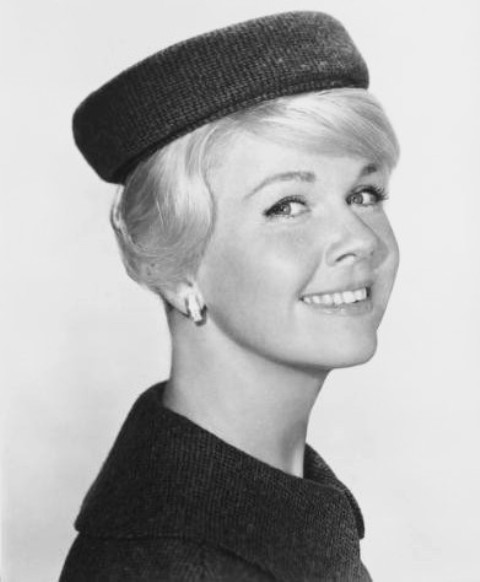
Actress Doris Day in a pillbox cap

=== Caps worn by women in the past ===
- Boudoir cap
- Icelandic tail-cap
- Juliet cap
- Mob-cap
- Nightcap
- Pillbox cap
- Pinner

=== Caps worn on ceremonial occasions ===
- Black cap
- Cap of maintenance

== Bonnets ==
=== Bonnets for women ===
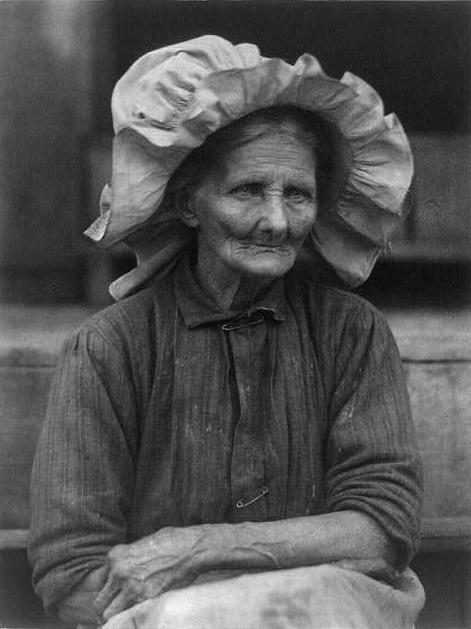
Old woman in sunbonnet (c. 1930). Photograph by Doris Ulmann

- Cabriolet
- Capote – soft crown, rigid brim, nineteenth century
- Chip bonnet
- Gypsy bonnet – shallow to flat crown, saucer shaped, and worn by tying it on with either a scarf or sash, under the chin, or at the nape of the neck – nineteenth Century
- Kiss-me-quick
- Leghorn bonnet
- Mourning bonnet
- Poke bonnet – Early nineteenth century, "Christmas Carol" style, with a cylindrical crown and broad funnel brim
- Ugly – a kind of retractable visor that could be attached to bonnets for extra protection from the sun, nineteenth century

=== Bonnets for men ===
- Balmoral bonnet
- Blue bonnet, the ancestor of the Balmoral, feather, Glengarry and other men's bonnets
- Feather bonnet
- Glengarry bonnet
- Tam o'shanter

== Hoods ==
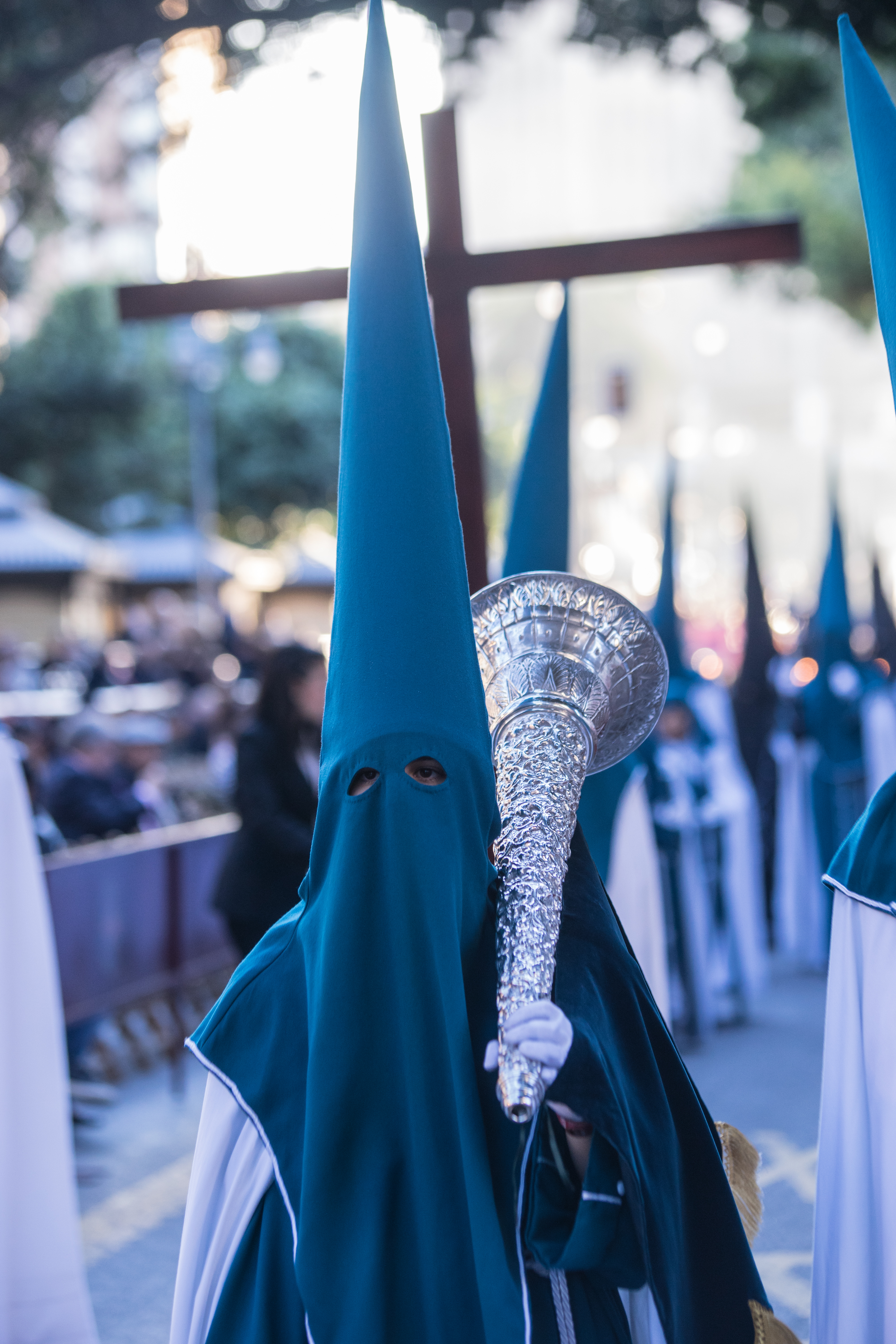
Capirote during procession, exist in various colours

- Bashlyk
- Bongrace, the stiffened back of the hood when flipped over the forehead to provide shade; also a separate headdress to provide shade, worn with a hood or coif, Tudor/Elizabethan
- Bonnet head
- Capirote, traditionally worn by the Nazarenos of a Spanish Brotherhood during solemn penitence
- Chaperon (headgear) adaptable late Middle Ages "dead-chicken" hood and hat
- Flemish hood
- French hood
- Gable hood
- Hood – modern or historical, attached to tops or shirts, overcoats, cloaks, etc.
- Liripipe
- Mary Queen of Scots
- Medieval hood
- Mourning hood
- Riding hood
- Stuart hood

== Headbands, headscarves, wimples ==
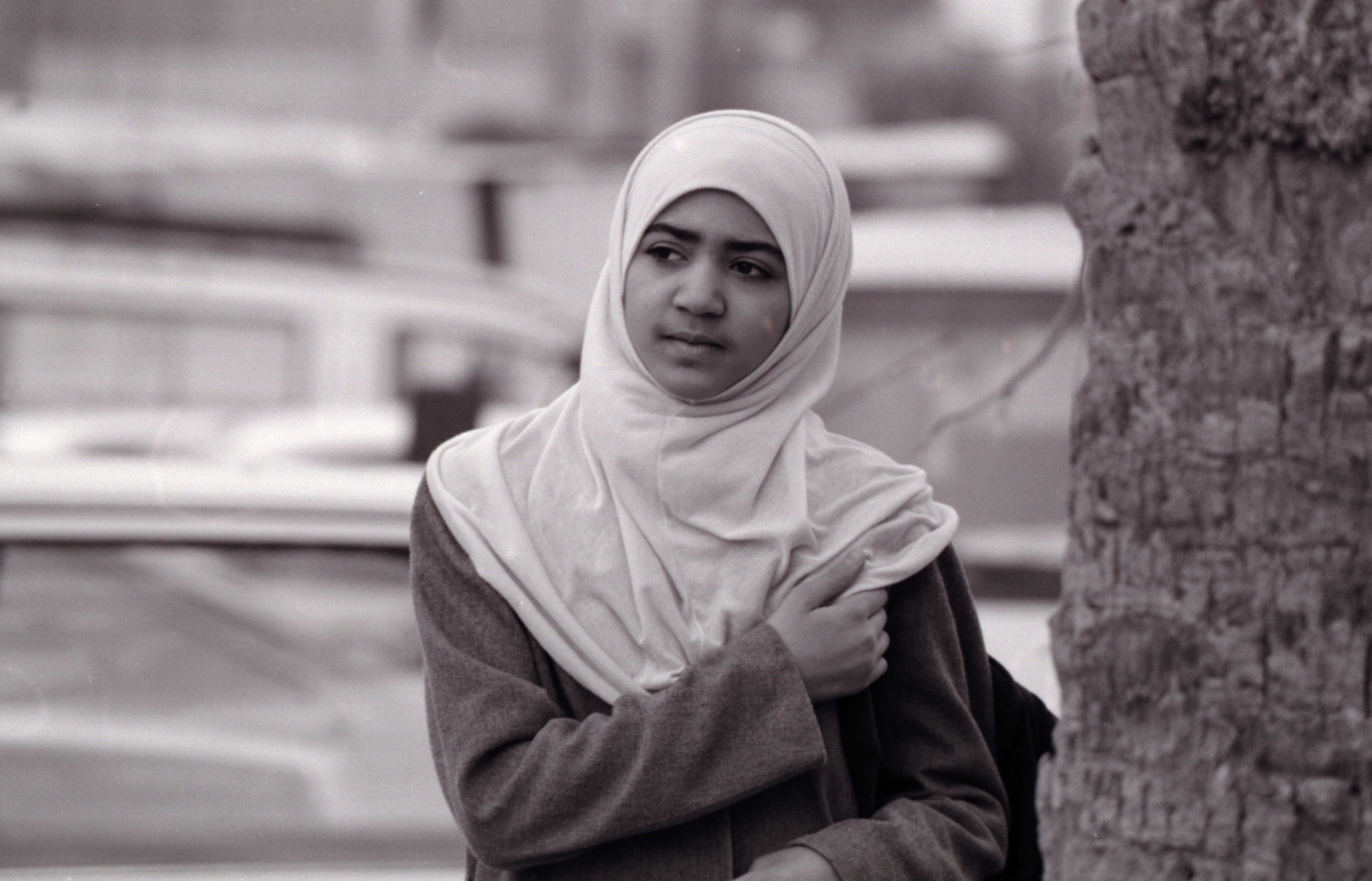
An Iraqi girl wearing a headscarf in downtown Baghdad (April 2005)

- Abaya
- Buknuk
- Chador
- Chaperon (headgear) adaptable late Middle Ages "dead-chicken" hat, hood and scarf
- Coif
- Crispine thirteenth century European women's style of padding hair in a net and headband
- Dupatta, also shayla or milfeh
- Headband
- Headscarf, also khimar or hijab
- Khimar
- Liripipe
- Mandily (Greek Orthodox)
- Nemes
- Snood
- Veil
- Wimple

== Masks, veils and headgear that covers the face ==
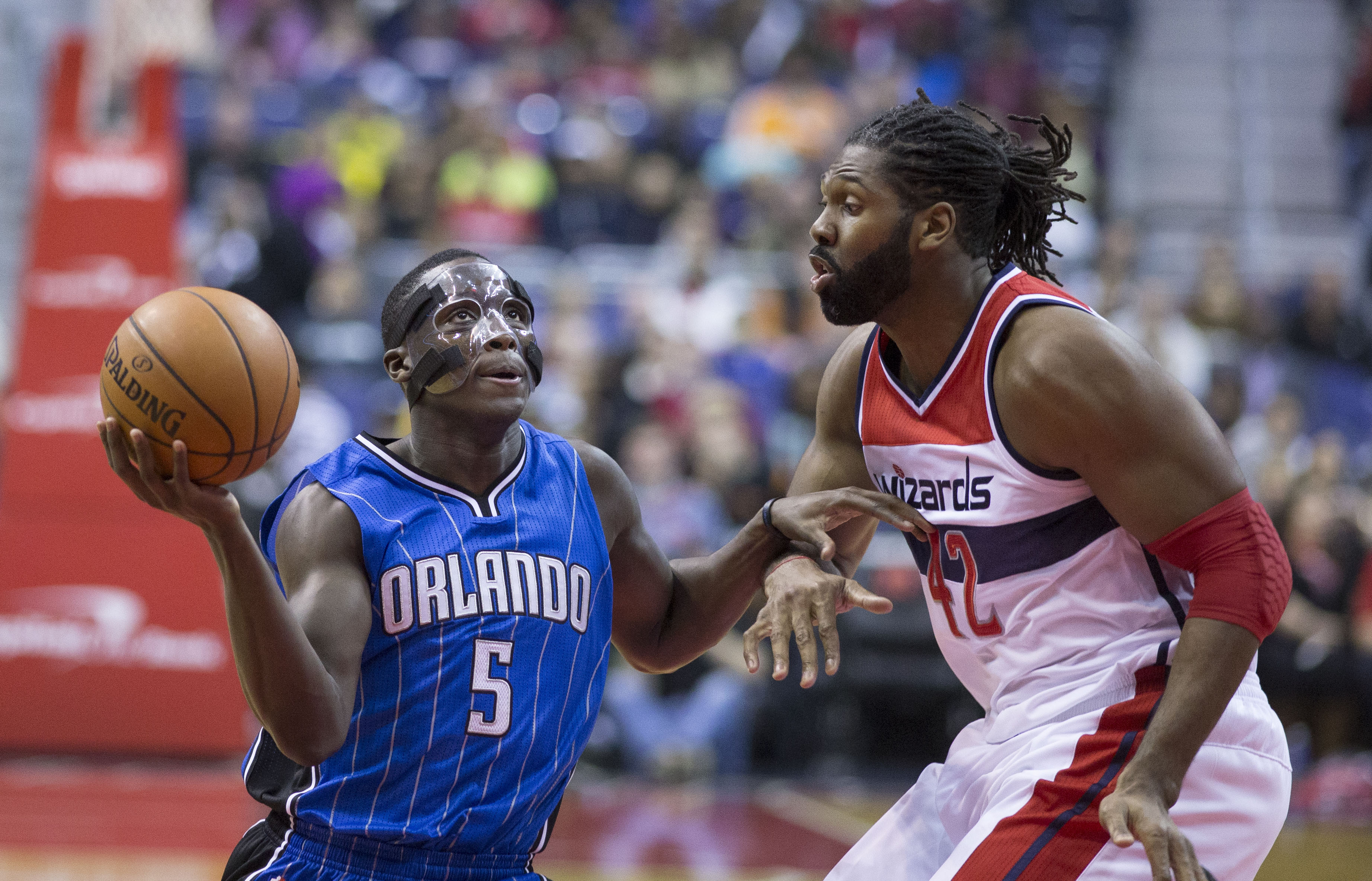
Victor Oladipo wearing protective headgear

- See Mask for a fuller list of masks.
- Balaclava (helmet) or ski mask
- Battoulah
- Bongrace – a shade for the face, sometimes part of a hood, or a separate garment worn with a hood or coif; Tudor/Elizabethan
- Boushiya
- Burqa, also burka, burga, burqua
- Diving mask
- Full-face diving mask
- Gas mask
- Orthodontic facemask

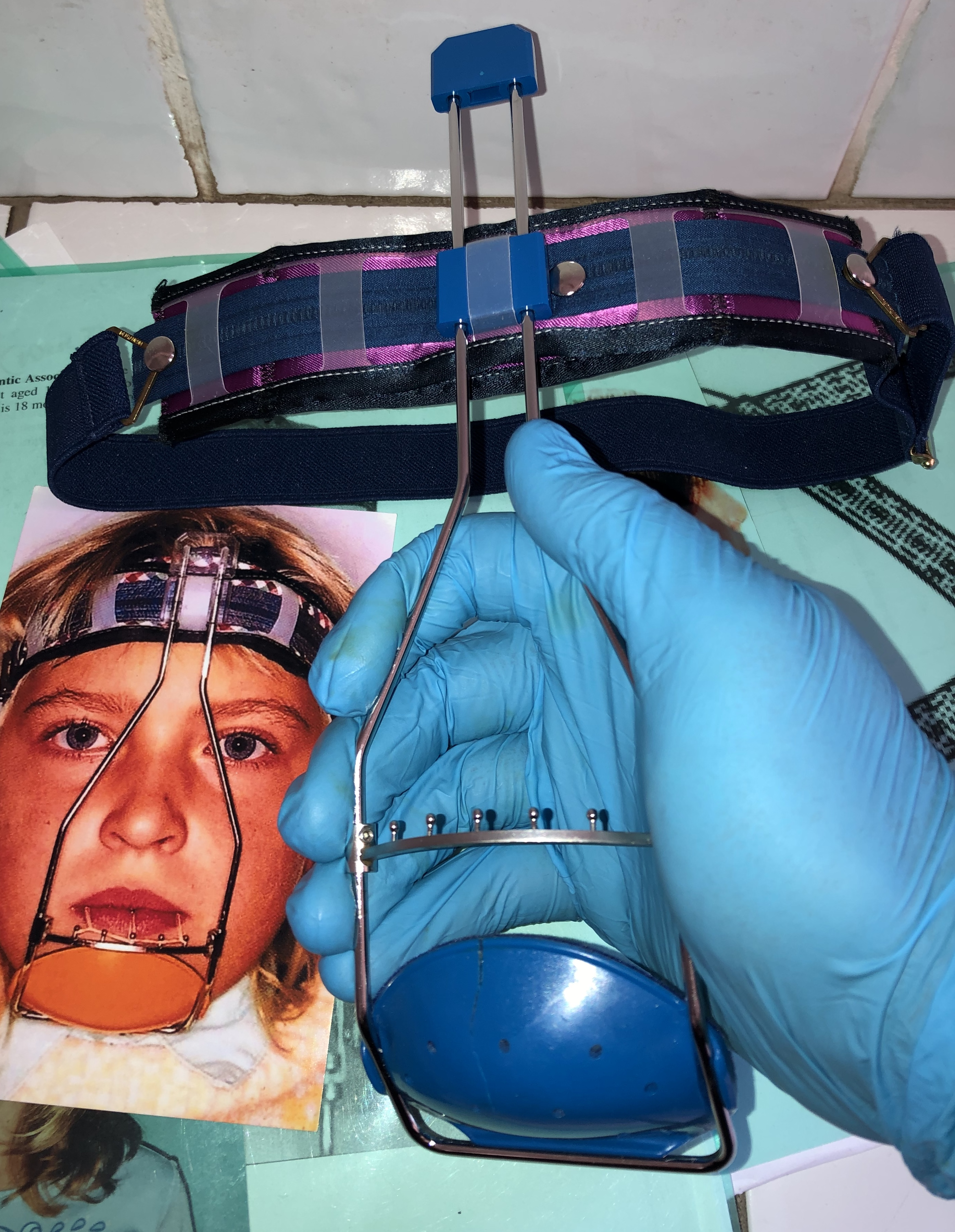
Orthodontic facemask being prepared for fitting to this adolescent female patient – 16 hours daily wear

- Latex mask
- Litham
- Niqab
- Tagelmust, also cheich
- Tudong
- Veil
- Visor
- Wedding veil

== Other headdress ==
=== Women's ===
- Alice band
- Bandanna
- Bandeau
- Fascinator
- Perak
- Visor
- Wreath
- Gele

=== Men's ===
- Arab headdress
  - Keffiyeh, also called a ghutrah or shemagh
  - Igal
- Bandana, also bandanna
- Do-rag
- Jamana, Kurdish headgear
- Stocking cap
- Topor – Bengali men's wedding headgear
- Upe
- Visor

== Jeweled ==
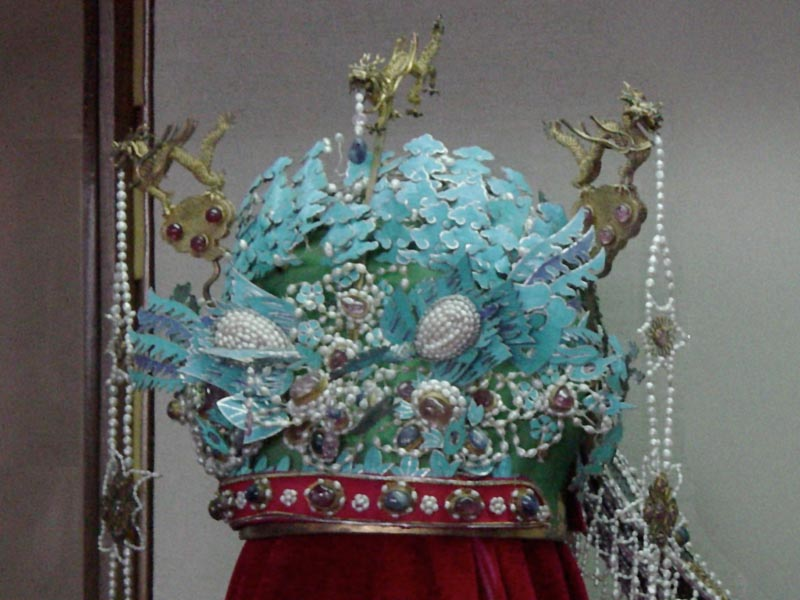
Ming Dynasty queen's headdress with cloisonné, pearls, gems, and gold

- Coronet
- Crown
  - Holy Crown of Hungary
  - Imperial Crown of India
  - Imperial State Crown
  - St Edward's Crown
- Diadem
- Tiara
  - Papal tiara

== Wigs ==
- Toupee
- Wig

== Headgear organised by function ==
=== Religious ===
==== Buddhist ====
- Black Crown of the Karma Kagyu sect
- Kasa
- Pan Zva (Hat with the long ears from the Pandita of Nyingma.)

==== Christian ====
- Biretta
- Camauro
- Canterbury cap
- Cappello romano
- Galero
- Jijin
- Kalimavkion
- Klobuk
- Kolpak
- Koukoulion
- Mantilla
- Mitre
- Papal tiara
- Skufia
- Wimple
- Zucchetto

==== Hindu ====
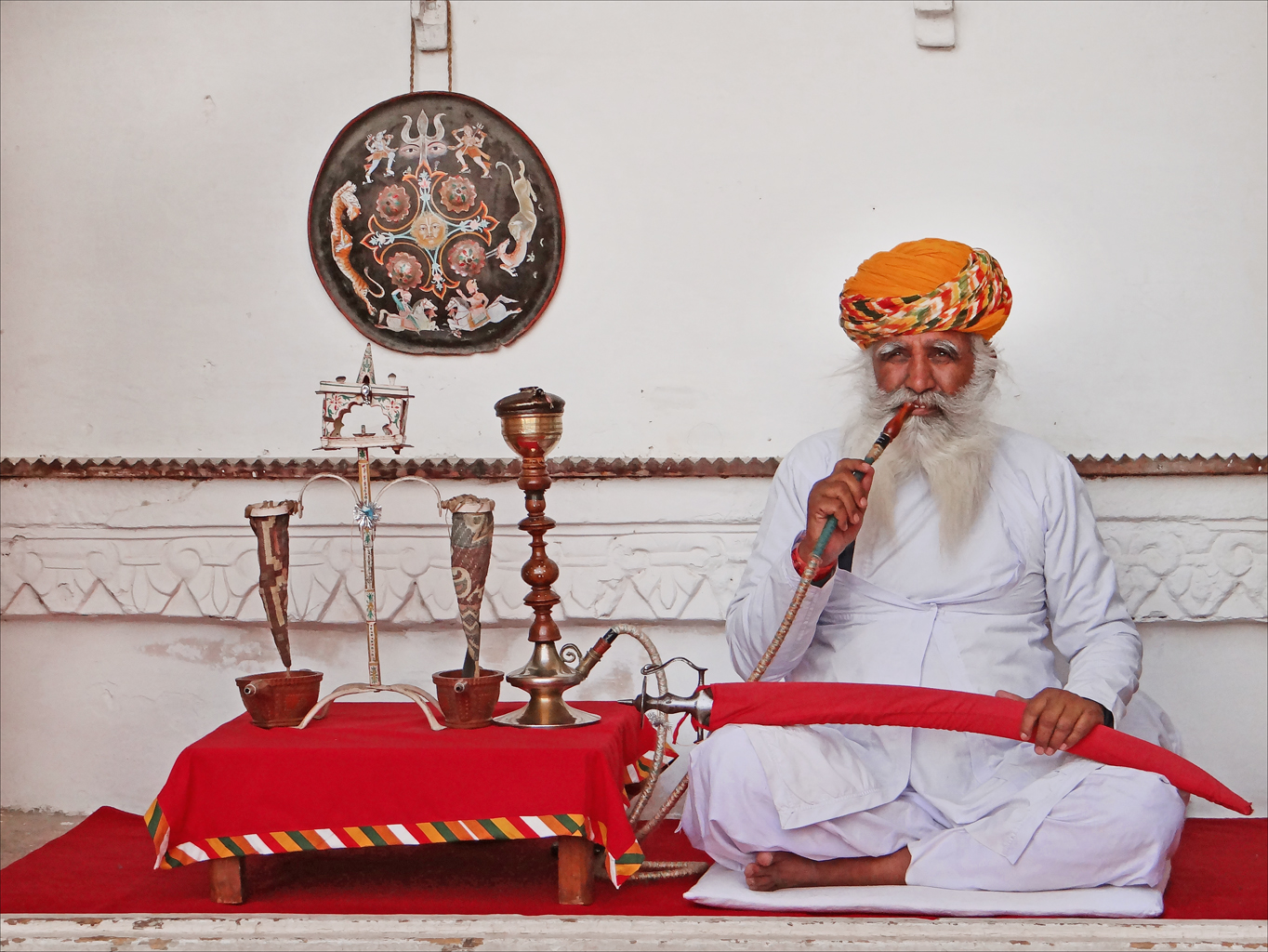
Old Rajput man poses for visitors with a sword on his knees in the palace of Maharaja (Mehrangarh Fort)

- Mukut – Crown worn by Hindu deities
- Pagri – Indian Hindu turban
- Pheta – Marathi turban
- Rasam Pagri – religious ceremony of the turban
- Sarpech – ornament worn with turban

==== Jewish ====
- Havalim (חֲבָליִם) ropes that are referenced in Kings I 20:31. Used as a sign of mourning.
- Kashket
- Kippah or yarmulke
- Kolpik
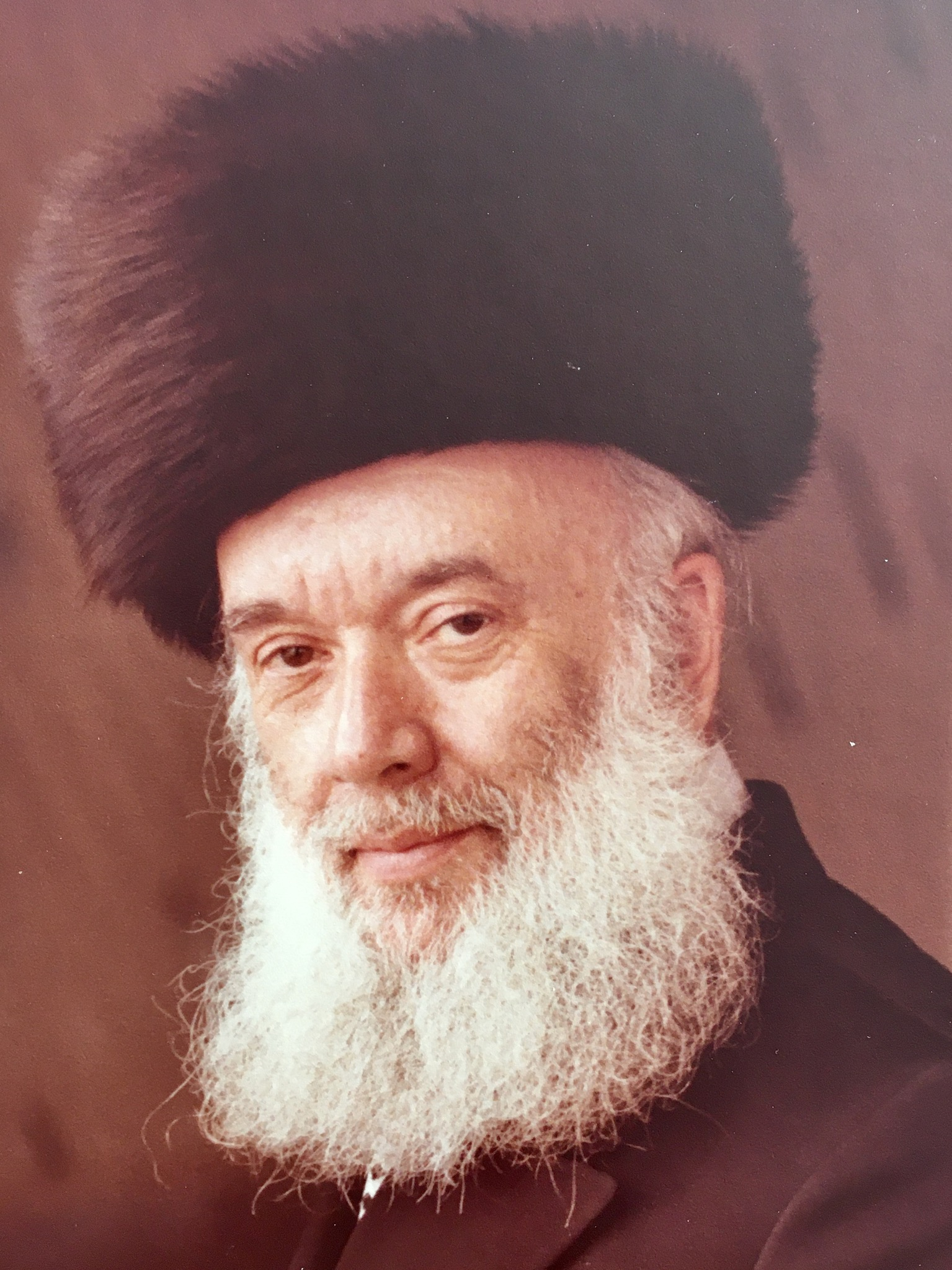
- A rabbi in a kolpik
  Migba'at was likely a cone-shaped Turban. This turban was likely only worn in the context of the priesthood and is cited in Exodus 27:20–30.
- Mitpaḥat is a scarf that is worn on the head or hair, by some married women. Some wear scarves only during prayers, and others wear them in public.
- Mitznefet was most likely a classic circular turban. This is derived from the fact that Hebrew word Mitznefet comes from the root "to wrap." This turban was likely only worn in the context of the priesthood and is cited in Exodus 27:20–30.
- Pe’er mentioned in Ezekiel 24: 17;23. In verse 17, Ezekiel commands the Israelites to “wrap their” Pe’ers around their heads. In verse 23, Ezekiel tells the Israelite that their Pe’er's "shall remain on your heads.” ("Pe'er" (which translates into "splendor") is usually used to refer to phylacteries (tefillin))
- Sheitel is a wig worn by some married women in order to maintain marital modesty in public
- Shtreimel
- Spodik
- Gargush
- Sudra (סודרא) is a headdress, similar to the keffiyah worn by Jewish men in the ancient near-east.

==== Muslim ====
- Fez
- Hijab
  - Types of hijab
- Kalpak
- Karakul
- Kofia
- Kufi
- Pakol
- Sharbush
- Sidara
- Songkok
- Taqiyah (cap)
- Telpek
- Tubeteika
- Turban
- Khimar

==== Sikh ====
- Sikh turban
- Patka
- Rumal
- Dumalla
- Taksali Dumalla
- Patiala Shahi
- Vattan Wali

A Native American man in a feathered war bonnet

=== Military and police ===
- Barretina
- Bearskin
- Beefeaters' hat
- Beret
- Bersagliere
- Bicorne
- Boonie hat
- Busby
- Campaign hat, also drill instructor hat, drill sergeant hat, ranger hat, sergeant hat, Smokey Bear hat
- Cap comforter, a woollen hat associated with British Commandos
- Cappello Alpino, hat worn by the Alpini troops of the Italian Army
- Caubeen
- Chapeau-bras, also chapeau de bras – 18th to early-19th-century folding bicorne hat carried under one arm
- Combination cap, also service cap, combination cover, peaked cap
- Custodian helmet, headwear of the British police officer, ranks of Sergeant and Constable
- Czapka
- Fur wedge cap "Envelope Busby" or Astrakhan, worn by Officer Cadets of the Royal Military College of Canada
- Feather bonnet
- Flying helmet – closely fitting solid helmet designed to resist impacts within the cockpit of military aircraft – colloquially known as a 'bone dome'
- Garrison cap, also campaign cap, wedge cap, flight cap, garrison hat, overseas cap, side cap, field service cap
- Glengarry, also Glengarry bonnet, Glengarry cap
- Hardee hat
- Helmet
- Jeep cap
- Kartus – a peakless cap worn by the Swedish army during the Great Northern War. Called the Kabuds by the Danish and Norwegians and the Kartooze by the Russians, nations which also adopted it
- Kepi
- Mirliton – a high tubular concave hat with a "wing", worn by hussars in the 18th and early 19th centuries
- Mitre
- Patrol cap
- Pickelhaube – a spiked German leather helmet.
- Sailor cap, also known as "white hat" or "dixie cup" in the US Navy
- Shako
- Shaguma – Yak-hair headdress used by early Imperial Japanese Army generals
- Slouch hat – One side of hat droops down as opposed to the other which is pinned against the side of the crown
- Tarleton Cap – A leather helmet with a large crest. Popular with cavalry and light infantry in the late 18th and early 19th century. Named after British military commander, Banastre Tarleton.
- Tricorn – Three-cornered hat synonymous with the 18th century. Worn by musketeers, dragoons and cuirassiers of all western armies, also often by French grenadiers (which was uncommon considering that most grenadiers at the time wore mitres or bearskins).
- War bonnet, the feathered headdress worn warriors and chiefs of Plains Indians.
- Military tiara – a tiara worn by female members of the United States Armed Forces for formal occasions.

=== Officials and civil workers ===
==== China (historical) ====
- Tang official headwear
- Song official headwear
- Qing official headwear
- Futou

==== Vietnam (historical) ====
- Phốc Đầu

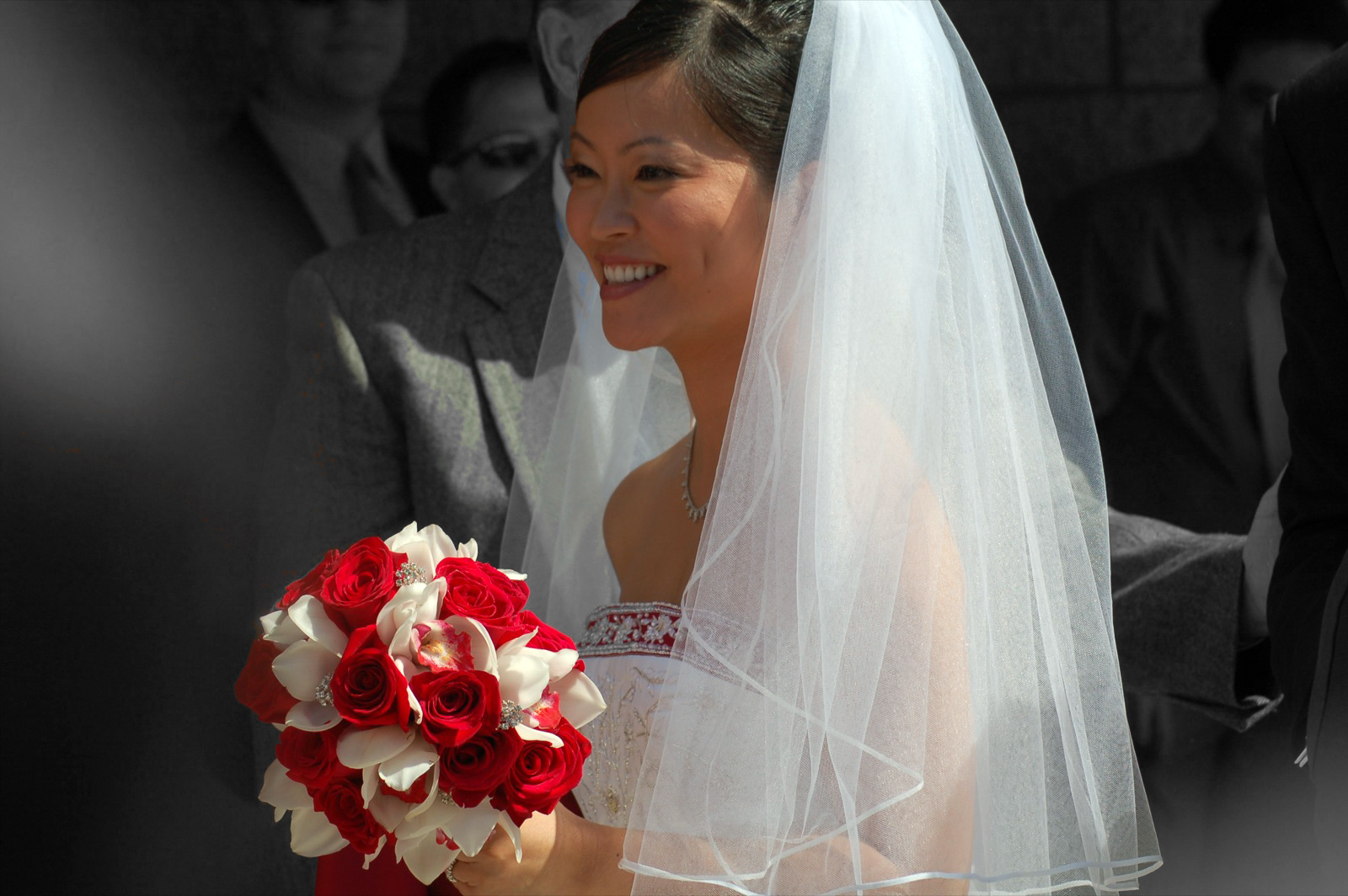
A bride wearing a wedding veil

=== Other specialist headgear ===
- Casquette, or cycling cap
- Chef's hat, also toque blanche, or more familiarly, toque
- Coronet
- Cowboy hat
- Crown
- Cucupha
- Energy dome
- Firefighter's helmet
- Gas mask
- Green eyeshade
- Headlamp
- Night cap
- Nurse's cap
- Orthodontic headgear
- Party hat
- Printer's hat also pressman's hat
- Propeller hat (propeller beanie)
- Santa's hat
- Rubber boot, unique signature headgear of American political figure Vermin Supreme
- Scrum cap
- Shower cap, a flexible plastic covering to keep the hair dry during a shower.
- Space helmet
- Square academic cap
- Stormy Kromer cap
- Swimming cap, also "swim cap" and "bathing cap"
- Tin foil hat
- Topor – Bengali men's wedding headgear
- Visor
- Watermelon helmet
- Wedding veil

=== National dress; association with a country, people and religion ===
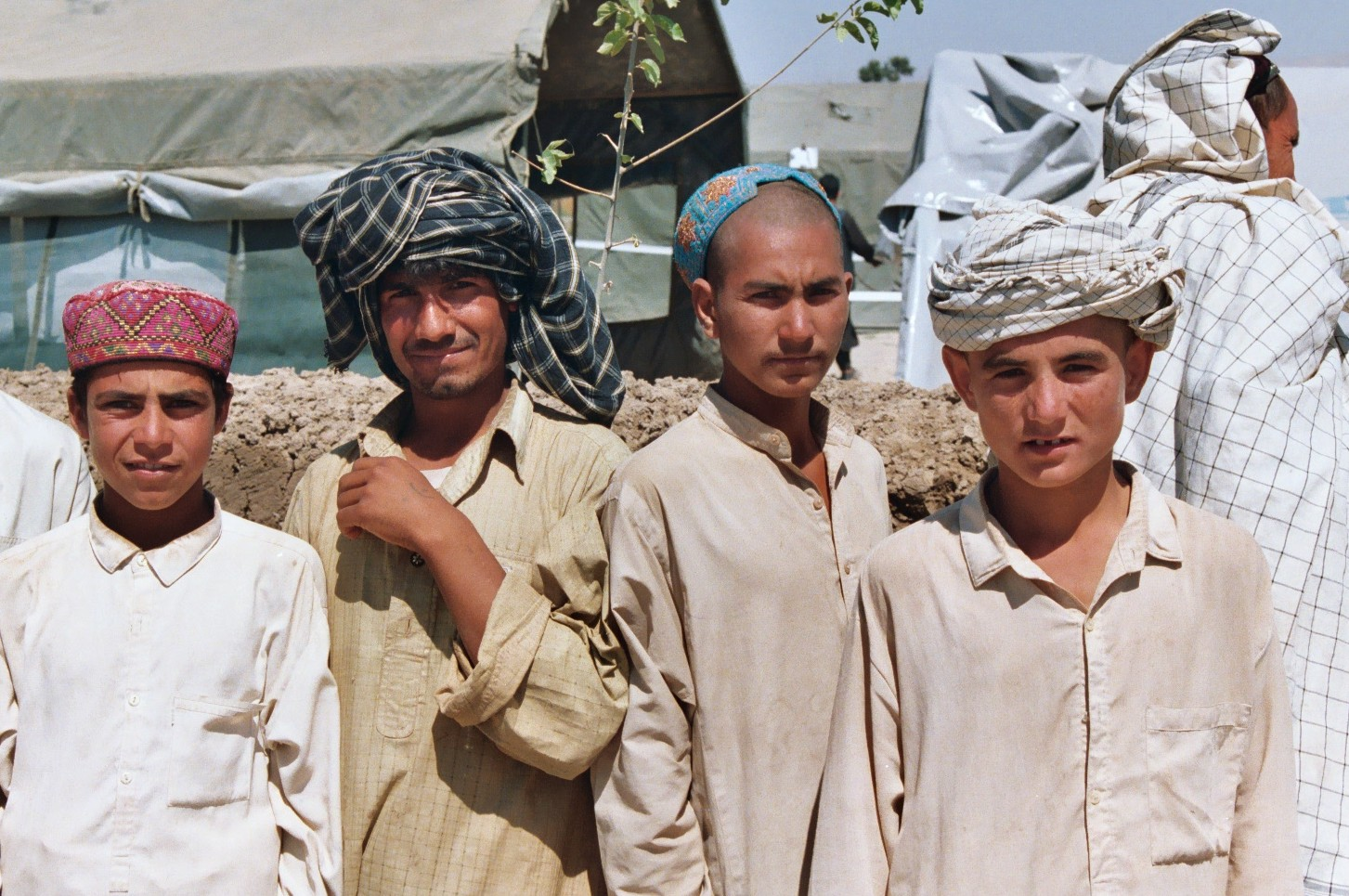
Afghan boys wearing traditional headgear. Kunduz, Afghanistan (June 2003).

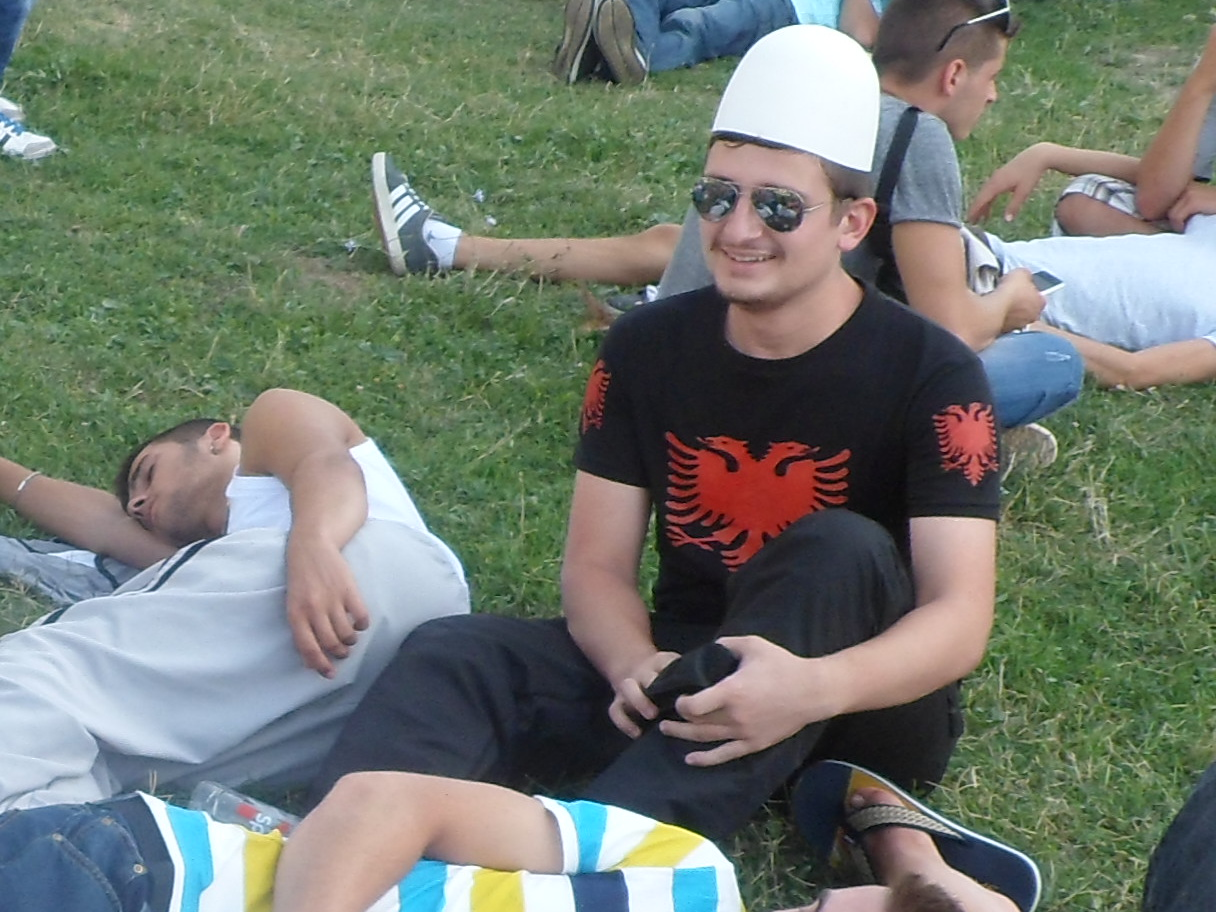
A young Albanian wearing Qeleshe (also called Plis)

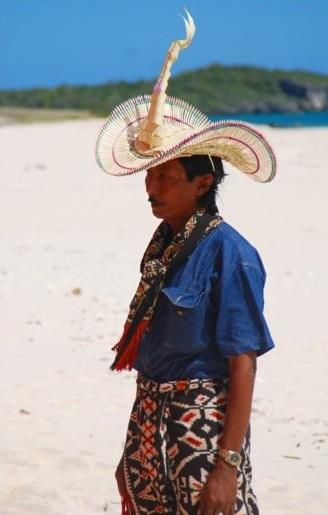
Ti'i langga, a Rote islander attempt to copy the 16th-century European headgear

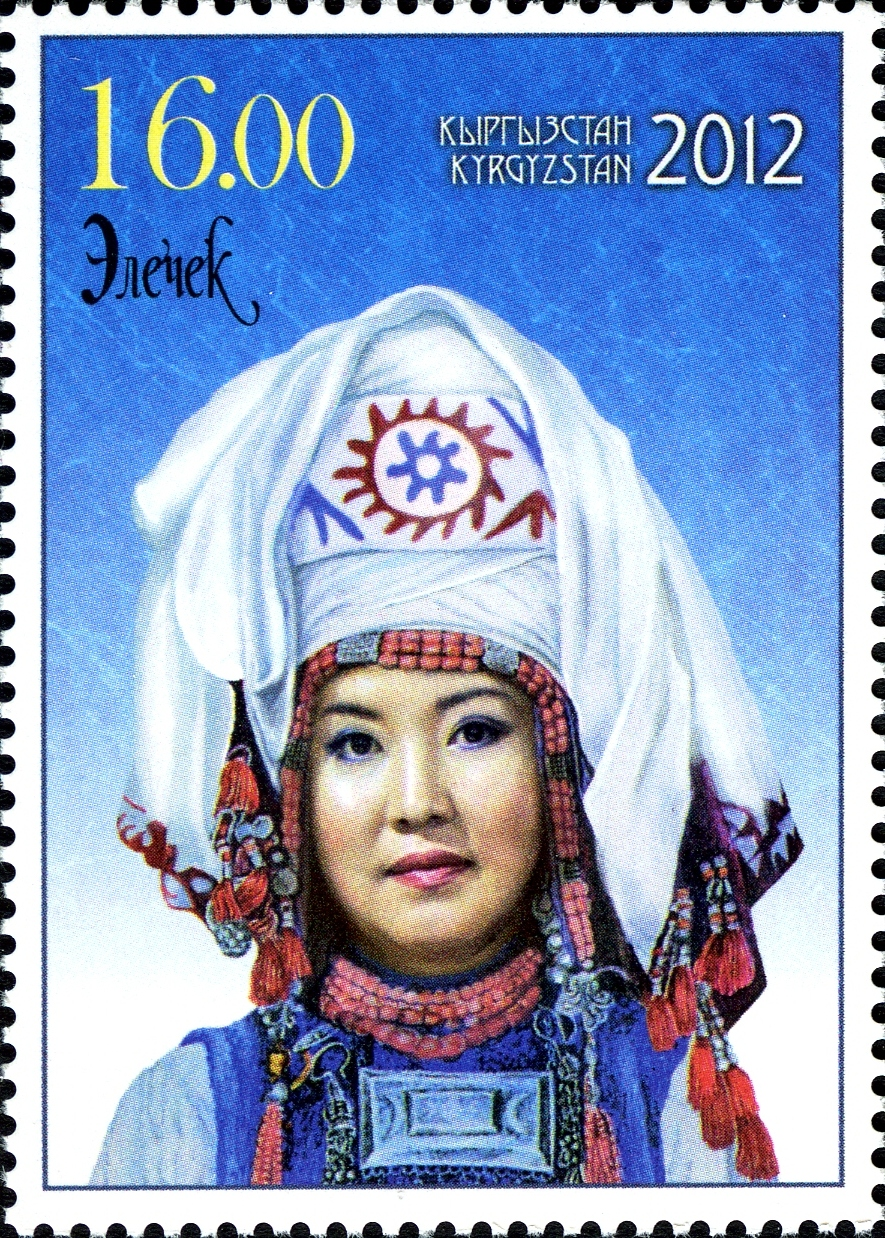
A stamp with an illustration of a Kyrgyz woman in a Kimeshek

- Aso Oke Hat – Yoruba people
- Barretina – Catalan
- Bearskin hat
- Beret – French, Basque
- Bhatgaunle Topi – Nepal
- Blangkon – Javanese
- Breton, also Bretonne
- Chupalla – Chilean
- Chullo – Peruvian
- Clop – Romanian
- Coolie hat
- Coonskin hat – American frontiersman
- Cork hat – Australia
- Cossack hat
- Dogon hat – Dogon people, West Africa
- Feathered headdress – Native American
- Flat cap – English people and Irish people
- Four Winds hat – Sami people
- Fulani hat – Fula people, West Africa
- Glengarry bonnet
- Għonnella or Faldetta – Maltese
- Haida hat
- Irish walking hat – Irish people
- Kimeshek – Kazakhstan, Karakalpakstan and Kyrgyzstan
- Kofia – Swahili people, East Africa
- Kufi – West Africa
- Leopard cap – Igbo people, West Africa
- Mandarin hat – Chinese
- Mokorotlo – Basotho/Lesotho
- Montenegrin cap – Montenegrins, Serbs
- Lungee (Afghan Turban) – Pashtun people, Afghanistan
- Pakol – Pashtun people, Afghanistan
- Phrygian cap – Roman, French
- Qeleshe – Albanian
- Šajkača – Serbian
- Salakot – Filipino
- Shreepech – Traditional Crown of Monarch of Nepal
- Slouch hat, also digger hat, Australia and New Zealand
- Songkok – Malay-speaking peoples of Indonesia, Malaysia, Brunei and Singapore
- Tam o'shanter – Scottish
- Tengkolok – Malaysia, Brunei, Indonesia and Singapore
- Tarboosh
- Tembel hat – Israel
- Ti'i langga – Rote Island
- Top hat – English
- Topor – Bengali men's wedding headgear
- Turban
- Tuque or toque – Canadian, esp. French-Canadian/Québécois
- Upe – Bougainville
- Ushanka – Russian
- Welsh hat
- Witch hat – Galician
- Zmijovka – Czech
- Zulu crown – Zulu people, Southern Africa, see kufi for information

== By ethnicity ==
=== Chinese ===
- Futou
- Guan – mianguan, fengguan, pibian, tongtianguan
- Liangmao
- List of Hanfu headwear
- Weimao
- Damao
- Humao

=== Filipino ===
- Salakot
- Vakul

=== Japanese ===
- Kasa

=== Korean ===
- Jokduri
- Gat
- Beonggeoji

=== Mongol ===
- Boli hat
- Gugu hat

=== Vietnamese ===
- Ba tầm
- Đinh Tự
- Nón lá
- Khăn vấn
- Phốc Đầu

=== Yoruba ===
- Gele (headdress)
- Fila

== See also ==
- List of hat styles
- Pointy hat
- The Philippi Collection
- Jaapi
- Asian conical hat
- List of fur headgear
