= Asian conical hat =

Cone-shaped hat worn in parts of Asia

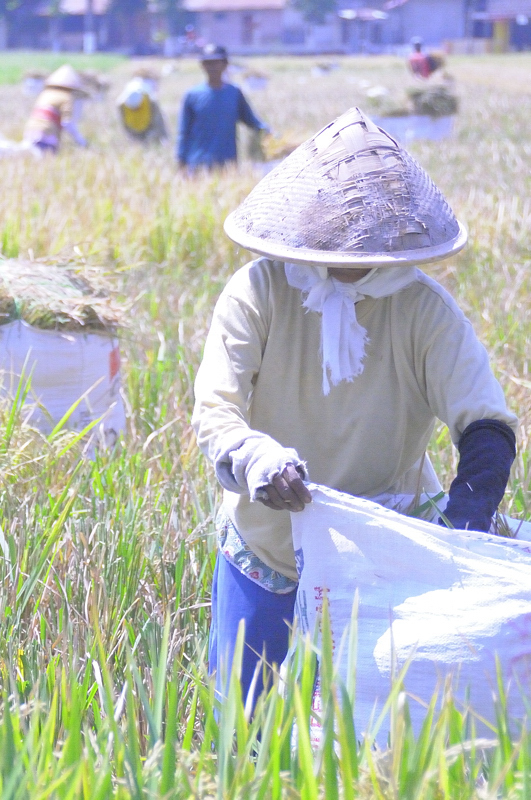
Caping worn by a farmer in Indonesia

The Asian conical hat is a style of conically shaped sun hat worn in Bangladesh, Bhutan, Cambodia, China, Indonesia, Japan, Korea, Laos, Malaysia, India, Myanmar, Nepal, the Philippines, Taiwan, Thailand, and Vietnam. It is kept on the head by a cloth or fiber chin strap, an inner headband, or both.

== Regional names ==
In East Asia it is called dǒulì (斗笠, meaning a "one-dǒu bamboo hat") in China; kasa (笠) in Japan; and satgat (삿갓) in Korea.

English terms for the hat include bamboo hat, Chinese hat, coolie hat, paddy hat, rice hat, sedge hat.

In Southeast Asia, it is known as do'un (ដួន) in Cambodia; caping or seraung in Indonesia; koup (ກຸບ) in Laos; terendak or siung in Malaysia; khamauk (ခမောက်) in Myanmar; salakót (ᜐᜎᜃᜓᜆ᜔), sarók, sadók, s'laong, hallidung, kallugong, and tabungaw among other names in the Philippines; ngop (งอบ) in Thailand; and nón tơi or nón lá in Vietnam.

In South Asia, it is known as jaapi in Assam (India), chattri in Terai (Nepal), talari in Orissa (India); in Bangladesh it is known as mathal (মাথাল).

Country	Local name	In Native Script
India (Assam)	Jaapi	জাপি
Nepal (Terai)	Chattri	छत्री
Bangladesh	Mathal	মাথাল
Cambodia	Do'un	ដួន
China	Dǒulì	斗笠
Indonesia	Caping, Seraung	Caping, Seraung
Japan	Kasa	笠
Korea	Satgat	삿갓
Laos	Koup	ກຸບ
Malaysia	Terendak, Siung	تريندق
Myanmar	Khamauk	ခမောက်
Philippines	Salakót	ᜐᜎᜃᜓᜆ᜔
Taiwan	kue-le̍h-á	瓜笠仔/kue-le̍h-á
Thailand	Ngop	งอบ
Vietnam	Nón lá, Nón tơi	Nón lá, Nón tơi

== Use ==
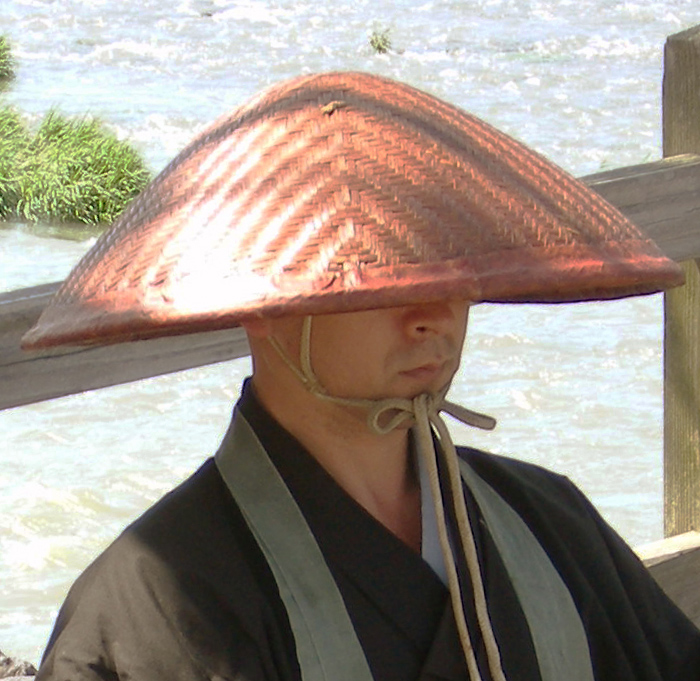
A straw cone hat worn by a Japanese Buddhist monk

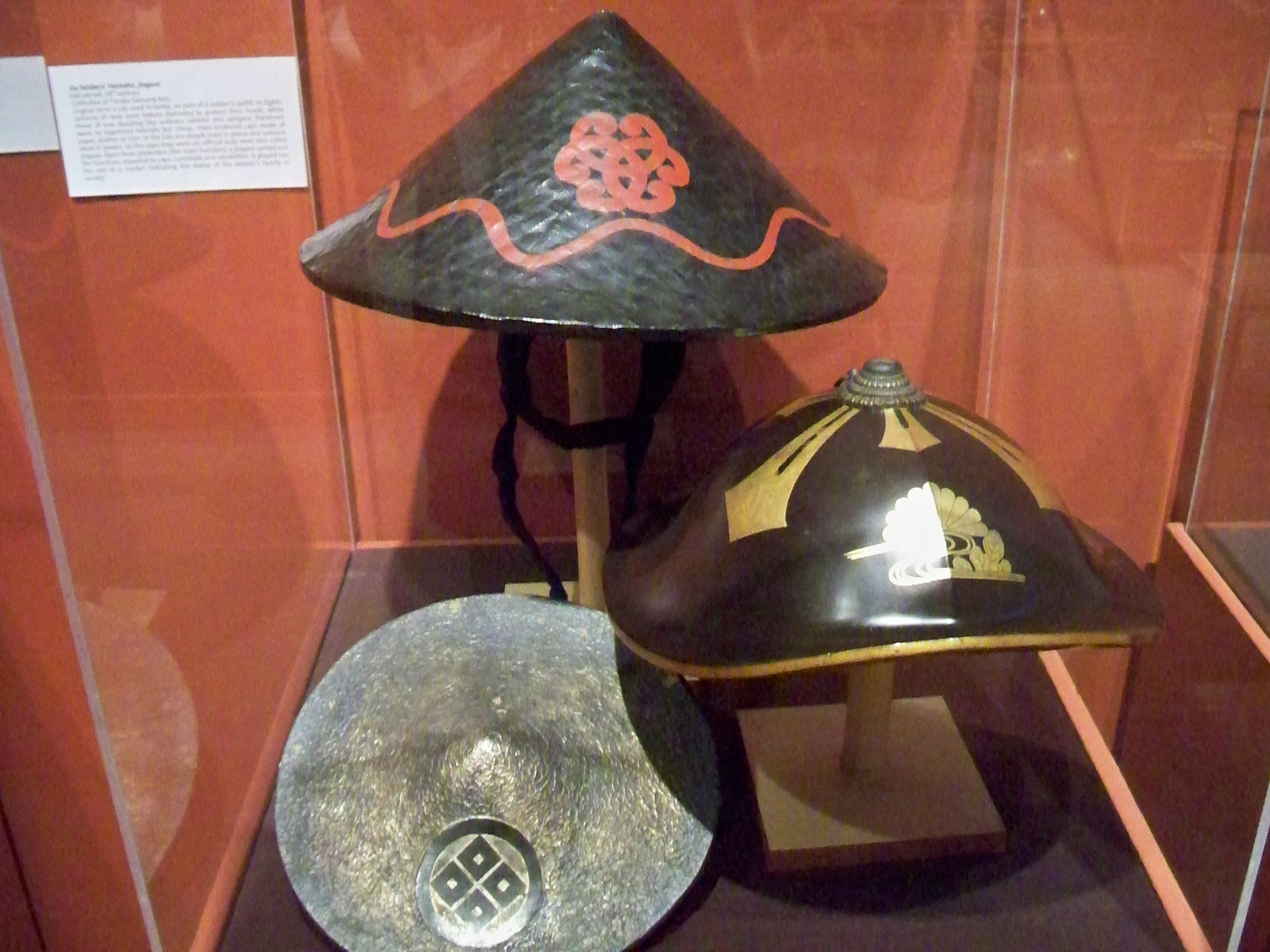
Japanese jingasa worn by samurai

Types of Japanese hats

Asian conical hats are, throughout Asia, primarily used as a form of protection from the sun and rain. When made of straw or other woven materials, it can be dipped in water and worn as an impromptu evaporative cooling device.

=== China ===
In China, conical hats were typically associated with farmers, while mandarins wore tighter circular caps, especially in the winter. There were several conical hat types worn during the Qing dynasty (see Qing official headwear).

=== Japan ===
It is also widely understood in East Asia, most notably Japan, where they were known as kasa, as a symbol of Buddhism, as it is traditionally worn by pilgrims and Buddhist monks in search of alms.

Sturdier, even metal, variants, known as jingasa (battle kasa), were also worn by samurai and foot-soldiers in Japan, as helmets.

=== Malaysia ===
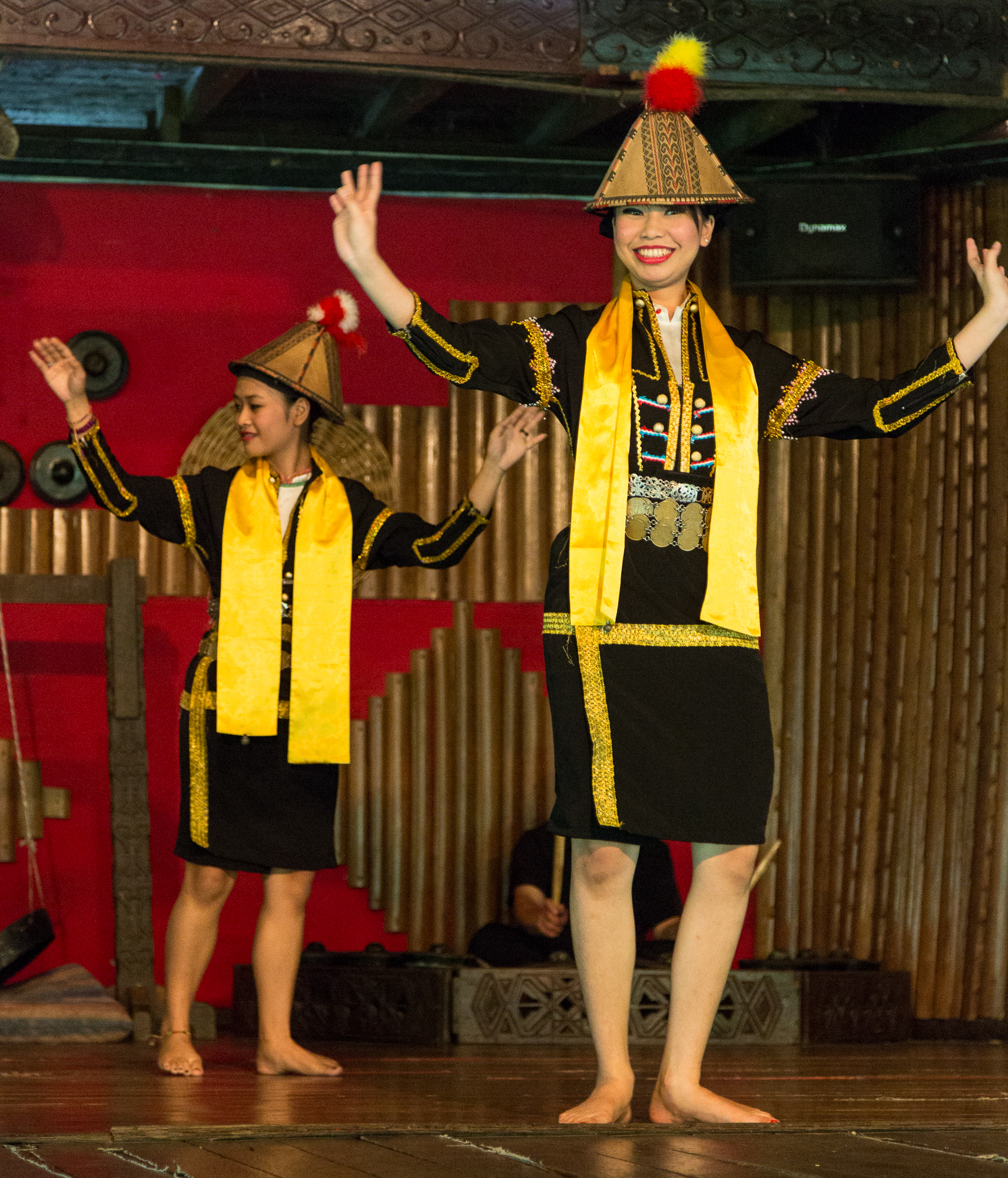
Sumazau performances by Papar Kadazans with siung at the Monsopiad Heritage Village

In the Papar District of Sabah, the conical hat is worn during the sazau or sumazau dances during the harvest festival of Kaamatan by the Kadazan people, while it is also hung in homes as decoration. In the past, it was commonly worn by the Kadazan women of the Papar District for protection against sunlight and rain during their agricultural activities. Different types of siung also carry their respective meanings; for Kadazan sumandaks who are still unmarried, it is usually with feathers; the flower one usually means already married, while plain either means widowed, a grandmother or elderly. Another hint is the silver belt (antique British trade dollar); unmarried Kadazan women usually with four coins, while those married wear only two. The siung is further paired with black velvety fabric of sia with gold weave designs and a belt called ikat pinggang and dastar headdress with the same fabric.

=== Philippines ===
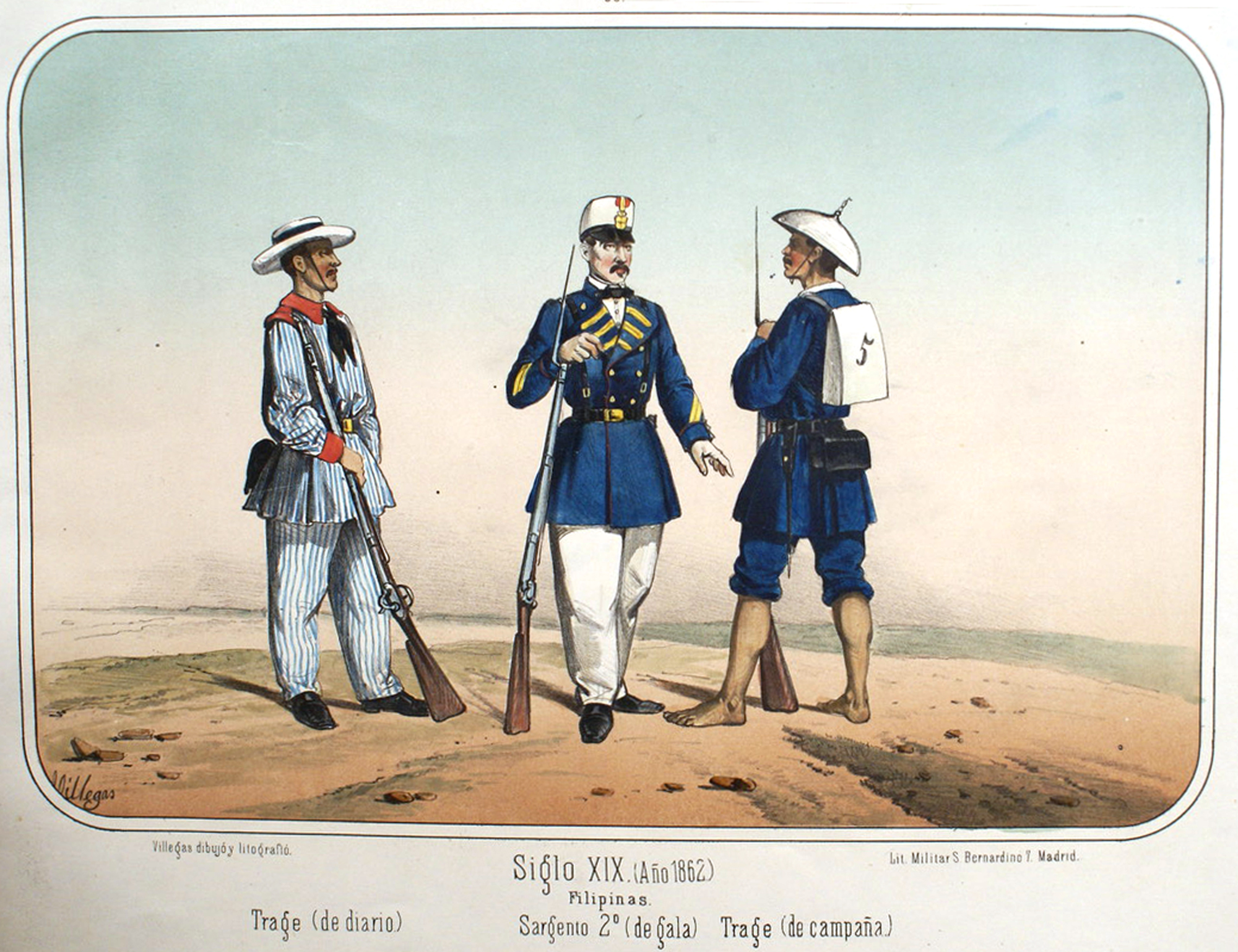
Spanish military uniforms in the Philippines in 1862 showing the salakot (right) worn as part of the traje de campaña (campaign uniform) and Rayadillo. This later evolved into pith helmet in British India.

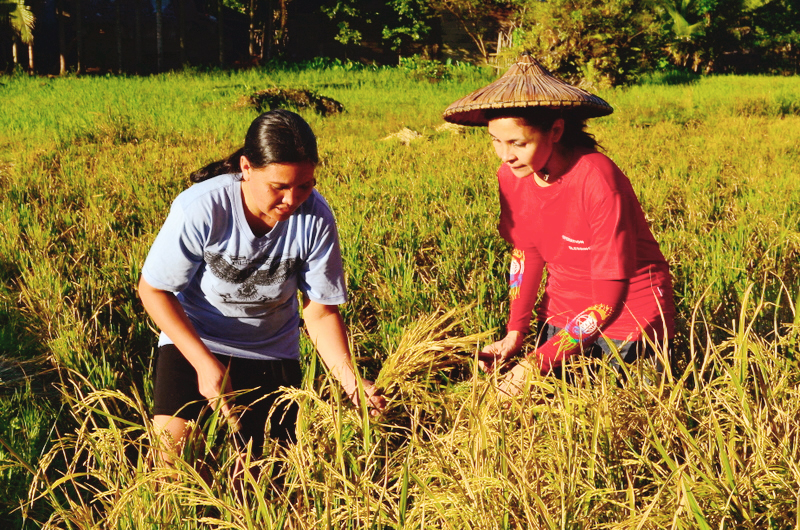
Filipina farmer wearing a salakot

In the Philippines, the salakót is more commonly a pointed dome-shape, rather than conical, with a spike or knob finial. Unlike most other mainland Asian conical hats, it is characterized by an inner headband in addition to a chinstrap. It can be made from various materials including bamboo, rattan, nito, bottle gourd, buri straw, nipa leaves, pandan leaves, and carabao horn. The plain type is typically worn by farmers, but nobles in the pre-colonial period (and later principalia in the Spanish period) crafted ornate variations with jewels, precious metals, or tortoiseshell. These are considered heirloom objects passed down from generation to generation within families.

The salakót was also commonly worn by native soldiers in the Spanish colonial army. It was adopted by Spanish troops in the early 18th century as part of their campaign uniform. In doing so, it became the direct precursor of the pith helmet (still called salacot or salacco in Spanish and French).

=== Vietnam ===
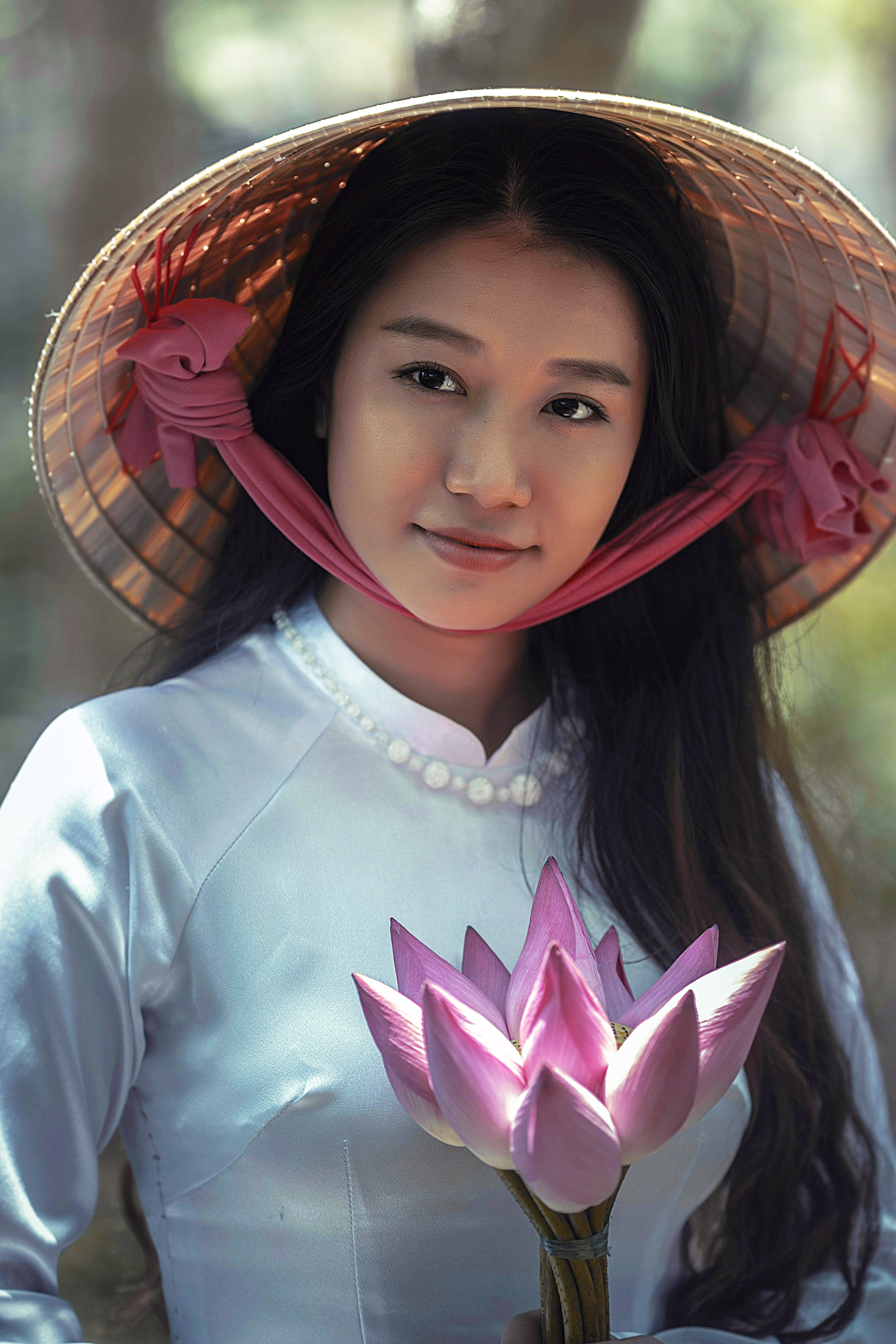
Nón lá - the most popular traditional head hat in Vietnam

In Vietnam, the nón lá, nón tơi ("hats"), nón gạo ("rice hat"), nón dang ("conical hat") or nón trúc ("bamboo hat") forms a perfect right circular cone which tapers smoothly from the base to the apex. Special conical hats in Vietnam contain colourful hand-stitch depictions or words. The Huế varieties are famous for their nón bài thơ (lit. poem conical hats) and contain random poetic verses and Chữ Hán, which can be revealed when the hat is directed above one's head in the sunlight. In modernity, they have become part of Vietnam's national costume.

=== Others ===
In India, and Bangladesh, the plain conical hat was worn by commoners during their daily work, but more decoratively-colored ones were used for festivities.

== Gallery ==
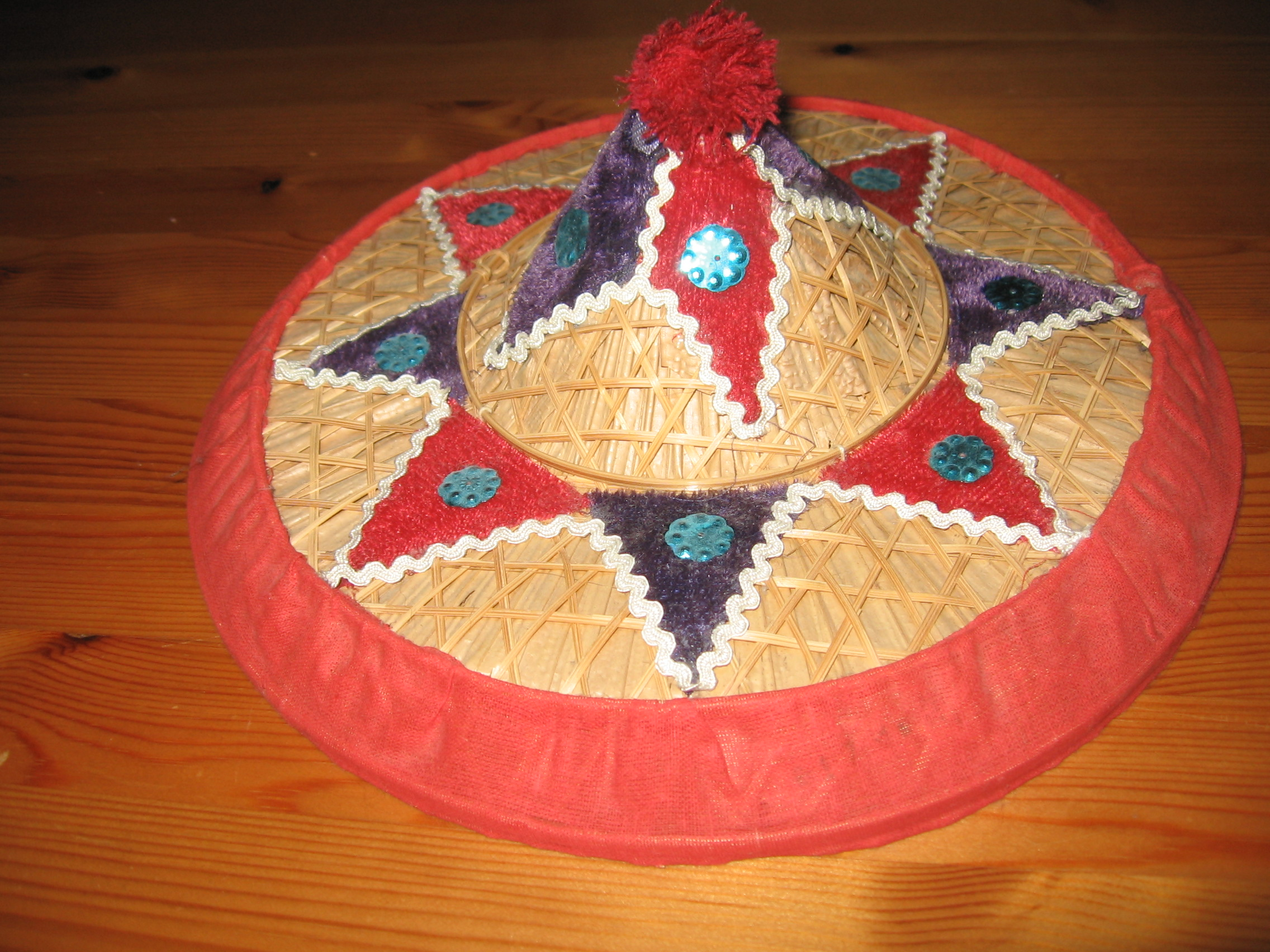
A decorative Assamese jaapi constructed with bamboo while the decorations are felt, threads and tin glitter

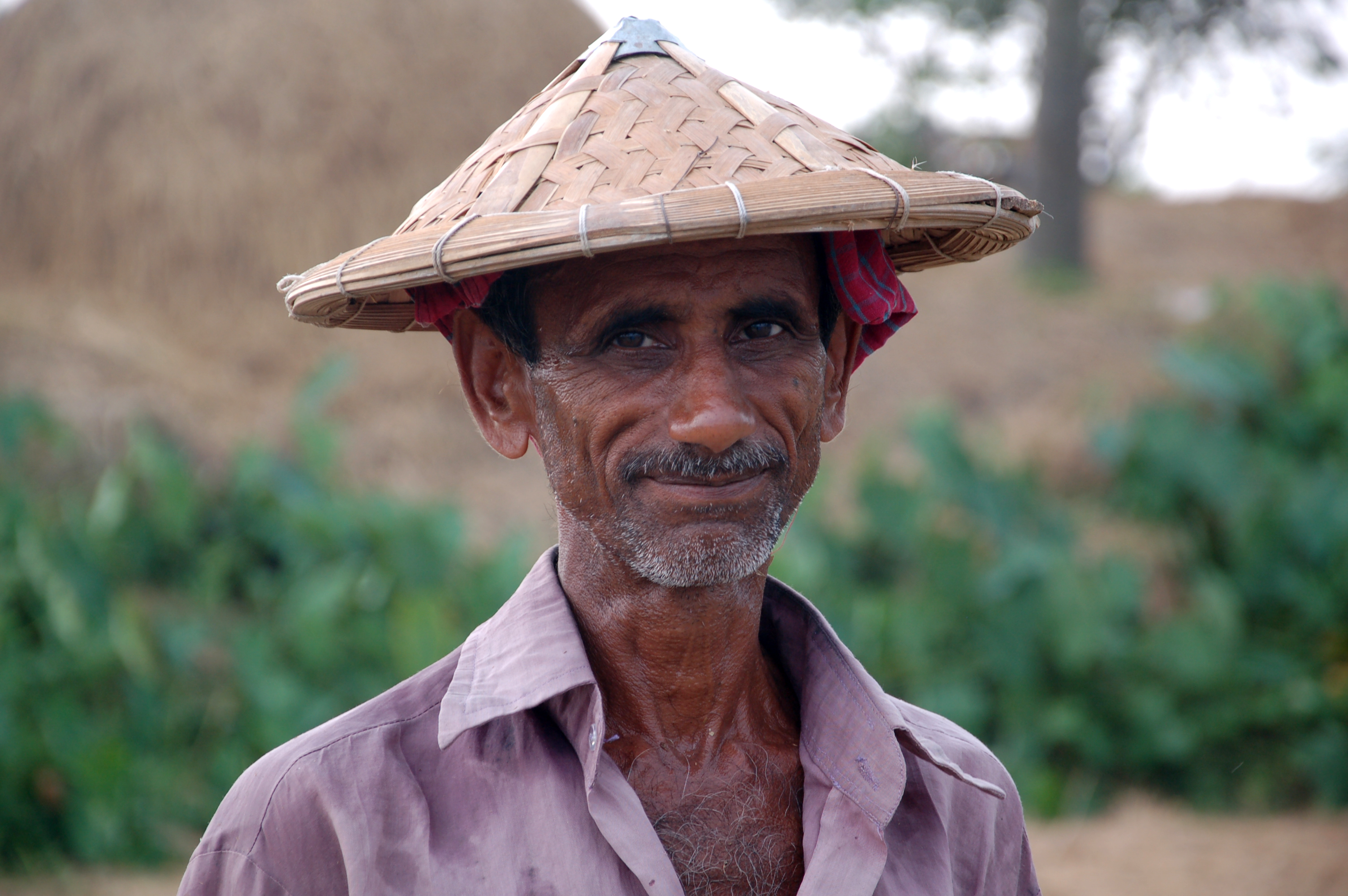
A farmer in Bangladesh wearing a mathal (মাথাল)

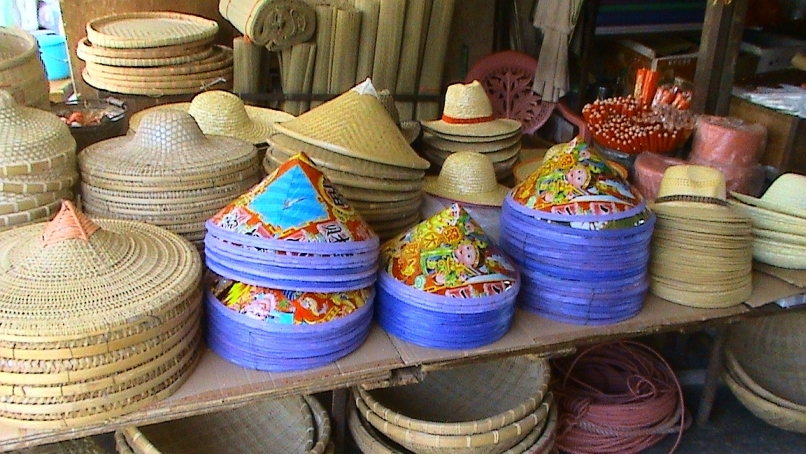
A selection of conical hats in Hainan, China

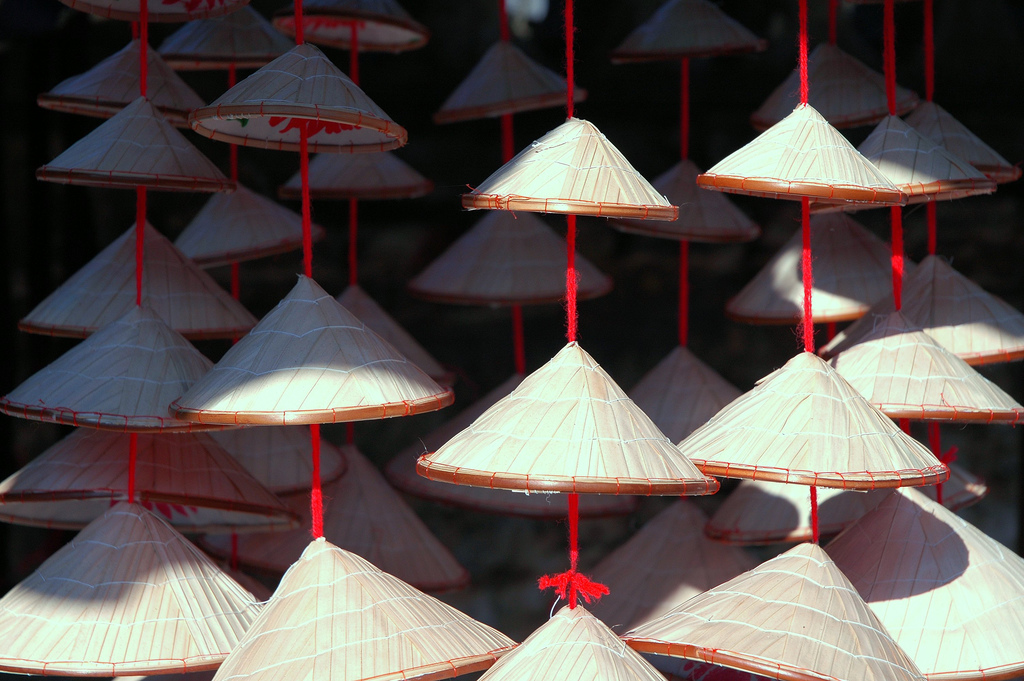
Souvenir nón tơi for tourists from Vietnam

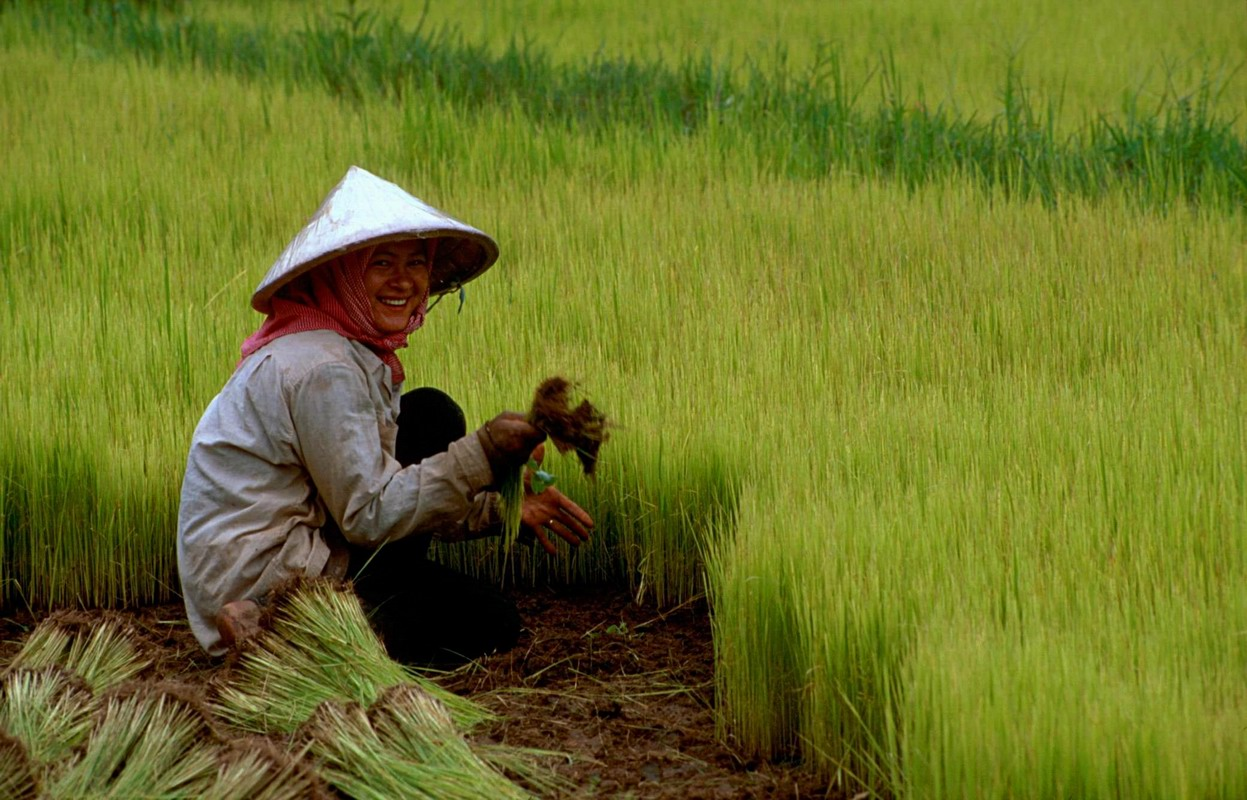
Rice farmer in northern Cambodia wearing a do'un

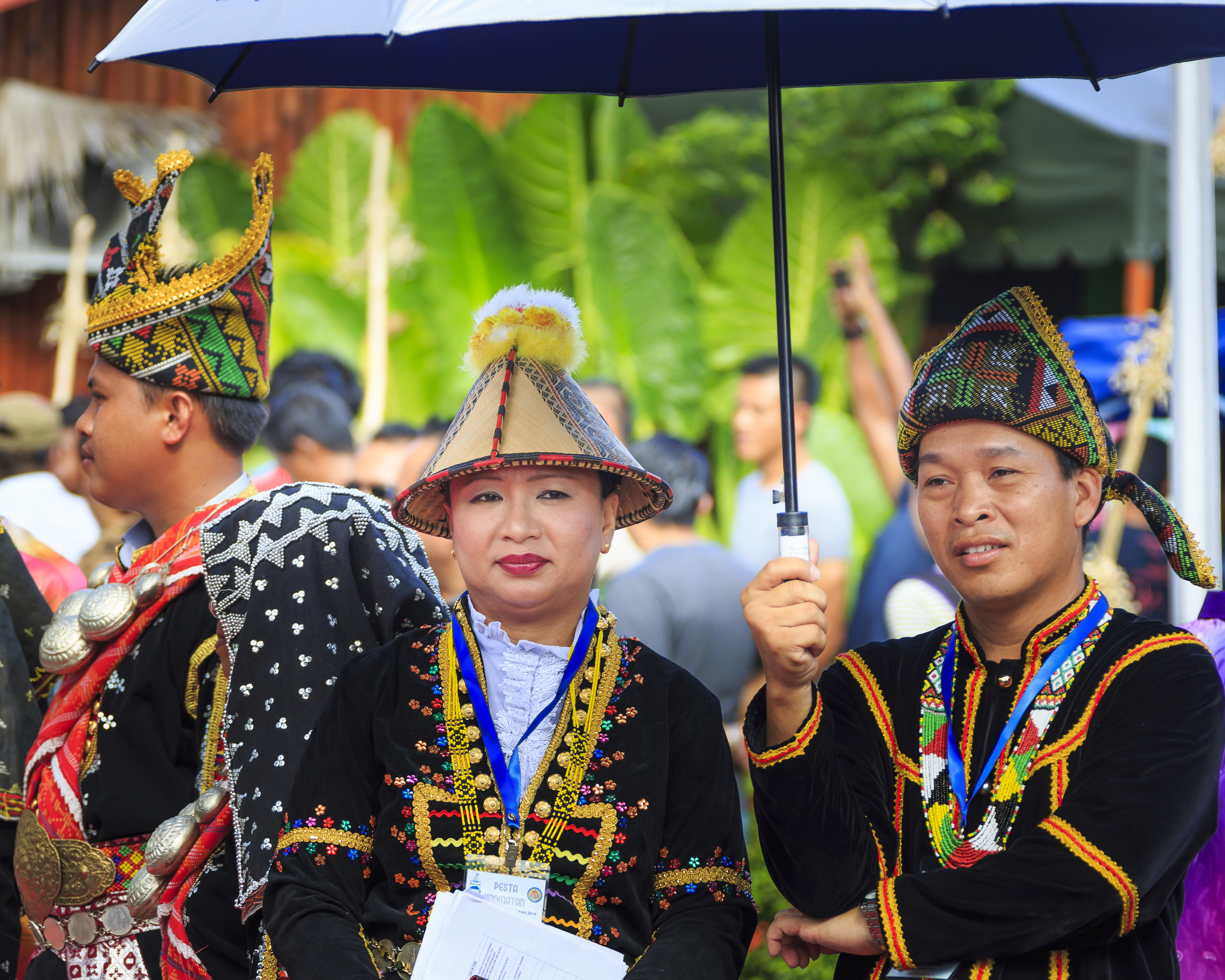
Conical hats of the Kadazan people in Sabah, Malaysia

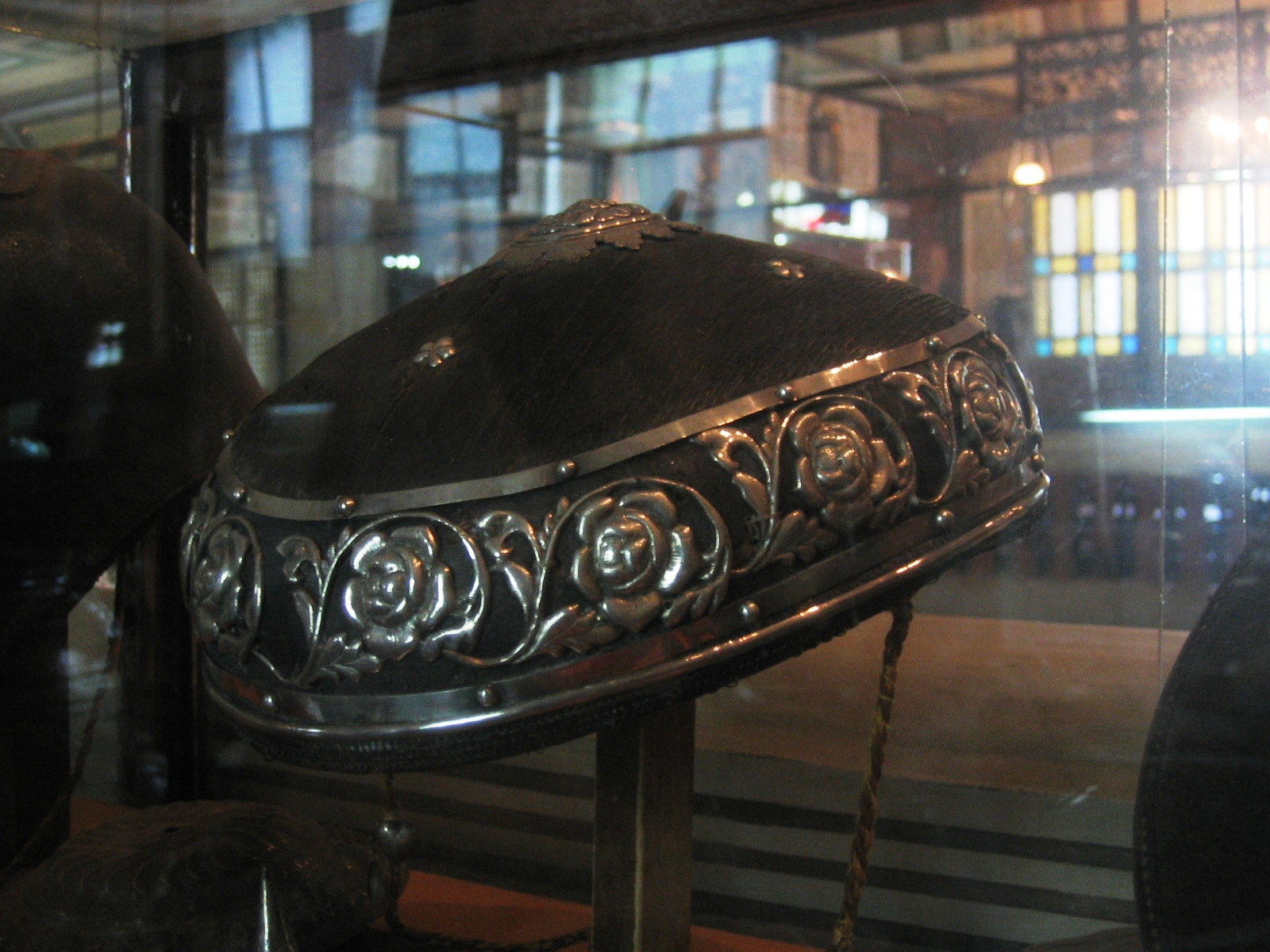
A silver inlaid Filipino salakót

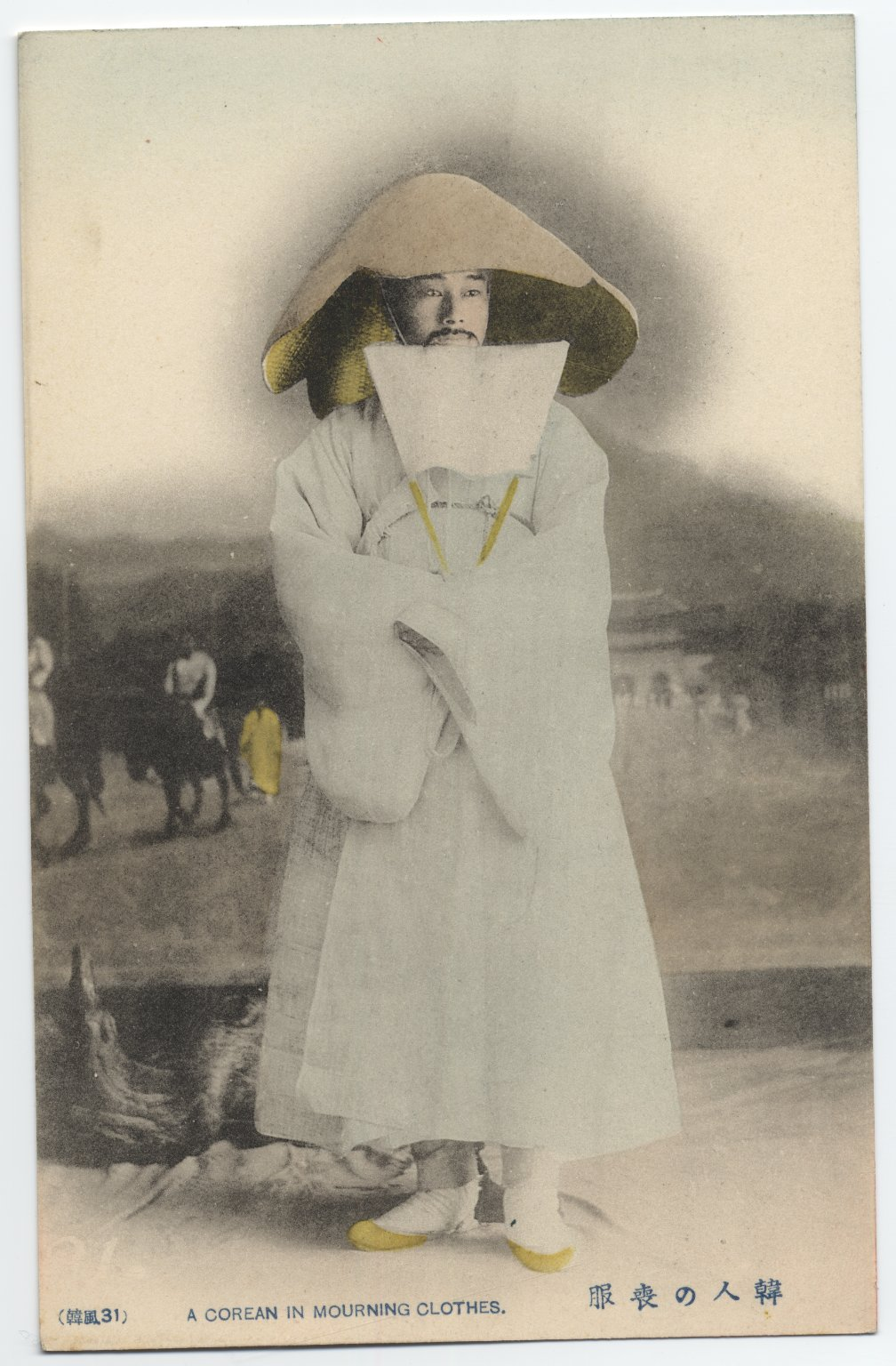
A Korean man in traditional mourning clothes and satgat

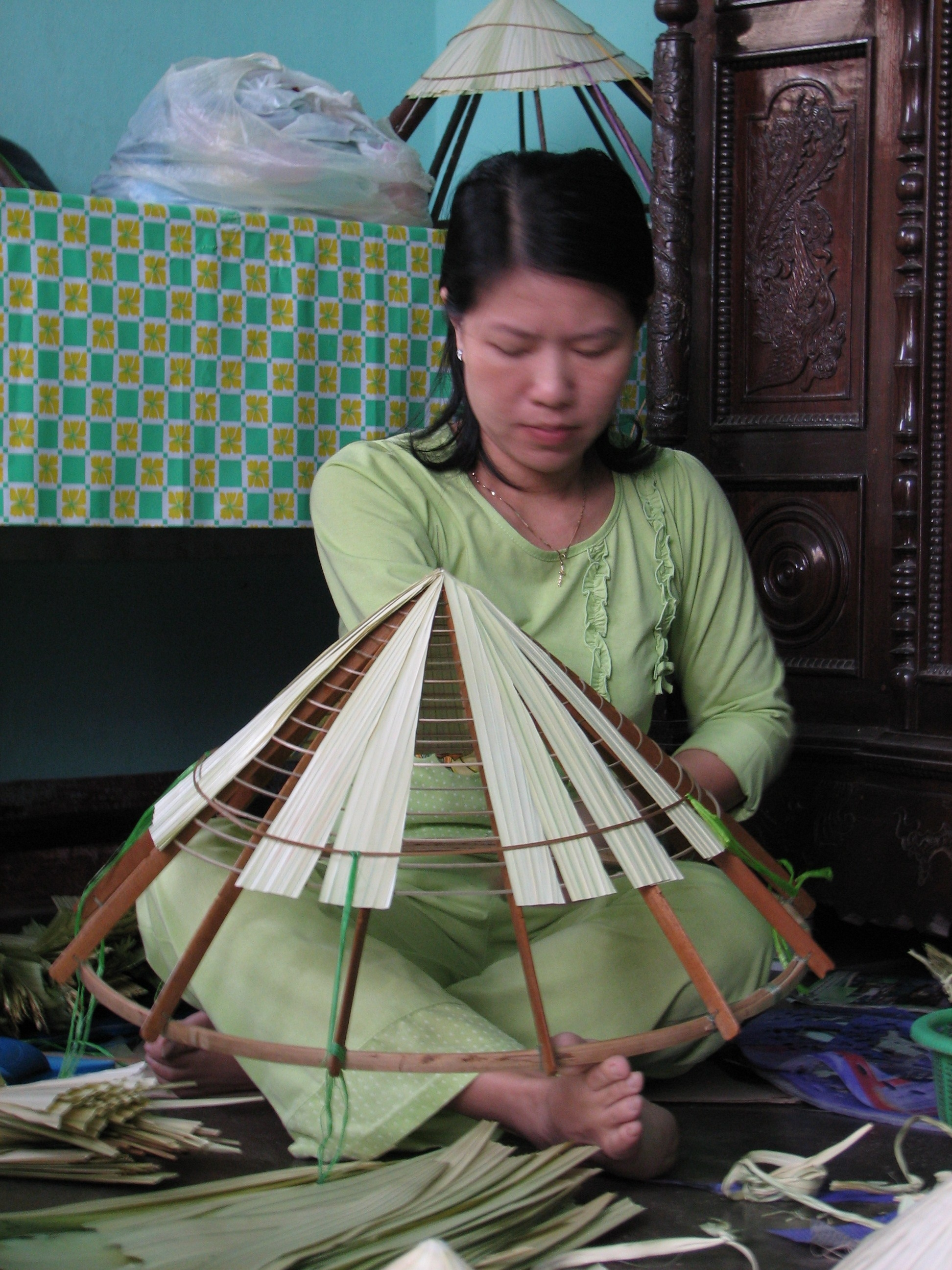
Making conical hats (nón tơi) in Huế countryside, Vietnam

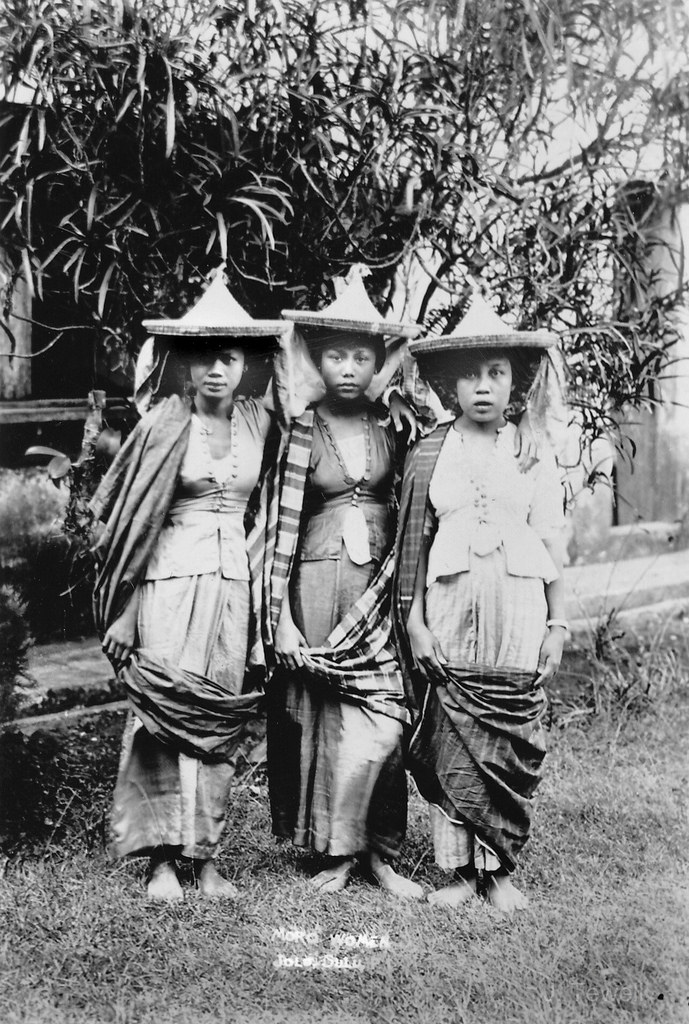
Three Sama-Bajau women wearing saruk from Jolo, Sulu, Philippines, c. 1900

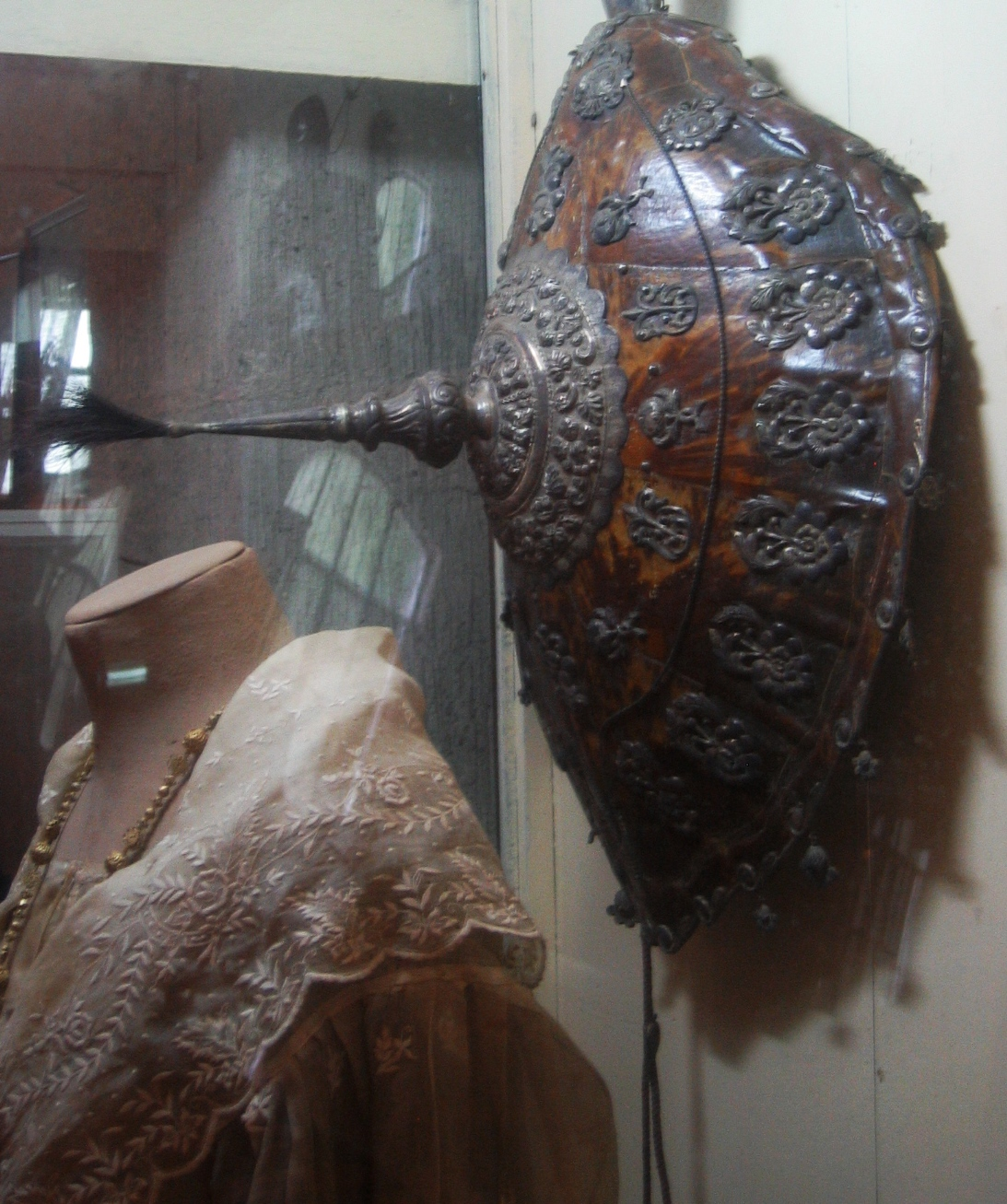
Tortoiseshell and silver salakót from the Philippines

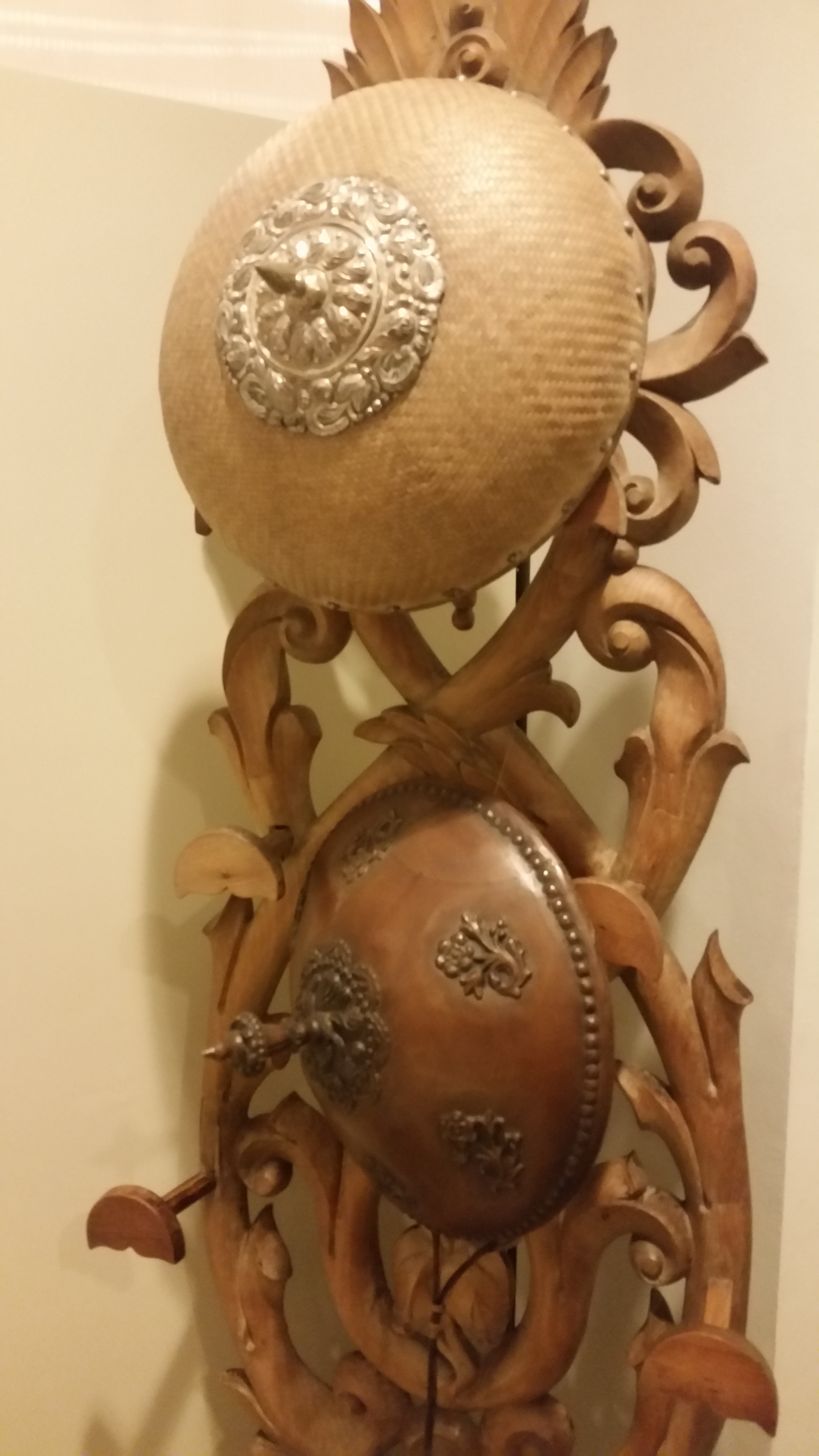
A Philippine Salakót

== See also ==
- Ba tầm, a traditional Vietnamese flat palm hat
- Fulani hat
- Gat
- List of hat styles
- List of headgear
- Mokoliʻi, an island in Hawaii with a nickname "Chinaman's Hat"
- Ngob
- Pilgrim's hat
- Pointed hat
