= Mohan Bhaira Memorial Award =

- Awarded for: Conferred on folk artistes of rural areas
- Location: Swahid Bhawan, Nalbari, Assam
- Country: India
- Presented by: Nalbari district unit of All Assam Students' Union
- Rewards: ₹10000, Seleng sadar, Jaapi and Gamosa
- First award: 2009
- Final award: 2021

Highlights
- Total awarded: 11
- First winner: Purnya Prava Dutta Tamuly
- Last winner: Harekrishna Talukdar

Mohan Bhaira Memorial Award is an award constituted by the Nalbari district unit of All Assam Students' Union and Nalbari Zila Unnati Sabha. This award ceremony held on February 1 coinciding with the death anniversary of Sangeet Natak Akademi Award-winning Bhaona artist Mohan Chandra Barman, better known as Mohan Bhaira after whom the award has been named after. It is being conferred for outstanding contribution in folk arts and specially reserved for the folk artistes of rural areas.

It was started in 2009 and Purnya Prava Dutta Tamuly was first awardee. Flautist Harekrishna Talukdar who received this award in 2021 is last awardee. This award was not declared in 2019 and 2020 due to the Citizenship Amendment Act protests and COVID-19 pandemic respectively.

The award carries a cash prize of ₹10000, a shawl (Seleng sadar), a Jaapi and a Gamosa.

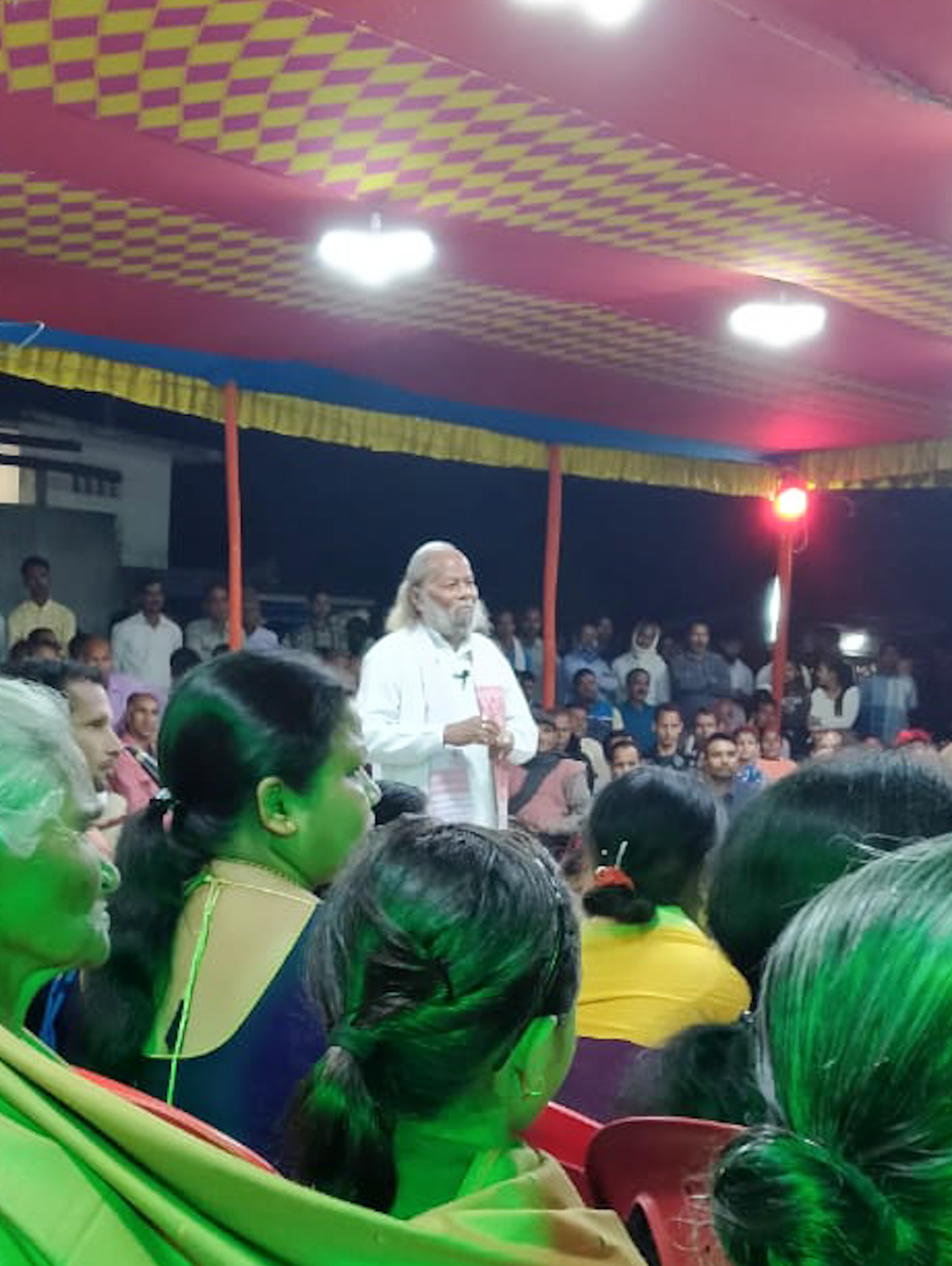
Mohan Bhaira Memorial Award (2017) awardee Nagara Naam artist Ramcharan Bharali

== Recipients ==
Serial No.	Name	Year
1	Purnya Prava Dutta Tamuly	2009
2	Sitaram Ray	2010
3	Muktaram Baruah Ojah	2011
4	Manik Saikia Ojah	2012
5	Ruhin Rabha	2013
6	Dwijen Gogoi	2014
7	Prabhat Sarma	2015
8	Hari Barbayan	2016
9	Ramcharan Bharali	2017
10	Loknath Kutum	2018
11	Harekrishna Talukdar	2021
