= Siung =

Traditional hat of Kadazan female in Sabah, Malaysia

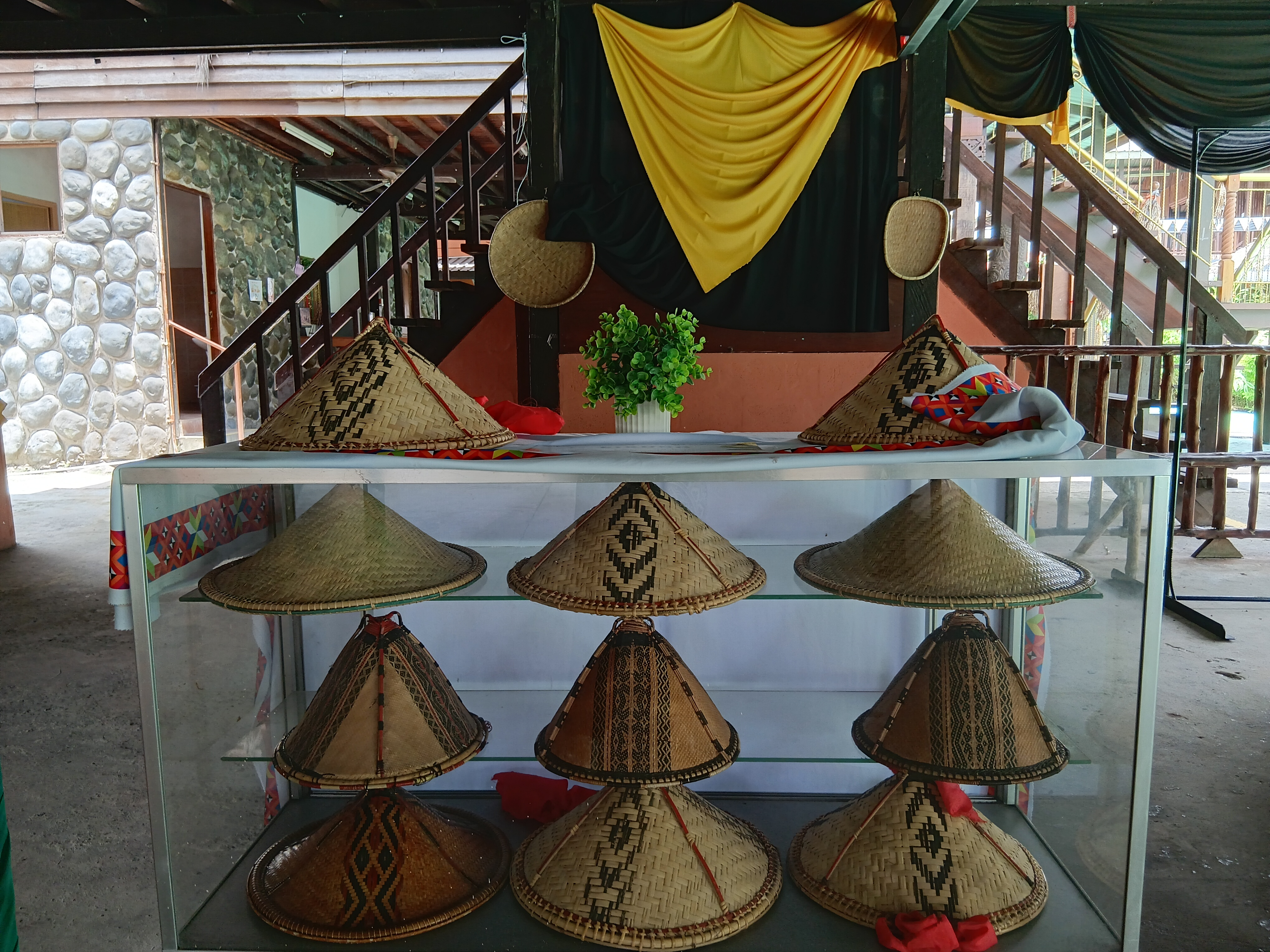
- Papar siung, in the second row from bottom at the KDCA Compound
- Type: Asian conical hat
- Material: Finely woven bamboo strips and rattan
- Place of origin: Papar District, West Coast Division, Sabah
- Manufacturer: Kadazan people

Siung or Siyung (Kadazan Dusun: Siung do Papar) is a traditional lightweight headgear from Sabah, Malaysia, once commonly worn by the Kadazan females of the Papar District for protection against sunlight and rain during their agricultural activities. In present days, the siung are more seen during the sazau or sumazau cultural performances and the harvest festival of the Kaamatan.

== Features ==
The siung is considered as the symbol of Papar Kadazans female that distinguished them from the Penampang Kadazans. It is made of finely woven bamboo strips and rattan with a feather symbolising that the Kadazan sumandaks/bazad-bazad are still unmarried; the flower one means already married, while plain either means widowed, a grandmother or elderly. Another hint is the silver belt (antique British trade dollar); unmarried Kadazan females usually have four, while those married wear only two. The siung is paired with black velvety fabric of sia with gold weave designs and a belt called ikat pinggang and dastar headdress with the same fabric.

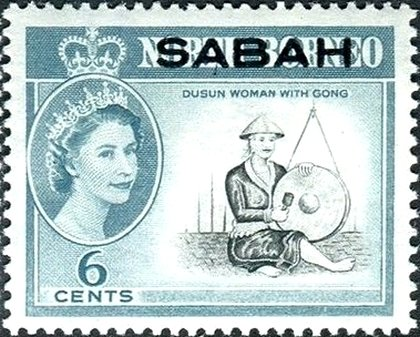
A Dusun woman (Note: The Kadazans were once categorised as part of the Dusuns group throughout British North Borneo Population Census.) (Kadazan woman) with a gong featured in a 1964 6¢ postage stamp of North Borneo (present-day Sabah) with a portrait of Queen Elizabeth II

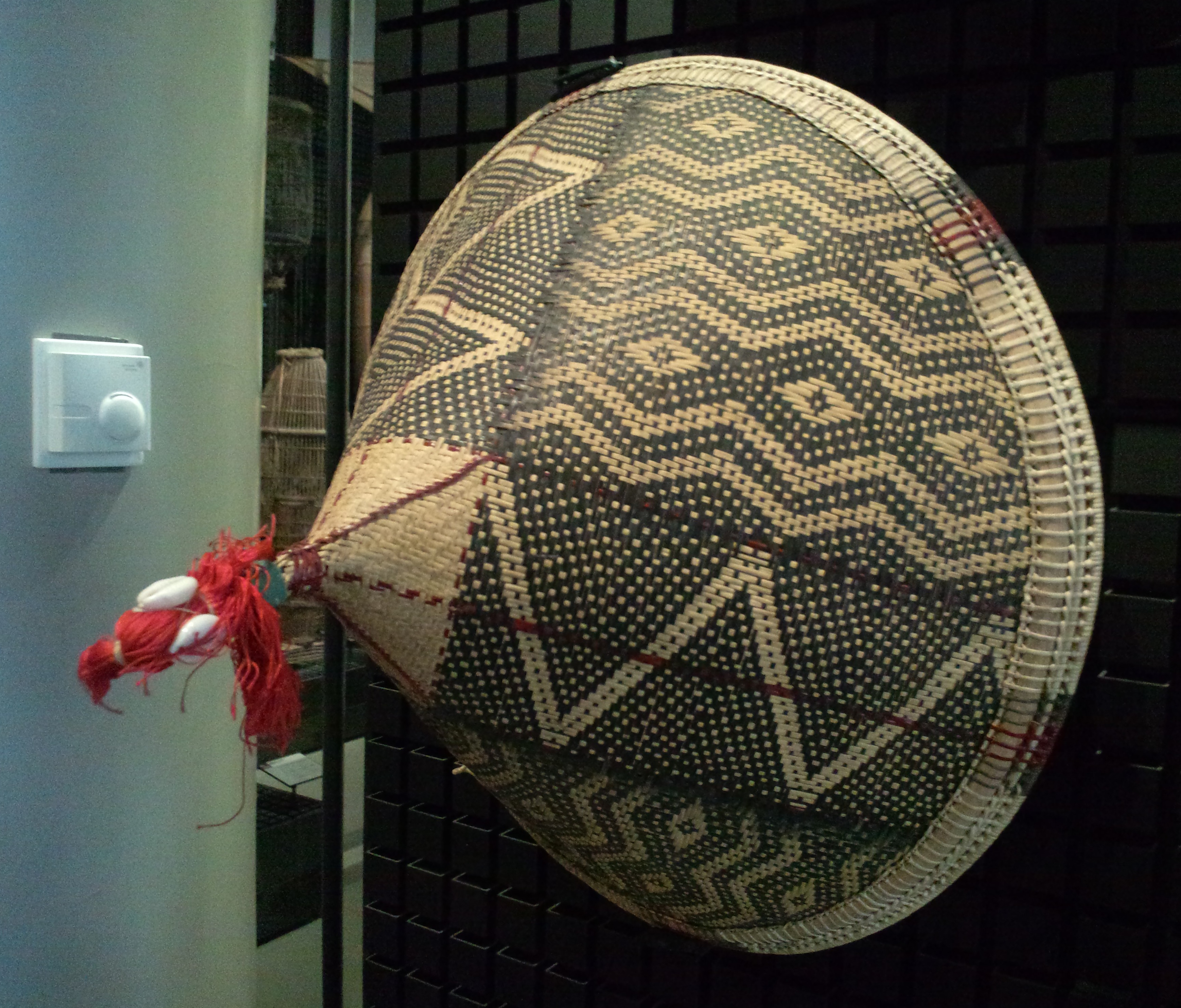
A Kadazan siung at the National Museum of Ethnology, Osaka Prefecture, Japan

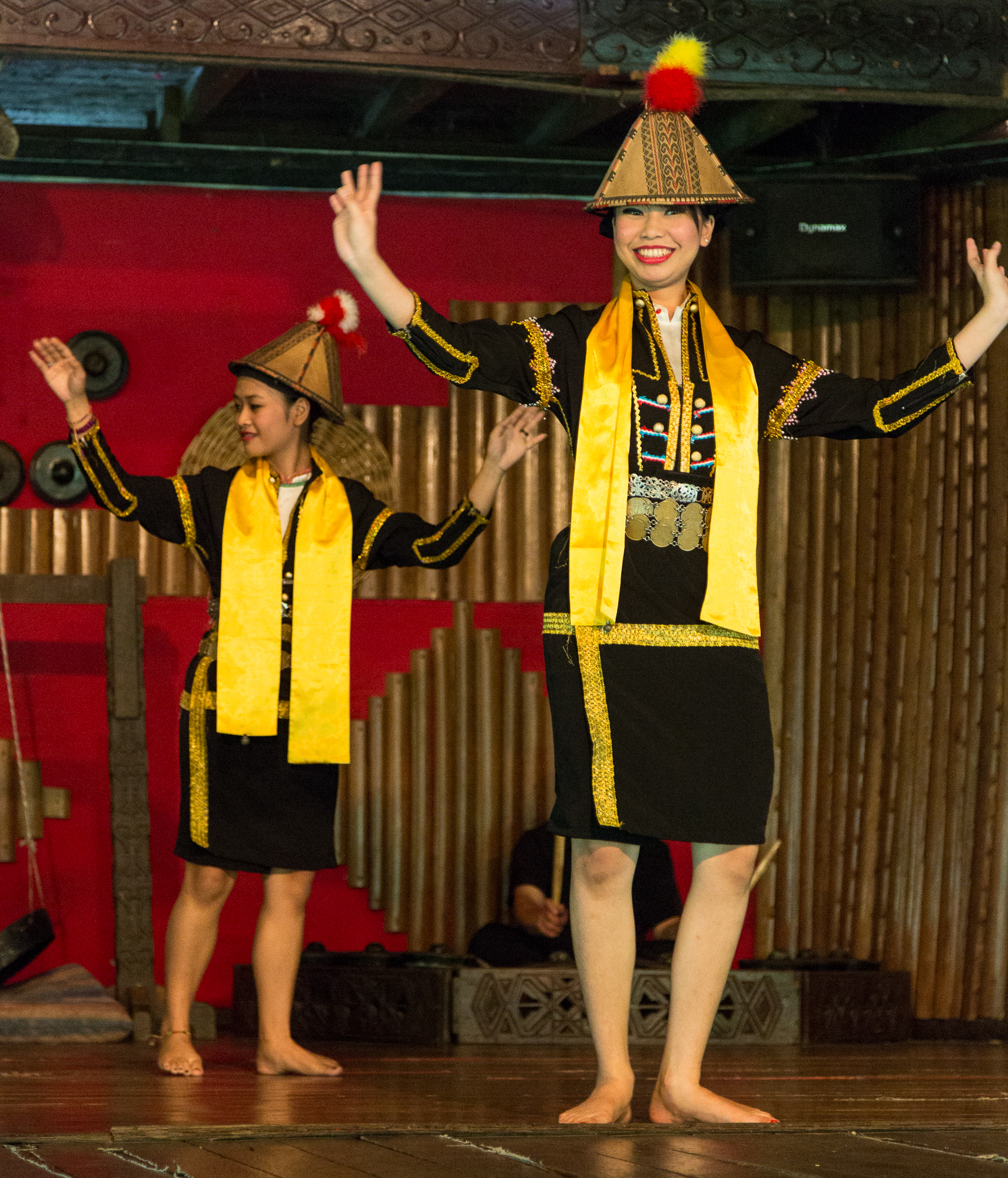
Sumazau performances by Papar Kadazans with siung at the Monsopiad Heritage Village

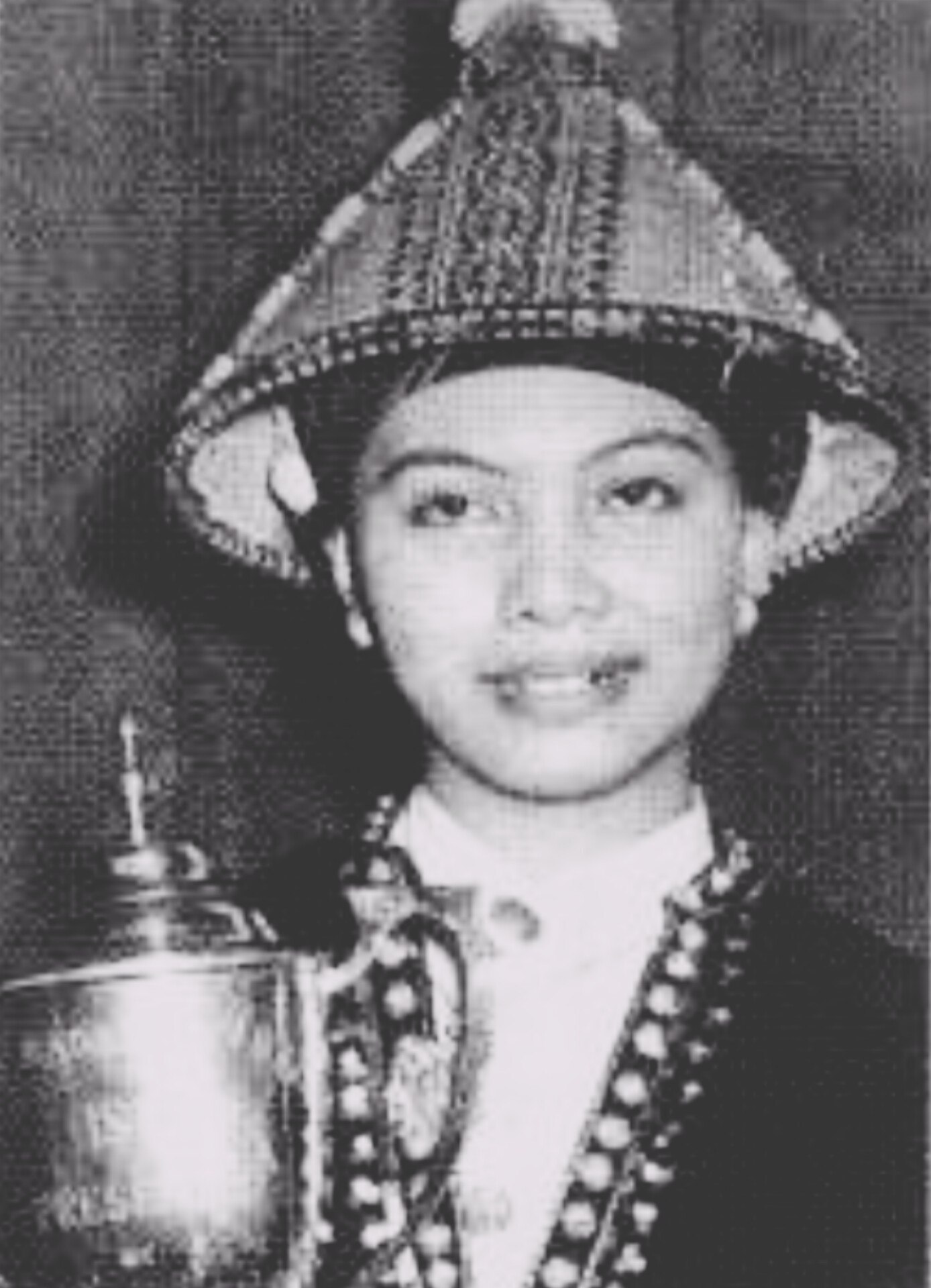
Marcella Tiansim, the 3rd season winner of Miss Kadazan in 1962. Almost every Kadazan beauty pageant participant from Papar wore the siung

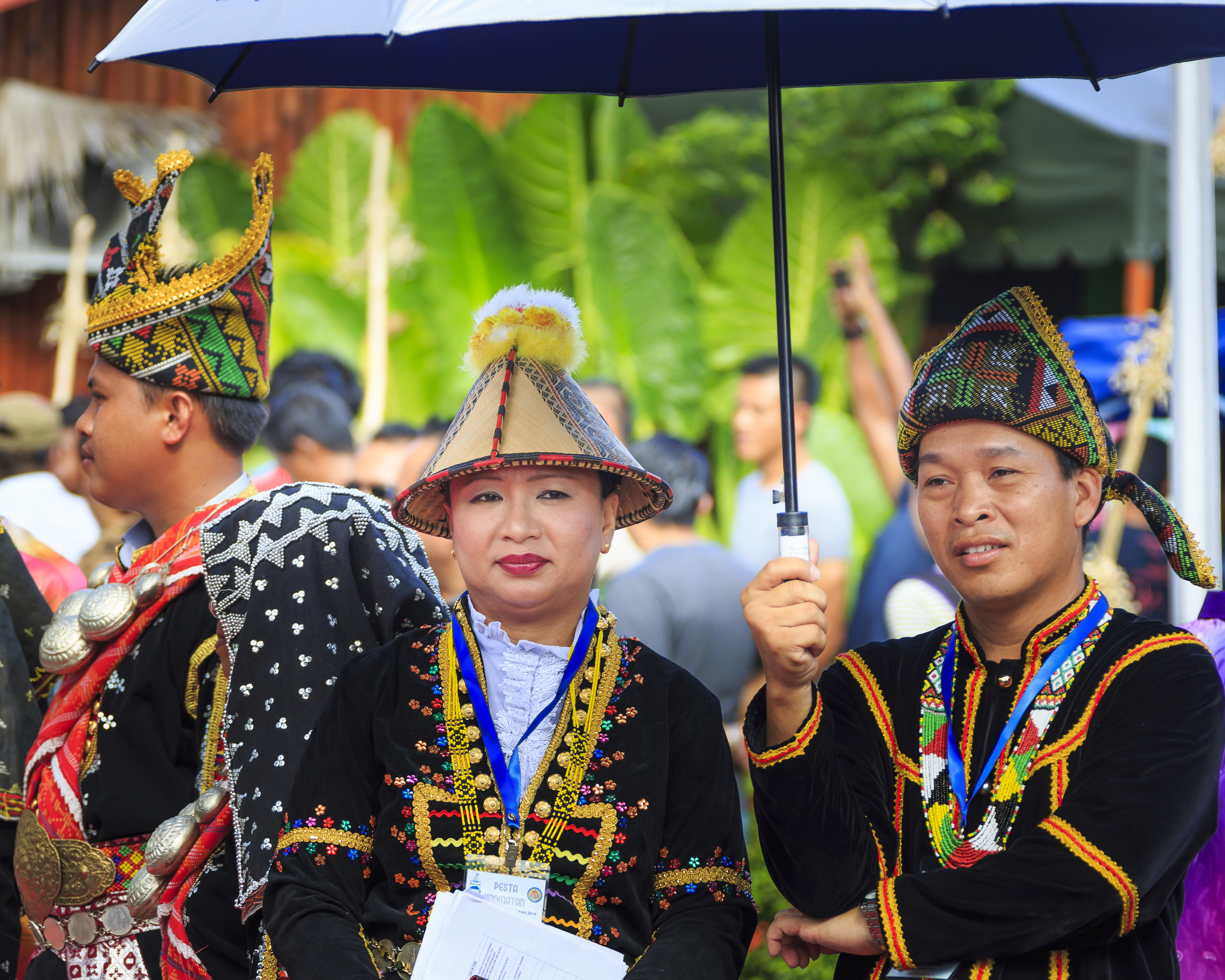
A Kadazan man and woman during the Kaamatan celebration with the woman with a siung hat

Siung once featured in the sets of Malaysian stamps of RM1 in the year of 2006.

== See also ==
- Asian conical hat
- List of hat styles
- List of Intangible Cultural Heritage elements in Malaysia
