= Jaapi =

Traditional conical hat of Assam, India

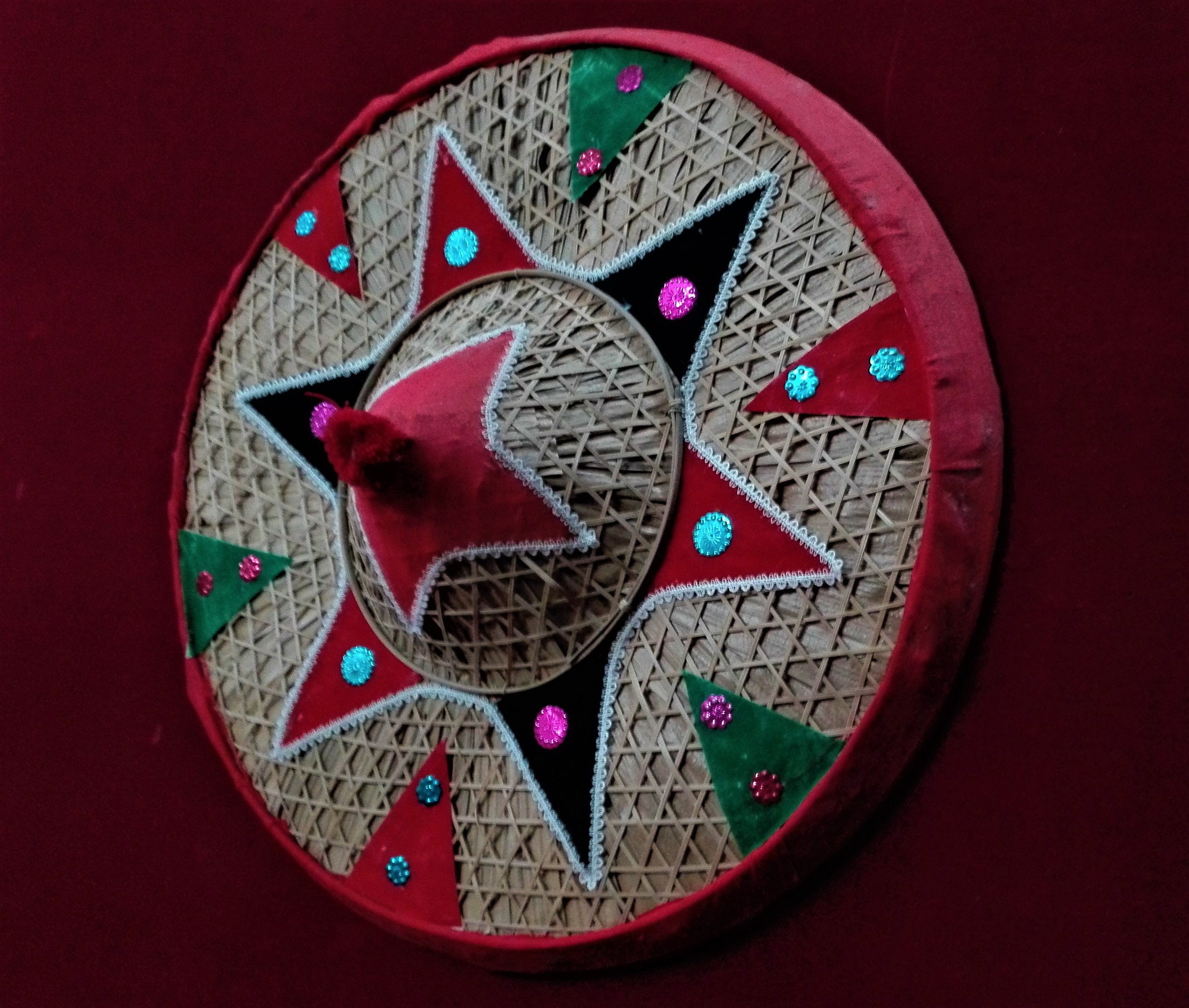
- A jaapi

Related instruments
- Nón lá (Vietnam); Do'un (Cambodia); Koup (Laos); khamauk (Myanmar); dǒulì (China)

Jaapi or Japi (Bodo: Khofri) is an Asian conical hat. It is made from tightly woven bamboo and/or cane and tokou paat (Trachycarpus martianus) a large, palm leaf. The word jaapi derives from jaap meaning a bundle of tokou leaves. In the past, plain jaapis were used by ordinary people in Assam and by farmers for protection from the sun, while ornate decorative jaapis were worn as a status symbol by the royalty and nobility. Decorative sorudoi jaapi are made with intricate cloth designs (primarily red, white, green, blue, and black) that are integrated into the weaving.

== History ==
The medieval Sutiya kings used the jaapi as a cultural symbol. The last Sutiya king gifted gold and silver embroidered Jaapis (Kup-ngiun-kham) to the Ahom king Suhungmung (1497–1539) as presents in his attempts for a treaty in the year 1523. After annexing Sadiya in 1524, the Ahom king received a lot of treasure and bounty, which included Jaapis. In the year 1525, the Ahom king gifted some of the silver Jaapis obtained from the Sutiya king and other items, to negotiate peace with the Mongkawng chief Phukloimung, a Shan state in present Kachin State of Upper Myanmar (called Nora in Buranjis) who had attacked Sadiya. During the Ahom rule, Jaapi-hajiya Khel (guild for making Jaapis) was monopolised by Sutiyas, which indicate that they were experts in weaving Jaapis. Apart from this, the Baro-Bhuyans of Central Assam are also said to have used Jaapis. As per the Satsari Buranji, the Ahom kings adopted the Tongali, Hasoti and Tokou-patia Japi from the Baro-Bhuyans.

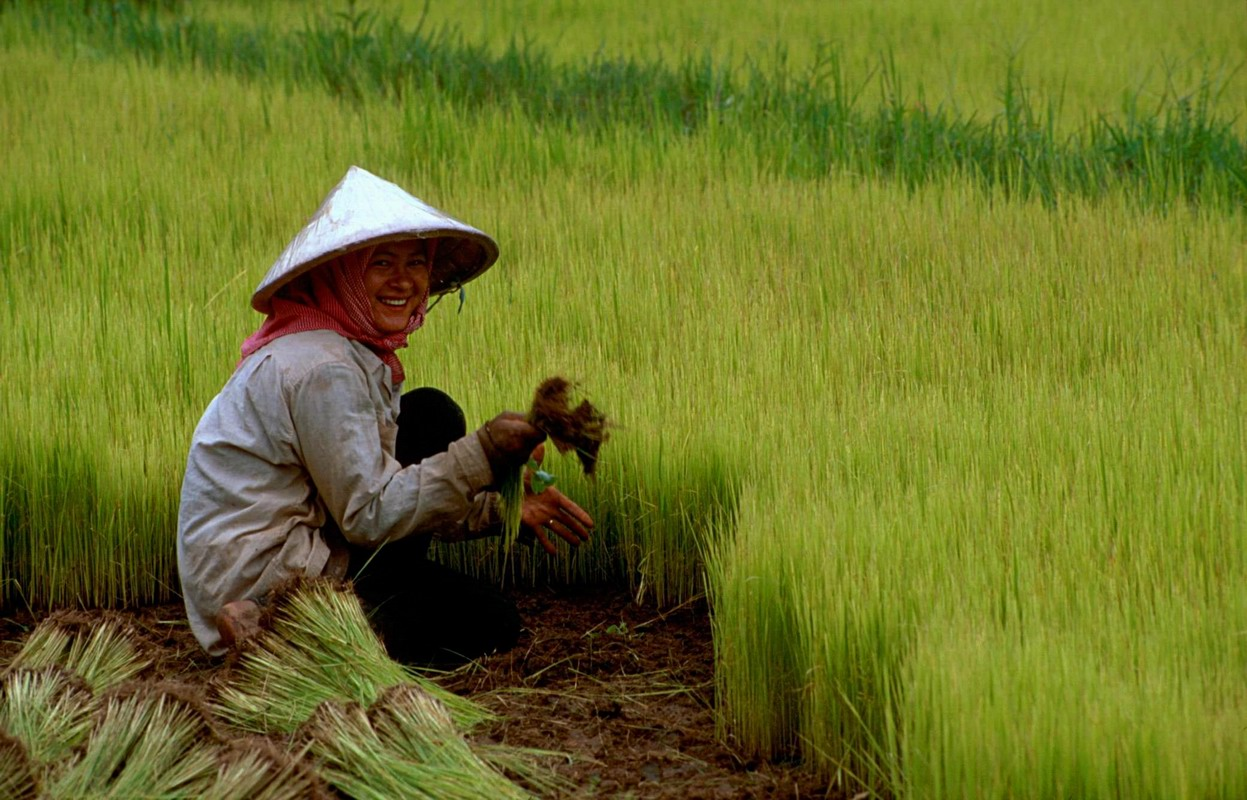
A rice farmer in northern Cambodia wearing a do'un similar to Jaapi

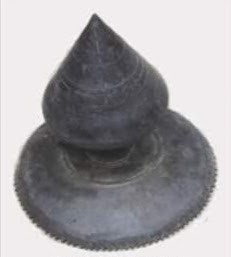
Upper metal part of an ancient Varun (Tupi) Japi known as Sula used during the rule of Sutiya kings kept in the Gharmora Satra.

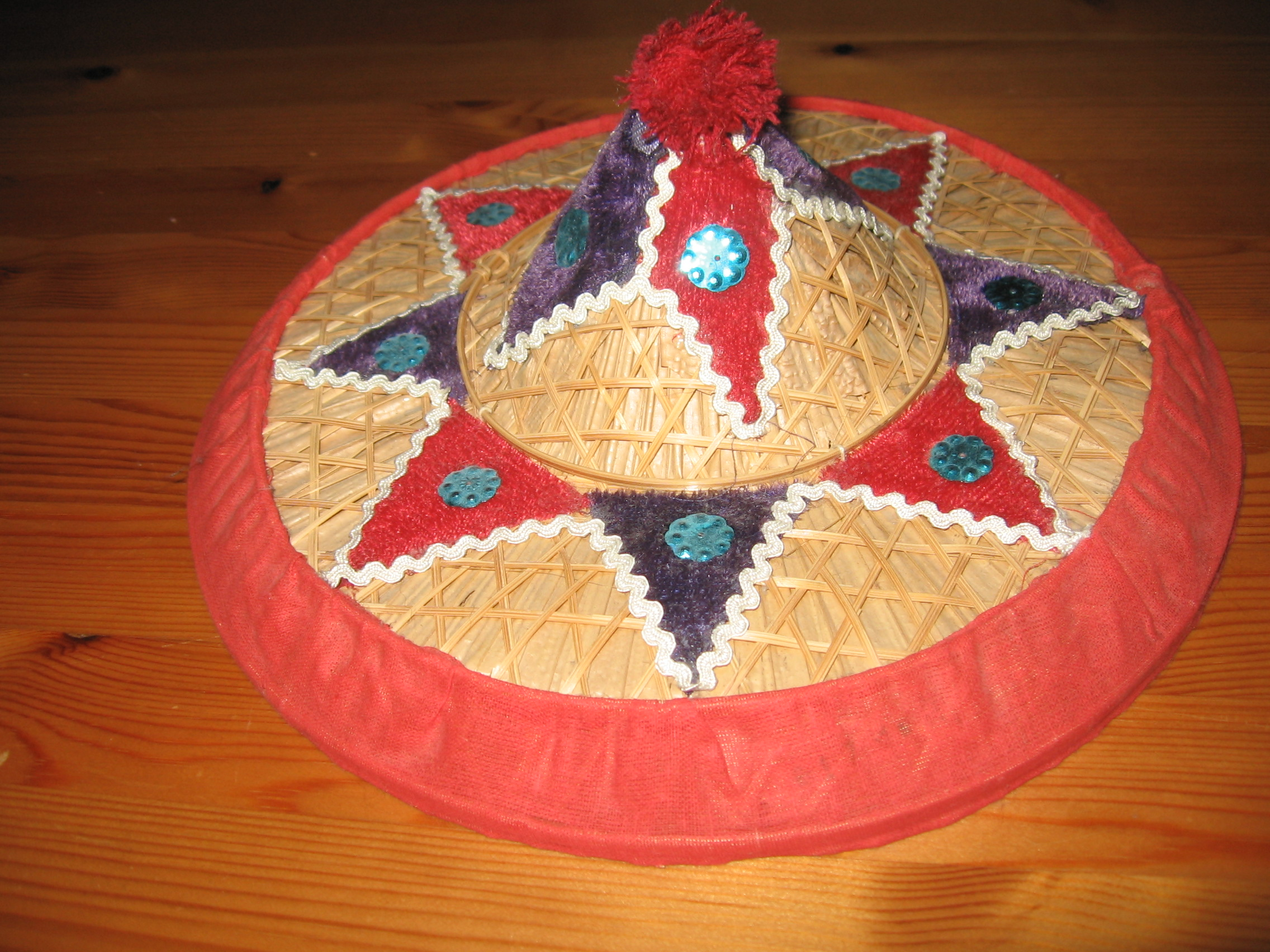
Sarudaya jaapi

An ornately made jaapi

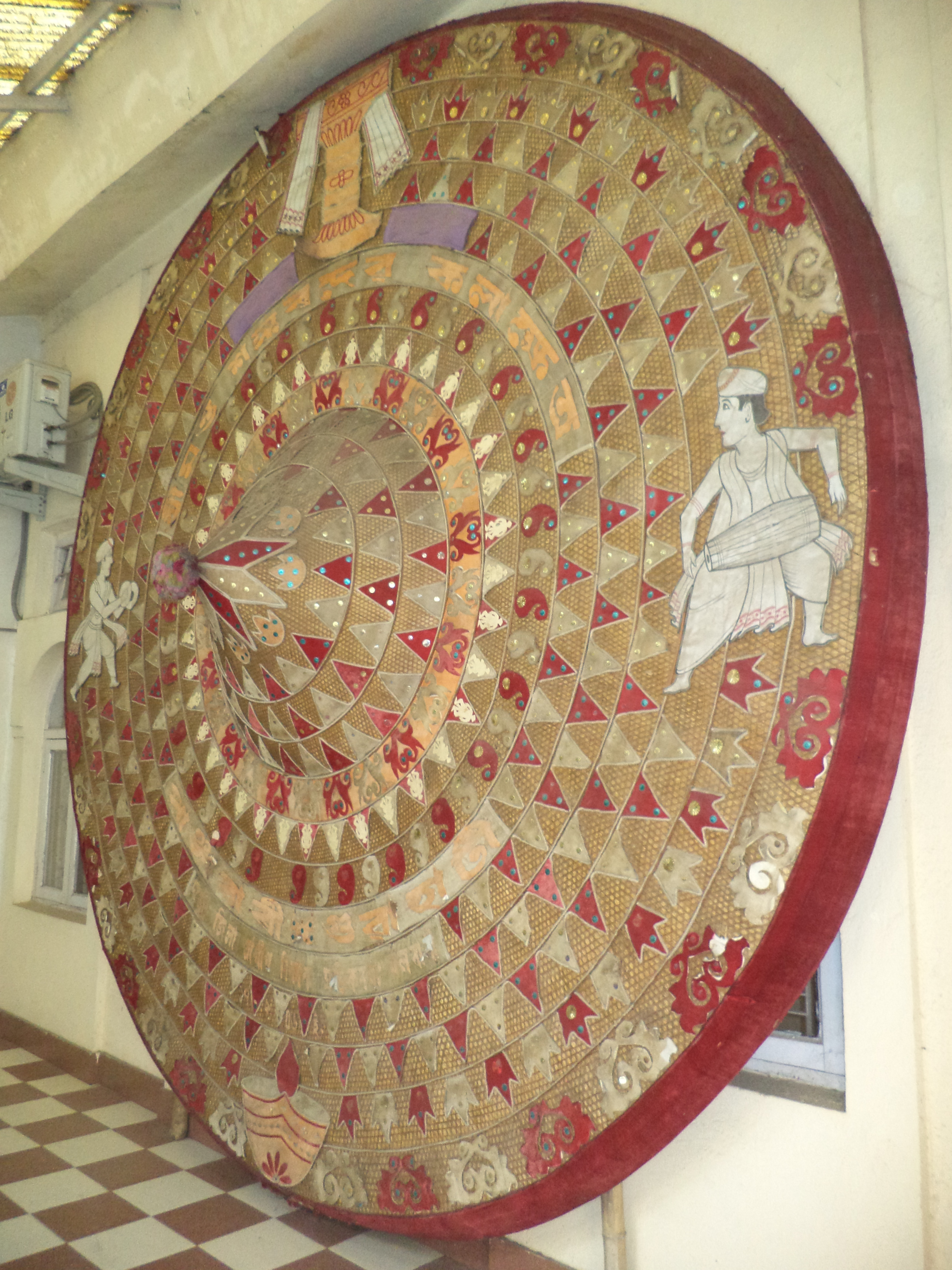
A jaapi at Kalakhetra, Guwahati

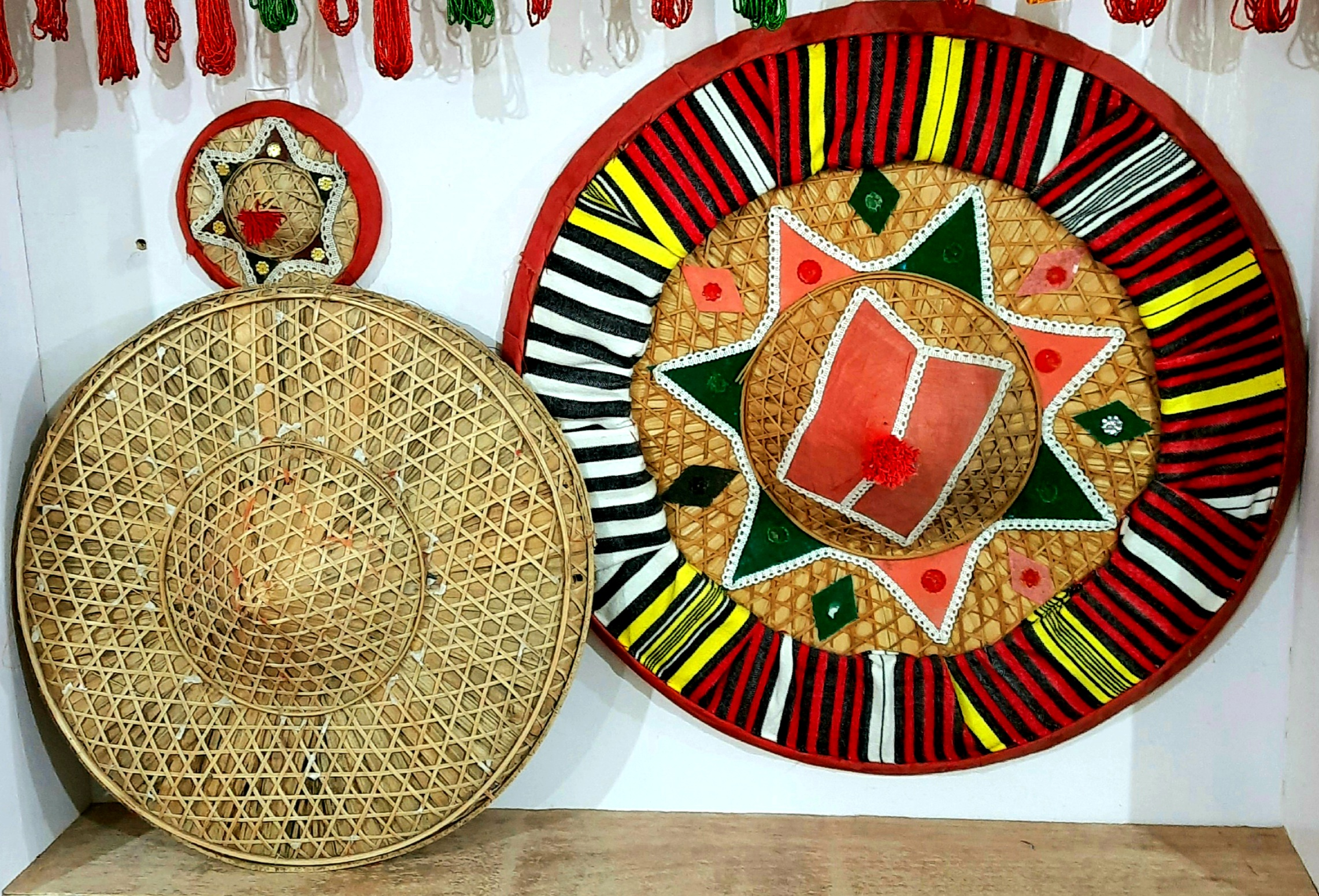
Jaapis made in Dhemaji

== Cultural symbol ==
Today the jaapi is an important symbol of Assam and its culture. It is used during Bihu dance, as protection against the elements, offered as a sign of respect in ceremonies, and placed as a decorative item around the house especially in the walls as a welcome sign.

== Types ==
- Sorudoi japi: Used by women, especially brides.
- Bordoi japi: Used by royalty since ancient times (Kamrupa).
- Panidoi/Haluwa japi: Used by farmers in fields.
- Garakhiya japi: Used by cattle herders.
- Pitha japi: Used as hoods, sometimes during cultivation.
- Tupi/Varun japi: Used in rain as protective hats.

== See also ==
- Conical Asian hat
- Culture of Assam
- List of hat styles
- List of headgear
- Textiles and dresses of Assam
