= Monsopiad Heritage Village =

Open-air museum in Sabah, Malaysia

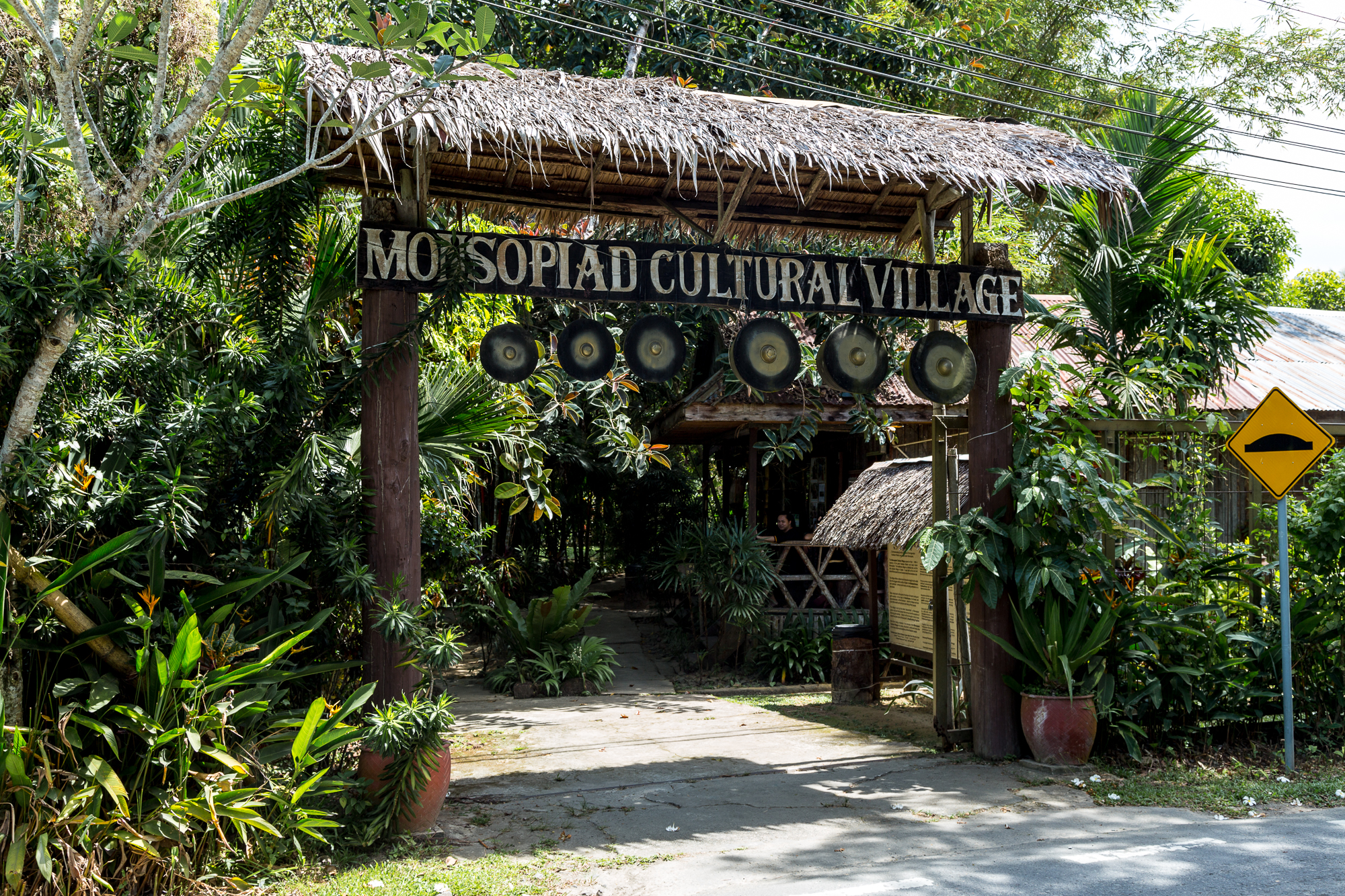
- The cultural village gate pictured in 2013, before the renaming to heritage village
- Established: 1996
- Location: Kuai Kandazon Village, Putatan Ramayah Road, 89507 Penampang District, Sabah
- Coordinates: 5°53′20.925″N 116°4′45.087″E
- Type: Open-air, cultural history, living history museum
- Website: infomonsopiadcultu.wx.com

Monsopiad Heritage Village (Kadazan Dusun: Kampung Tinungkus Monsopiad; Malay: Kampung Warisan Monsopiad) or also known by its former name of Monsopiad Cultural Village (Kadazan Dusun: Kampung Koubasanan Monsopiad; Malay: Kampung Budaya Monsopiad) is an open-air museum which is made up of several traditional buildings and a living museum in Sabah, Malaysia. Situated in Kuai Kandazon Village of Penampang District with the scenic view of Moyog River, which is about 16 kilometres (9.9 mi) from Sabah's capital city of Kota Kinabalu, the heritage village houses the legacy of Monsopiad, a fearless Kadazan-Dusun warrior of the village of Kuai who lived between 200–300 years ago.

== History and background ==
The heritage village (known as cultural village at the time) was opened to the public in 1996 to commemorate the Kadazan-Dusun warrior of Monsopiad. It is situated at the same exact spot where the warrior used to live and roam, where the village is also the first cultural village (aside from Mari Mari Cultural Village and Linangkit Cultural Village, which was established in 2008 and 2013 respectively) in Sabah. The direct descendants of Monsopiad solely established and manage the heritage village to remember their forefathers while at the same time appreciating the culture of the Kadazan-Dusuns. The establishment of the cultural village is entirely funded through private projects without any sort of financial support or grants from the government, where it also relies heavily on the support from the public to sustain it, with the entrance fee paid by the visitors going for the conservation of the heritage village, although there was an issue previously between the cultural village founders (a British businessman and his Kadazan wife, the distant descendant of Monsopiad) and the indigenous workers at the cultural village.

=== The legend of Monsopiad ===
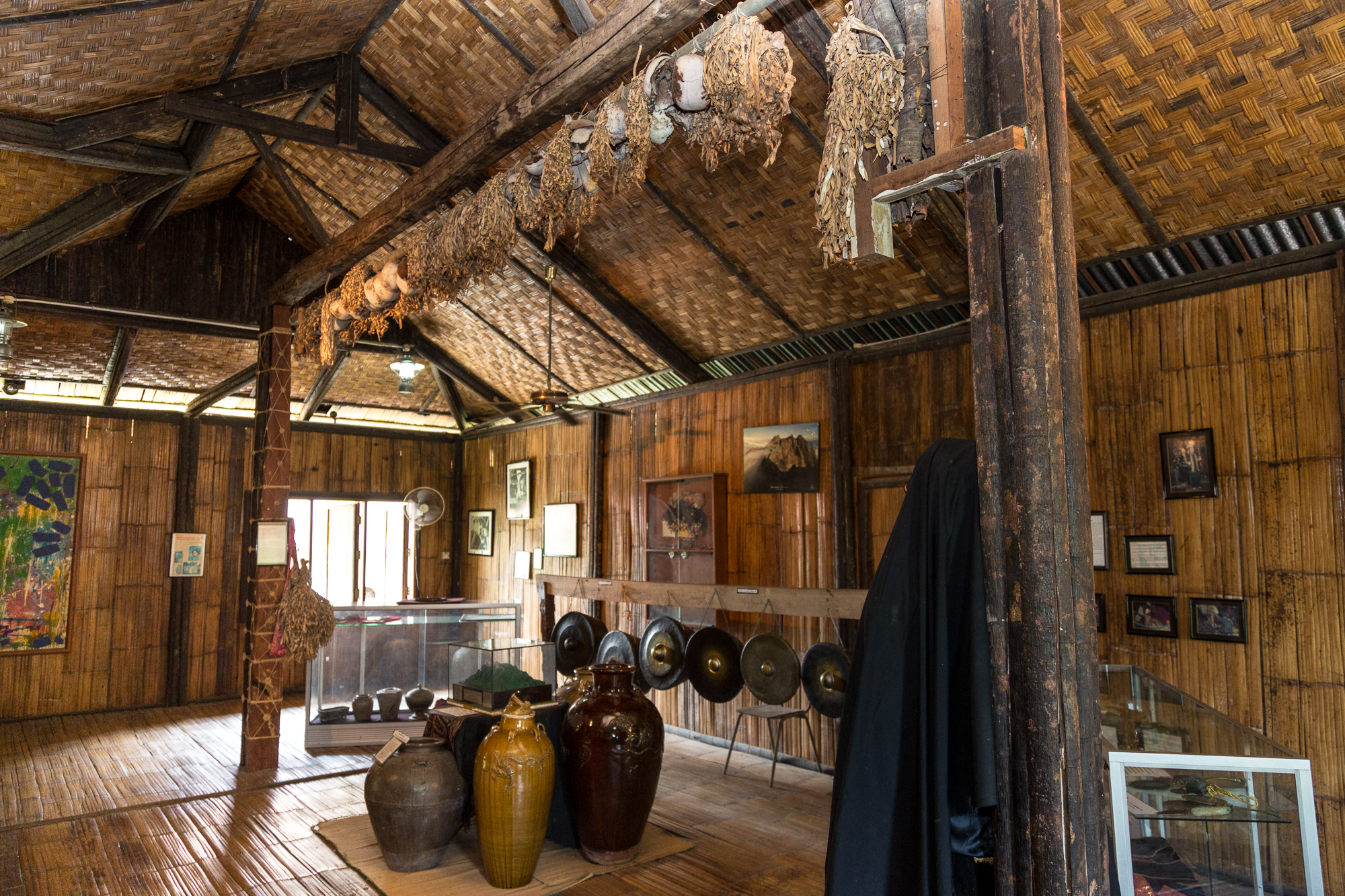
The interior view of the Monsopiad "House of Skulls", human skulls can be seen hung on display on the top

Based on a legend from centuries ago, the story starts when an indigenous lady named Kizabon was pregnant. The lady lived in a house with her husband, Dunggou. Awaiting her delivery, a sacred bird named Bugang makes its way and builds a nest on the roof of their house. When a male child was about to be born, the Bugang birds hatched as well, and the husband took the sign as a good omen, which is a sign that their newborn would have special powers or ability. The father named his son Monsopiad and at the same time took special care of the birds' well-being, such as whenever his son wanted to take a bath, Dunggou would take the young birds down from their nest to bathe together with his son. When they are done, the father will return the bird to their nest, which was done diligently until the birds were strong enough to leave the nest. The name of the village the young boy grew up in is Kuai (in present-day Penampang District), where his maternal grandfather is the headman. However, the once peaceful village was so chaotic and problematic since it was often plundered and attacked by piratical bandits composed of Iranun people and from rival tribal groups such as the Murut people, and every time the bandits came, the villagers had to retreat and hide while the bandits continued to ransack their homes and property. Monsopiad, however, was given special training since his childhood, and he turned out to be an excellent fighter and grew up to become a warrior.

When he became an adult, he vowed to hunt down and fight off the bandits that had terrorised his village for so long. Every time a fight occurs with the bandits, he will bring back their heads as trophies and hang them from the roof of his house. To further prove that he really did as promised, three boys went with him as witnesses. Just as he promised, Monsopiad's journey to rid his village of the bandits was successful by finally killing the piratical bandits leader, and upon coming home, he was given a hero's welcome. He was so honoured by the welcome that he proclaimed to destroy every single enemy that tries to disturb the peace of his village. Over the years, he grows to be very strong and attains a reputation that no one is able to challenge. However, this soon caused Monsopiad to be obsessed with his murderous rages that frequently plaguing his obsessive mind, where he simply could not stop himself from beheading more people and soon started provoking even peaceful men to fight him so that he could behead them.

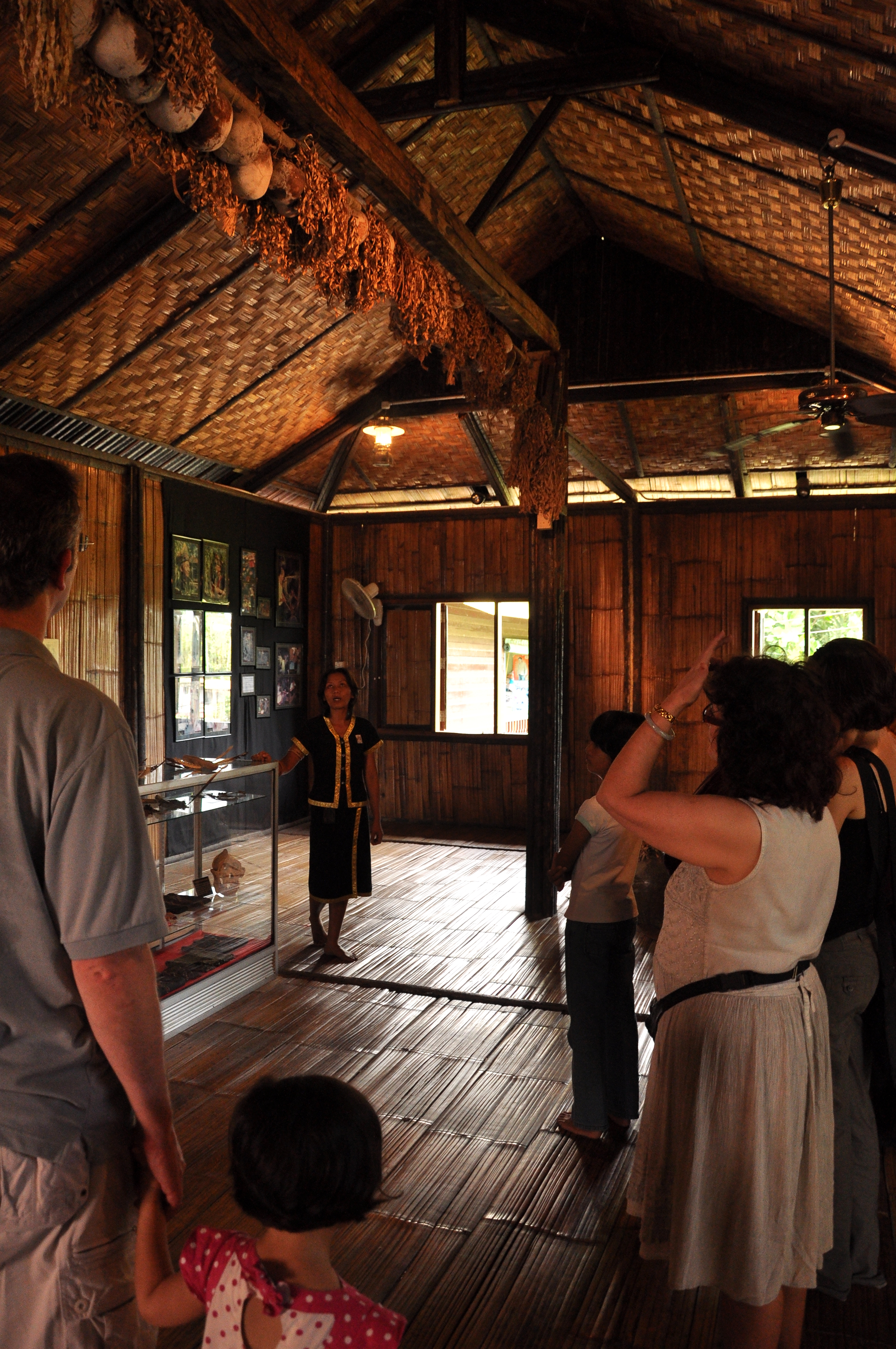
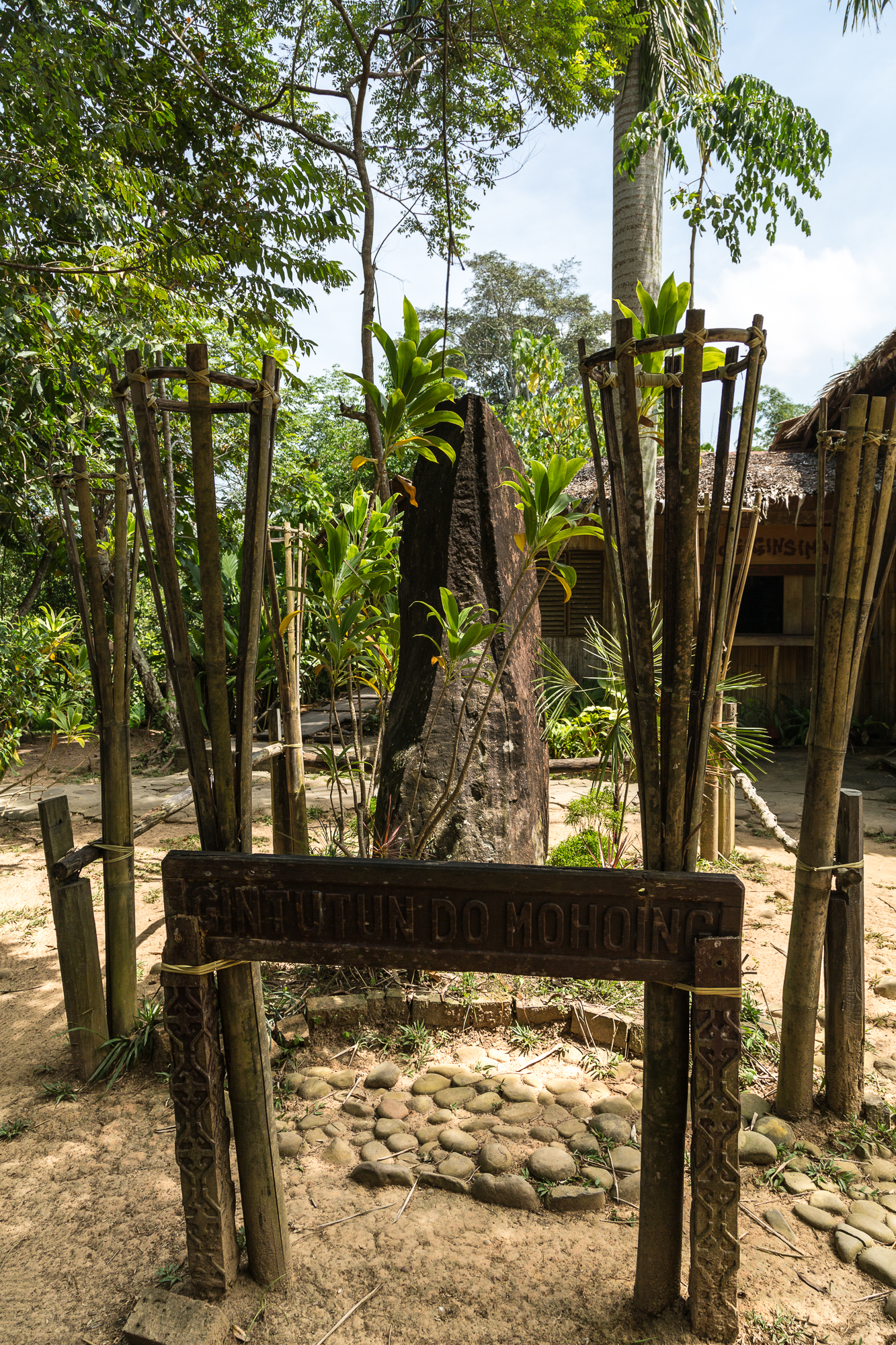
(Left) A group of tourist visiting the "House of Skulls" at the heritage village in 2008
(Right) The "Gintutun do Mohoing" monolith, surrounded by tall bamboo pole

His behaviour had changed; all the villagers and his close friends became terrified of him. With little choice, the villagers started to gather a group of brave men together, and they planned to eliminate Monsopiad due to his constant threats. As much as they respected Monsopiad for his heroic deeds, they had no other choice other than to kill him, since he had slowly turned into a very dangerous threat. One night, as planned, the men moved in for the kill as Monsopiad was resting in his house. As they jointly attacked him, he fought back fiercely but realised that he had lost his special powers that were bestowed upon him by the Bugang bird. He was killed afterwards. Despite his downfall, the villagers still loved Monsopiad deeply for all the good deeds he had ever done for the villagers safety. After all, he able to kill a total of 42 enemies throughout his life.

== Features ==
The exhibits at the heritage village museum include the "House of Skulls" which houses skull dating back from the headhunting era where all the 42 "trophies" of Monsopiad's are hung on display. The menhir which are believed to be the tombstone of Monsopiad has a height of 96 cm (3 ft 2 in), width of 49 centimetres (1.61 ft) at its base, a breadth of about 6 centimetres (0.20 ft) to 7 centimetres (0.23 ft), and a circumference at mid-level of 1.1 metres (3.6 ft). Another sight is a large stone monolith named "Gintutun do Mohoing", which is believed to be inhabited by spirits from the past. At the centre of the village is the tangkob (granary) where the essence of Kadazan-Dusuns life is stored in the form of paddy. As visitors traverse throughout the village, the "Kotos di Monsopiad" also can be seen at the site which is dedicated on the life journey of Monsopiad and his descendants. Variety of artefacts, from ceramic jars to paddy grinders, reminiscing the visual journey into the past with one of the feature is the costume of "Bobohizan Inai Bianti", a direct descendant of Monsopiad and a revered high priestess.

== Gallery ==
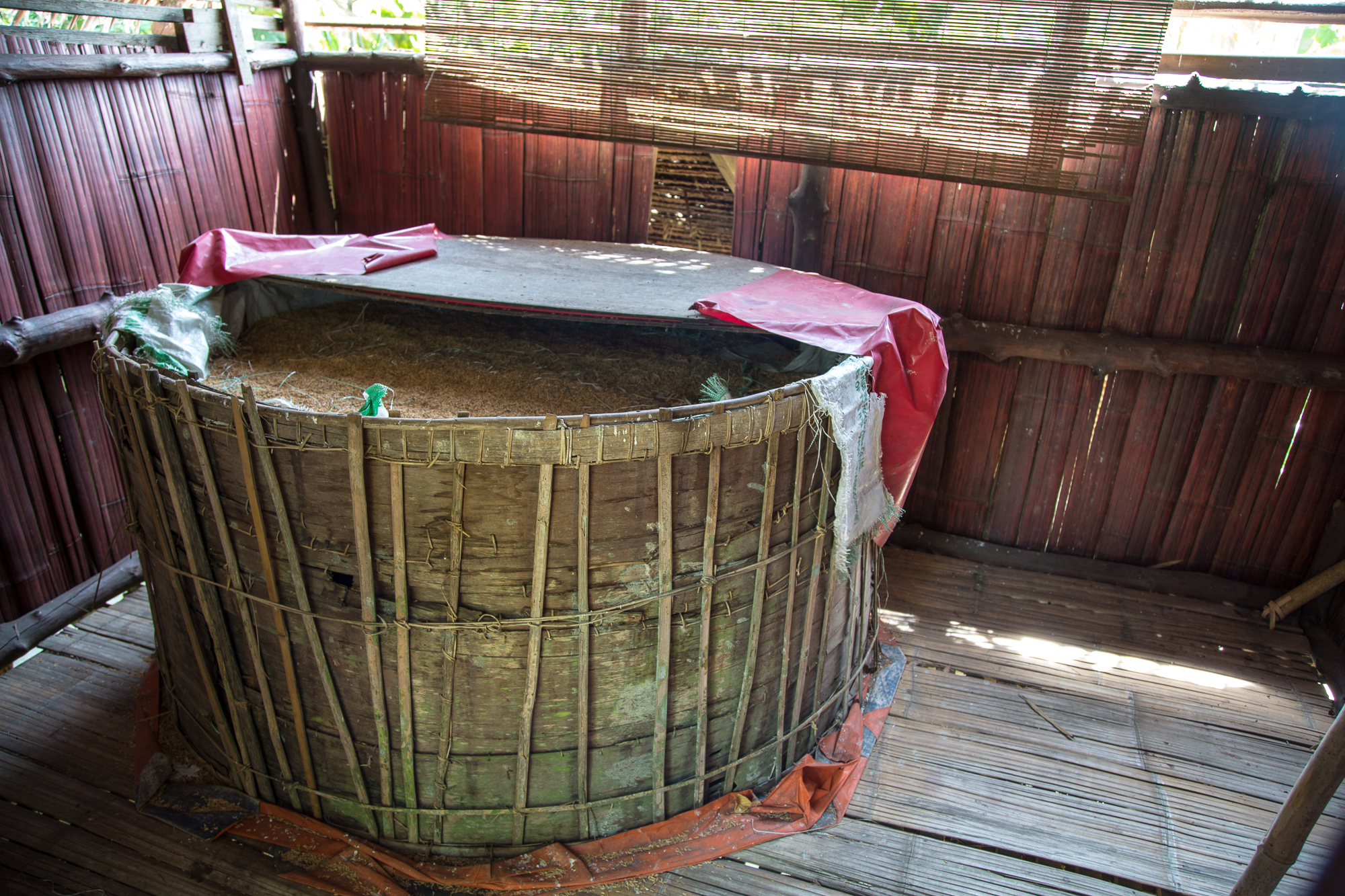
Paddy storage at the heritage village

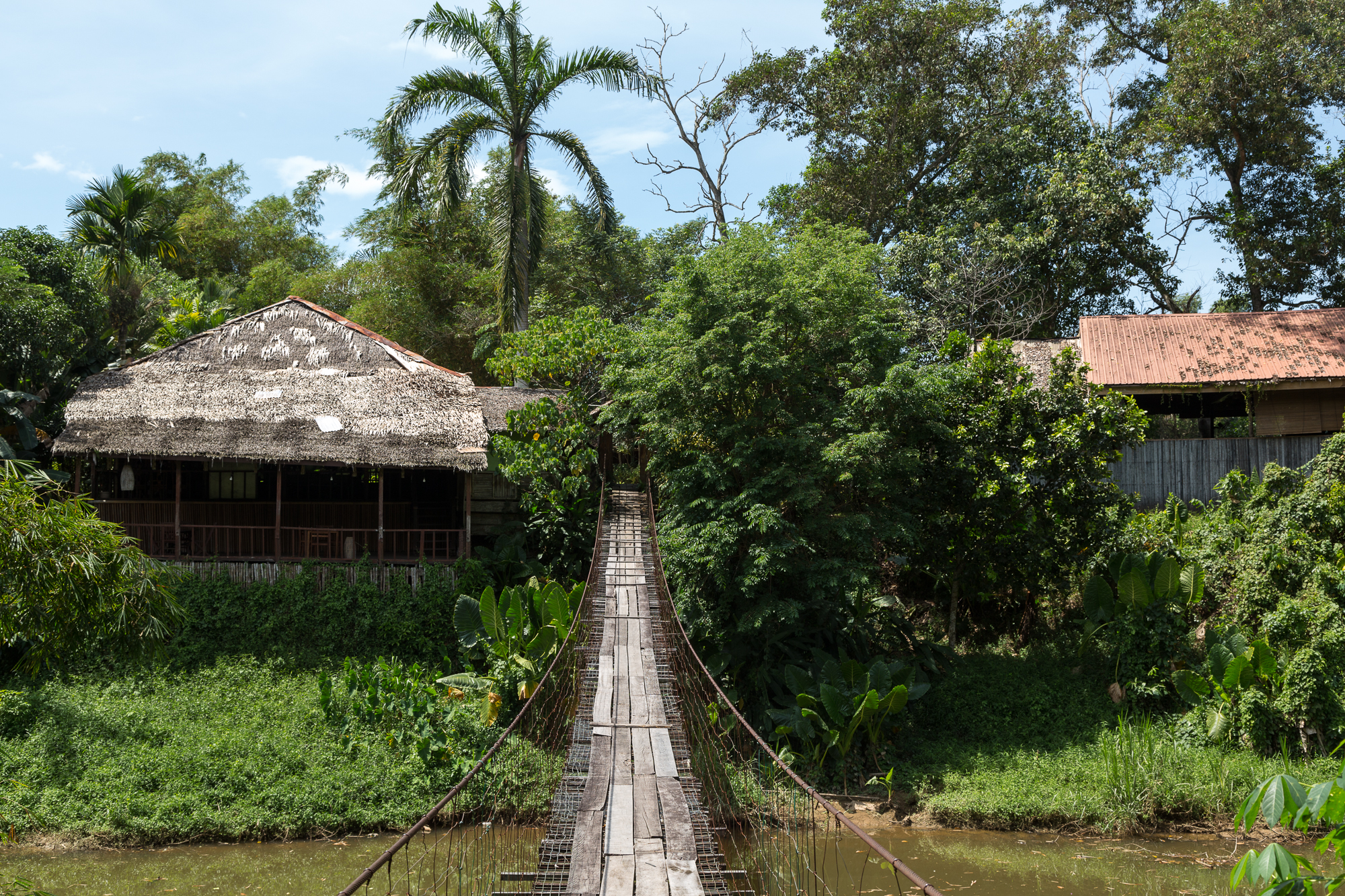
Wood suspension bridge passing through the Moyog River behind the heritage village

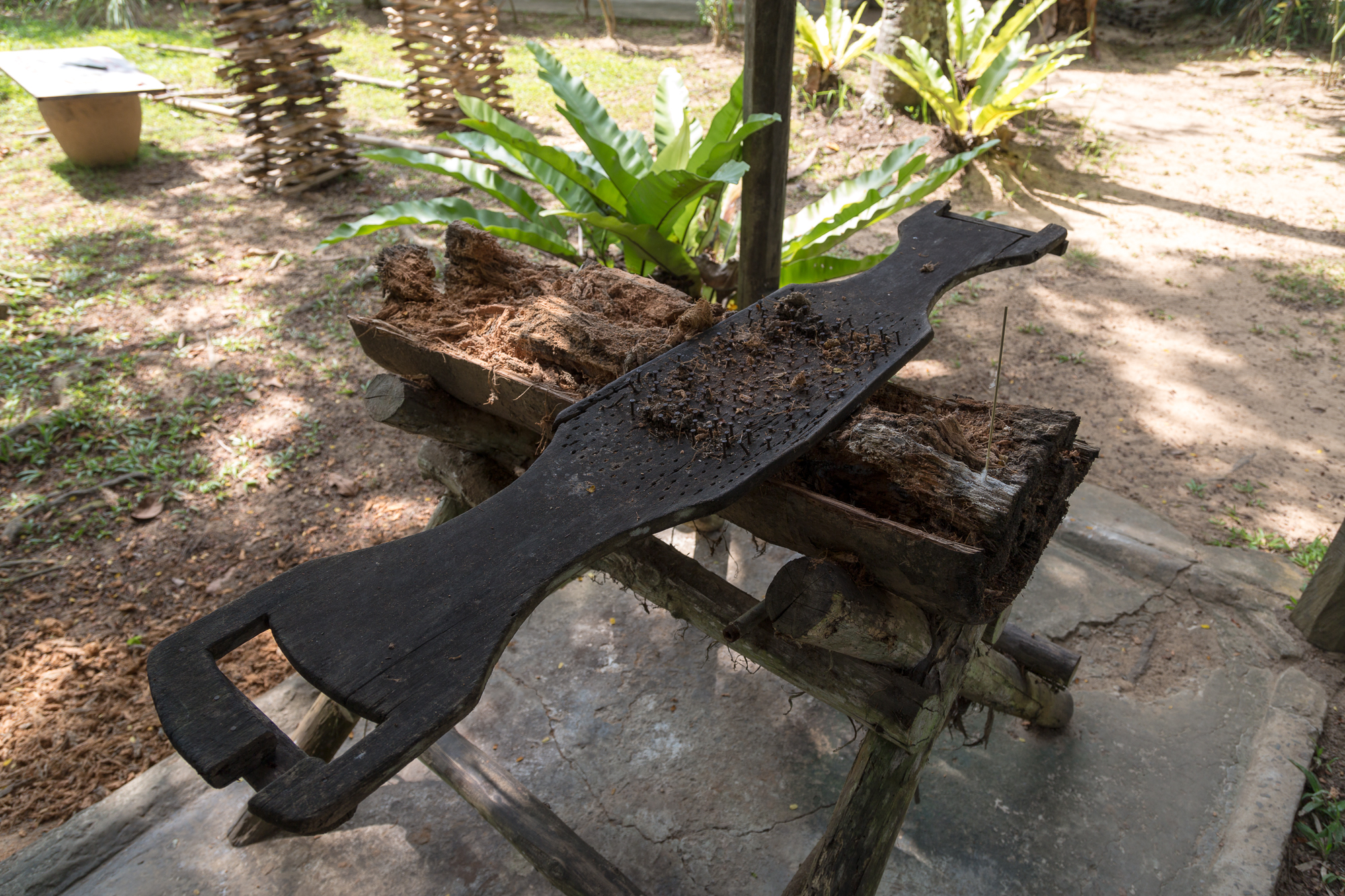
Traditional sago grinding machine

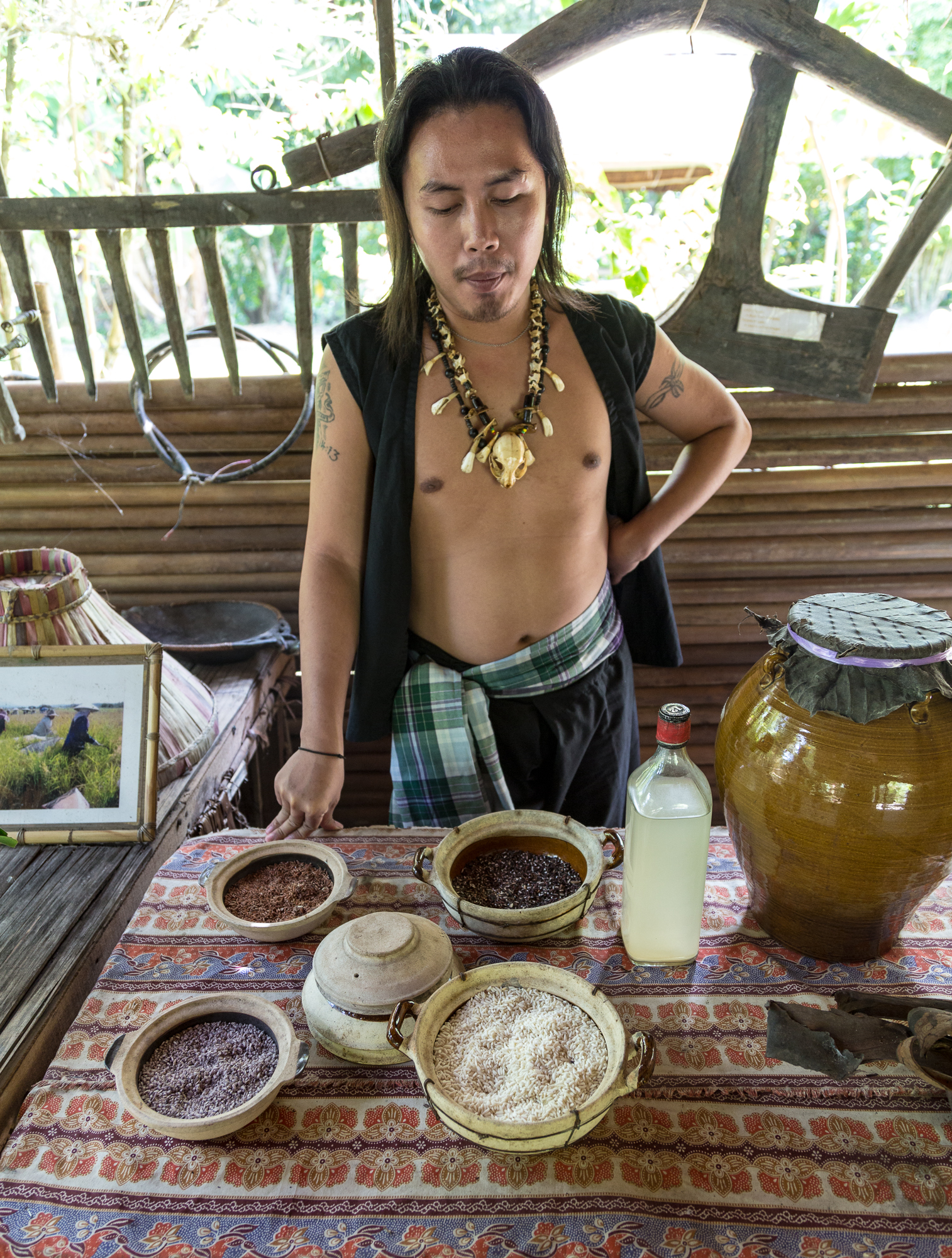
A Kadazan man presenting the different types of rice that are used to produce lihing, talak and sikat, traditional rice liqueurs of Sabah

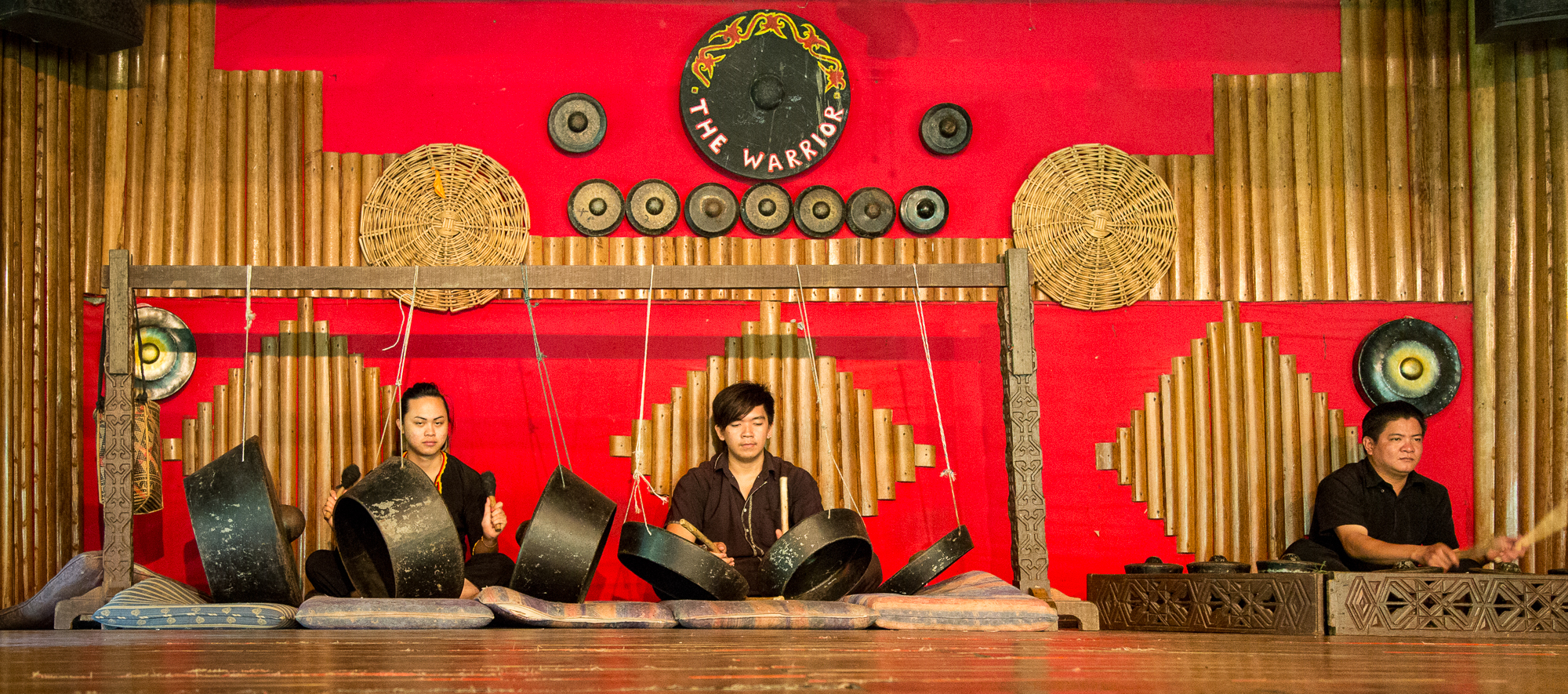
Gong performances at the heritage village

== See also ==
- List of open-air and living history museums
