= Bruno Madrigal =

Fictional character from Encanto

- Encanto character
- First appearance: Encanto (2021)
- Created by: Jared Bush; Byron Howard
- Voiced by: John Leguizamo

In-universe information
- Family: Alma (mother); Pedro (father); Julieta (triplet sister); Pepa (triplet sister)
- Relatives: Agustín (brother-in-law); Félix (brother-in-law); Isabela (niece); Luisa (niece); Mirabel (niece); Dolores (niece); Camilo (nephew); Antonio (nephew)
- Nationality: Colombian

Bruno Madrigal is a fictional character who appears in Walt Disney Animation Studios' animated film Encanto (2021). He was created by directors Byron Howard and Jared Bush and is voiced by Colombian-American actor John Leguizamo. Bruno is the ostracised uncle of Mirabel Madrigal and has the ability to see the future. Much of the character's design, including his green ruana, was inspired by traditional Colombian culture.

Bruno's name was chosen by songwriter Lin-Manuel Miranda as it was the best fit for the rhythm of the song "We Don't Talk About Bruno", in which family members and townsfolk share gossip and anecdotes explaining why they fear Bruno's prophecies. Initially introduced only from the other characters' perspectives within the verses of the song, Bruno appears later in the plot when Mirabel finds him secretly living in the walls of the family house with the rats. He helps her to save the magic in the house and eventually reconciles with the family.

Following the release of the film, Bruno achieved viral popularity on social media. Leguizamo has also received praise from critics for his humorous and tragic portrayal of the character. Therapists have theorised that Bruno may be neurodivergent or have a mental illness. Critical analysis of the Madrigals' neglect and demonisation of Bruno has raised discussions about how families treat members with mental illness and resolve issues around intergenerational trauma.

== Development ==
=== Concept and writing ===
After finishing their work on Zootopia (2016), Byron Howard and Jared Bush decided that they wanted their next project to be a musical. Songwriter Lin-Manuel Miranda, with whom they had previously worked with on Moana (2016), was interested in developing a Latin-American musical. Having previously worked on Moana, Miranda was involved early in the development process for Encanto. Bush and Howard's relationship with filmmakers Juan Rendon and Natalie Osma, who had previously worked on the documentary "Imagining Zootopia", initiated a casual conversation about Latin America culture, which over time influenced them to focus on Colombia. They eventually chose Colombia as the setting for Encanto due to its tradition of magical realism and diverse ethnicity. They decided to focus the plot on an extended family with each member being based on familiar archetypes to create relatable characters. Bush explained that the family's powers were devised as a natural extension of these archetypes in order to create "a magic born of emotion and personality and character".

The development phase for Encanto (2021) took five years with the story being repeatedly reworked by its six writers. According to Bush and Howard, a key addition to the team was writer and playwright Charise Castro Smith, whom they brought in two years into the project and a year later asked to be co-director. Castro Smith said that she spent a lot of time working on the character development with Bush and rewriting the screenplay "1700 times". The writers decided to focus the story on an unusually large cast of 12 main characters. According to Bush, the team conducted research by consulting therapists and psychologists: "One gave us an interesting stat: In a four-person family, each was asked 'Who is treated the best by the parents?' Their answers were never the same. It's about how you perceive yourself in the family."

During development, a team of five Disney employees took a research trip to Colombia, including writers and co-directors Bush and Howard. Alejandra Espinosa was the local guide for Disney on a four-day tour of Barichara, after which she was contracted as a cultural consultant. Rendon and Osma were the film's main consultants on Colombia and accompanied the team to Bogotá and Cartagena so that various aspects of Colombian culture could be incorporated into the film. They introduced the team to local artisans, architects, botanists and chefs to educate the team on Colombian history and culture and expose them to everyday life. In addition to the consultants, a group of Latin American Disney employees were consulted, who watched the film and provided feedback. Castro Smith said that this was beneficial to the film's development. The original story concept was to focus on a large diverse family that represented Afro-Colombians, while the character Bruno represented the indigenous people of Colombia, whom Espinosa commented are "invisible and nobody talks about them".

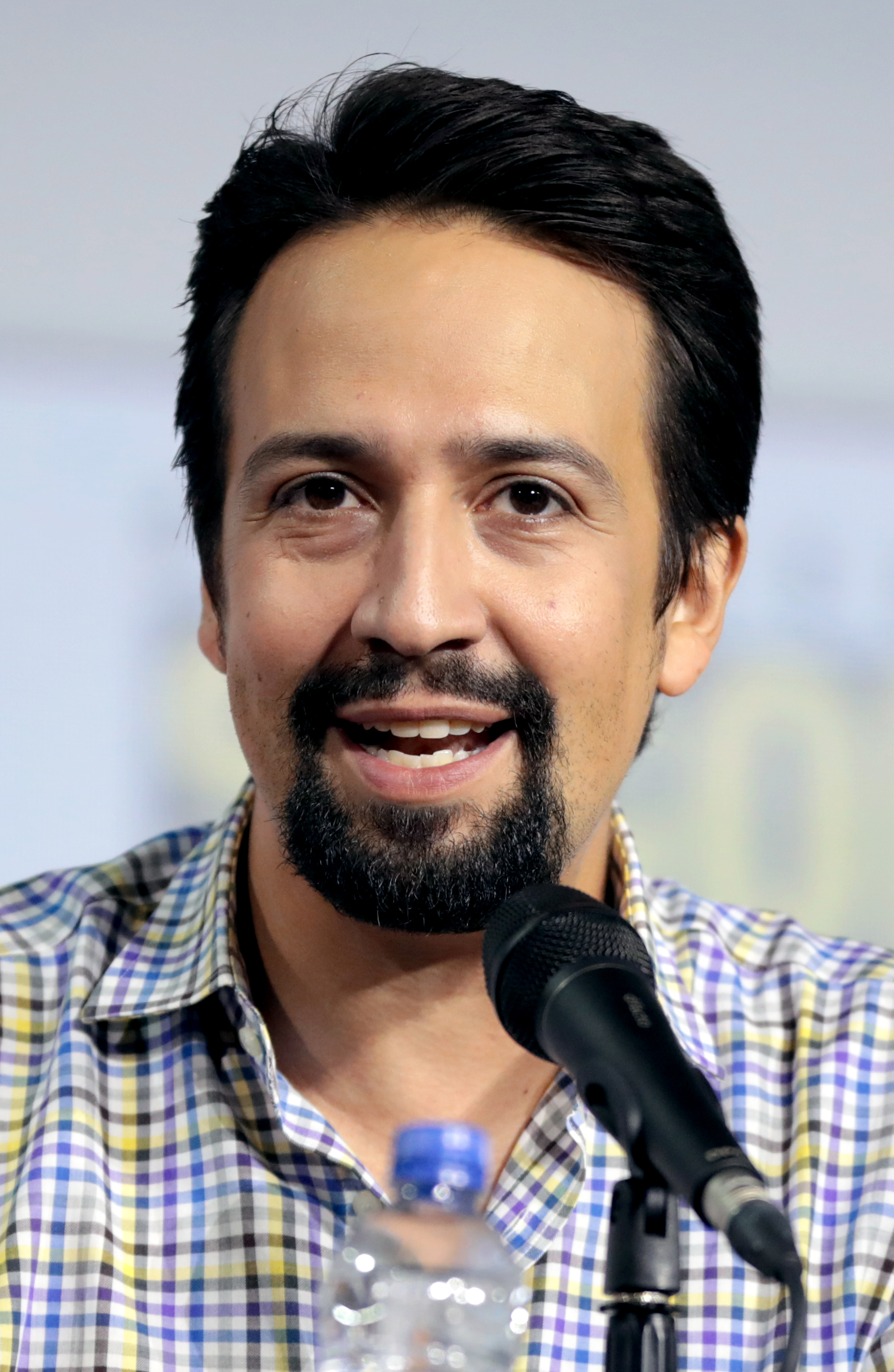
Lin-Manuel Miranda chose the name Bruno to fit the rhythm of the song "We Don't Talk About Bruno".

Bruno was originally younger, around the same age as Mirabel, and depicted as "kind of a chubbier, funnier uncle who she met earlier in the movie", according to Howard. Bruno's role changed once the writing team realised that his gift of precognition would cause other characters to reject him with tragic consequences. This story concept provided an interesting idea for Miranda to write a song that focused on the character being absent for ten years and developing a reputation based on gossip and misperception. Bruno was previously named Oscar, but the creative team looked for other names to avoid any potential legal issues with real-life Oscar Madrigals in Colombia. Miranda chose Bruno from a list of potential names, including Arlo, Andre, Anko, Marco, and Emo, because it allowed for the catchy line "We don't talk about Bruno no no no" in the Encanto song "We Don't Talk About Bruno". For Bruno's character development, story artist Mark Kennedy conducted research on people who have been confined or have no human communication: "I thought about what it would be like for Bruno to be burdened with this gift of being able to see the future - how would that affect his personality? How are people affected when they are shunned by their families?"

=== Design ===
A team of designers worked on Bruno's character design, including visual development artist Meg Park, who created his costume. Costume design lead Neysa Bove said that he was originally designed wearing a garment similar to a fortune teller in the 1900s, but after consulting with a team of Colombian experts, the design was changed to a traditional poncho. Emerald green was chosen as Bruno's main color because of the emerald trade of Colombia and for its mystical properties, such as the usage of emeralds to predict the future. The Quimbaya were used as a resource in designing the iconography on his poncho. Other details reflect Bruno's circumstances, including small holes added to his poncho caused by rats eating through the fabric and a grey tone added to his skin caused by a lack of sun exposure from living indoors. One idea for Bruno's costume was to have him wear a rug he found around the house. The final version of his costume is a ruana "meant to be the old ceremonial outfit that Bruno used to wear when he was having visions of the future for the people that came to see him", according to Park.

=== Voice ===
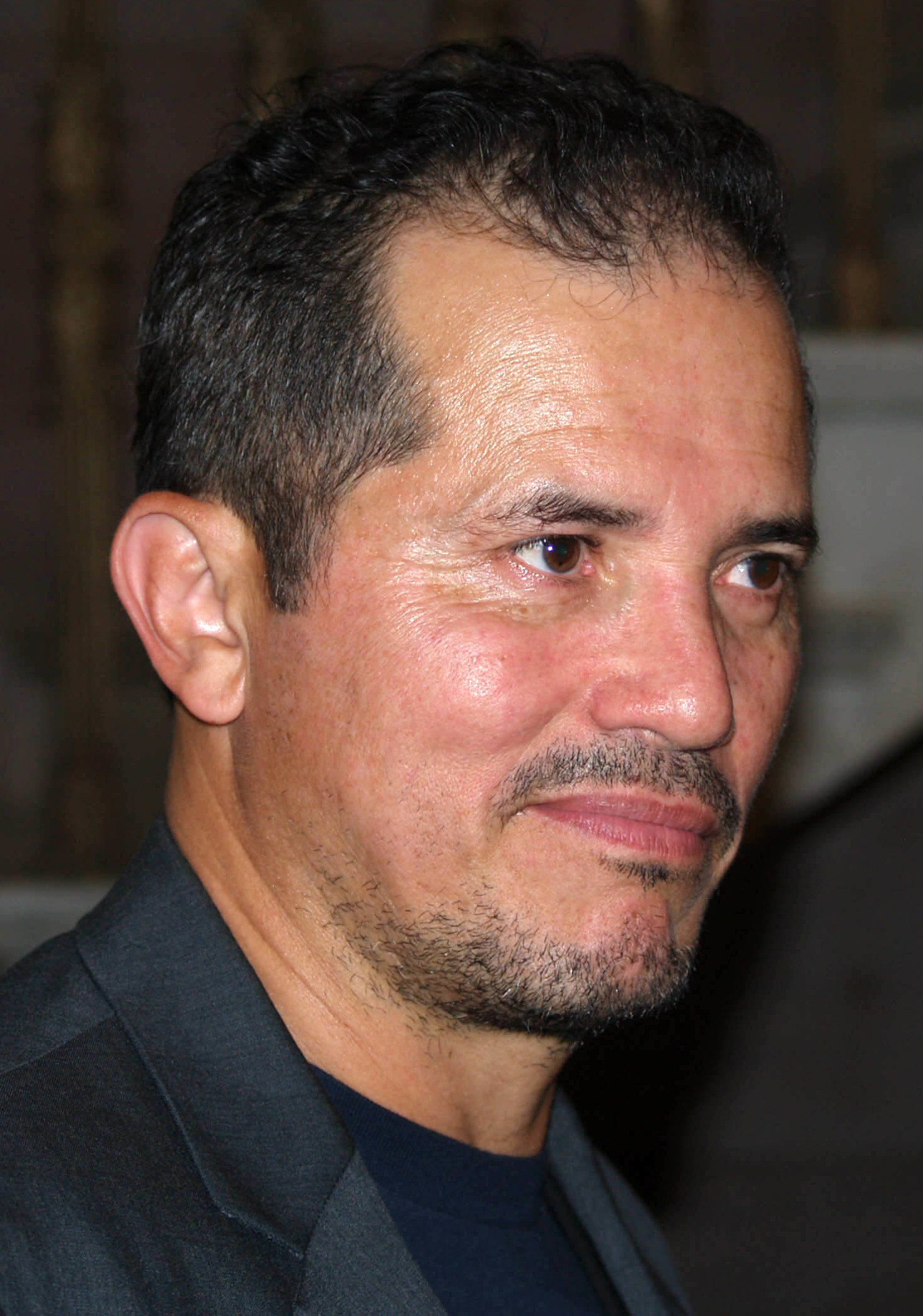
John Leguizamo is the voice of Bruno in Encanto.

American actor John Leguizamo, who was born in Bogotá, Colombia, voices Bruno in Encanto. He joined the cast after receiving a call from Miranda. He said that the film appealed to him due to it being an all-Latinx Disney movie, which he did not think he would see happen in his lifetime. Like Bruno he experienced similar feelings of being an outsider within his family: "I always would say what nobody wanted to hear, like Uncle Bruno. And I'm gonna get ostracized for that; for telling the truth, and for things coming true that are negative. I had a little bit of that negativity going on." He described Bruno as a "quirky offbeat guy who had bad social skills" and when voicing the character he was allowed to "go to the weirdest places because my intonations are really bizarre and offbeat".

Leguizamo worked with Howard and Bush on his portrayal of the character, which changed over time. He said that at the start Bruno was a little cockier but he ended up being more vulnerable and awkward. Leguizamo was given room to improvise according to Castro Smith, particularly in a scene in which Bruno recounts the plot of his constructed rat telenovela to Mirabel. Leguizamo admitted that he struggled with the singing part of the role. While recording a short rap section he asked Miranda for help: "we did it like a million times. I think it took two days to get it done."

== Appearances ==
=== Encanto ===
Bruno is a member of a set of fraternal triplets born to Alma and Pedro Madrigal. With the exception of his 15-year-old niece, Mirabel, every member of the family receives a magical gift on their fifth birthday; Bruno's gift is the ability of precognition. After Mirabel fails to receive a gift, Bruno is asked to conjure a vision to find out why and sees her standing in front of a broken Casita, their sentient home. Knowing that this vision would put Mirabel at odds with the rest of the family and the residents of the town who rely on the magic for help in their everyday lives, Bruno smashes the slab of glass bearing the vision and goes into hiding, concealing himself within the house's walls so he can still be near the family. Ten years later, Mirabel worries that the magic is breaking and questions other family members, discovering that Bruno might know something. In the song "We Don't Talk About Bruno", members of the Madrigal family and the people of the town recount their stories of Bruno's prophecies to Mirabel, focusing on their negative outcomes and blaming him for their misfortunes. Mirabel later finds Bruno in the walls of the house and he explains that her vision would change, suggesting that she may either destroy the family or remedy its troubles. At Mirabel's urging, he conjures a new vision that shows her that she needs to reconcile with her sister Isabela in order to save the family. Despite succeeding with Isabela, she and her grandmother Alma argue, resulting in the Casita collapsing and Mirabel fleeing to the border. Mirabel, Alma and Bruno resolve the fractures within the family, after which Bruno is welcomed home and helps to rebuild the Casita.

=== Merchandise ===
Bruno is featured in official Encanto merchandise, including clothing, toy sets and plush dolls. He was recreated as a Funko Pop! figure as part of the Disney collection.

=== Theme parks ===
Bruno and the members of the Madrigal family appeared in a projection show of "We Don't Talk About Bruno" for a limited time on the facade of the It's a Small World ride in April 2022 at Disneyland. In October 2022, Bruno was one of the character appearances at the Oogie Boogie Bash in Disney California Adventure Park at Disneyland.

== Reception ==
=== Analysis ===
"Everything [Bruno] predicts is super predictable. There's no malice in any single prediction. And I wanted that to be clear on your second and third viewing. Like, Oh, goldfish die. Oh, of course it was going to rain on her wedding day; she controls the weather and she's stressed out. Yeah, you grow a gut because we're getting older and your metabolism goes. There's actually no malice in any of these predictions. They're all super-lame predictions. But they're being described as if he's the worst."

— Lin-Manuel Miranda

CNN highlighted that therapists have theorized that Bruno may be neurodivergent or have a mental illness due to being different and exhibiting unusual mannerisms, such as knocking on wood. Mic writer Ian Kumamato thought that Bruno's subplot reflects the way that households disregard mental illness. He commented that unlike the other Madrigal family members whose powers are valued, Bruno's power of clairvoyance disturbs the family and results in him being ostracised. He noted that a close analysis of the song "We Don't Talk About Bruno" reveals that rather than having done anything wrong, the villagers find that Bruno is simply too candid: "They don't get him, and seem to not want their family to be 'flawed' by his presence. He's misunderstood, like so many others who deal with any kind of mental illness." Roxy Simons, writing for Newsweek, commented that the song reveals more about the other members of the family than Bruno himself, particularly in the verse in which his sister Pepa complains that he ruined her wedding day by approaching her with a "mischievous grin" and causing rain. She noted that Pepa has the power to change the weather, so in reality she was unable to control her own emotions. Bruno later explains that he was simply expressing his concern about her being stressed. Simons further noted that the verse sung by Dolores reveals that Bruno was an outsider because his visions left the family members "grappling with prophecies they couldn't understand". In addition, Simons highlighted that Camilo also misrepresents his uncle by describing him with exaggerated features and "rats along his back", which causes other characters to shun him even more.

Barbara Robles-Ramamurthy wrote for Psychology Today that in their pursuit of perfection, the family purposefully neglects and demonises him literally by not talking about him rather than being open to his gift and that this rejection or misunderstanding of children with mental illness is common. Derrick Knox and Glennie Leshen noted that out of the negative communal response to his visions, Bruno develops a fear of giving the family undesirable news and represses his thoughts and feelings. When he realises that one of his visions could create problems for Mirabel, he exiles himself within the walls of the family home and ceases to use his power of precognition. Upon meeting Mirabel, he experiences anxiety and uses avoidance tactics that, from a Freudian perspective results from his superego, which causes him to struggle with the pressures of being a member of the Madrigal family. Michelle Ann Abate said that Bruno is described in psychology as the "family scapegoat" because his visions challenge the family's claim of perfection. His ostracisation has a serious impact on his physical and psychological state, being pale and thin due to lack of sunlight, but also displaying obsessive-compulsive behaviour, such as holding his breath, counting and knocking on wood before entering a room. In addition, Bruno shows signs of multiple personality disorder by expressing himself using alter egos. Abate commented that although these habits are comical in the film, they illustrate the serious effects of being estranged from others. She further commented that Bruno's exile is really "an act of self-sacrificing love" and it is really the fault of the family for driving him away. BJ Colangerlo of SlashFilm noted that Bruno is initially presented as the villain, but ends up as one of the leading characters and felt that the film teaches viewers to treat similar people with more empathy. Daniel R. George also writing for Psychology Today highlighted that the song expresses the way that families suppress inconvenient truths and trauma. He further opined that Bruno symbolises the Carl Jung concept of the collective unconsciousness: "He is myth, intuition, the irrational, the shadow, archetypal energies, the stuff of prophecy and dreams."

=== Critical response ===
Variety described Bruno as the breakout star of Encanto noting his viral popularity on social media platforms, such as TikTok. After the release of the film on Disney+, fans began sharing their commentary about the film and posted songs and dances to "We Don't Talk About Bruno", while the song reached top place in the Hot 100 singles chart. In response, Castro Smith opined that this popularity was partially due to every family having an outcast or someone with the feeling of an outcast. Mychal Thompson of BuzzFeed felt that Bruno is highly relatable to millennials because he is the black sheep of the family, he is misunderstood by the older generation and practices mental self-care through various quirks, such as knocking on wood and avoiding cracks. Kristen Lopez of IndieWire disliked Bruno's late entrance in the film, commenting that Bruno and Mirabel are two halves of a coin and that Bruno's relationships with Mirabel and his mother create the central conflict of the narrative. CinemaBlend writer Sarah El-Mahmoud considered Bruno to be the most interesting character in Encanto for being the missing piece that ties the movie together and for his "affecting and hilarious" depiction. Princess Weekes of The Mary Sue described Bruno as her favourite character and commented that his situation is "painfully tragic" because he lives in the walls with the rats so that he can be near to his family. Rich Knight of CinemaBlend wanted to see an entire movie about Bruno, citing his "antsy troubled humor" and commenting that he is "seriously the best part of the movie".

Leguizamo's portrayal of the character has also received praise. USA Today writer Brian Truitt said that Bruno is voiced "endearingly well" and that, despite being absent at the start of the film, Bruno is a "scene-stealing" oddball character. Richard Roeper of the Chicago Sun-Times found Leguizamo's Bruno to be "hilariously eccentric". Forbes staff writer Scott Mendelson considered Leguizamo's voicing of the character to be the film's standout performance, highlighting both its comedic and tragic elements. The Times of India described Leguizamo's voice work as "remarkable" and Bruno as a "scene-stealer" within the character's limited screen time. In an IGN review of the film, Andrea Towers praised Leguizamo's performance for balancing humour with the character's deep-seated resentment, hurt and shame. Pete Hammond writing for Deadline said that Bruno is voiced "immaculately" by Leguizamo and praised Bruno for "stealing the whole show".

=== Impact ===
Following the release of Encanto, therapists discussed the way family secrets exemplified in the Madrigals' stories about Bruno are common signs of intergenerational trauma. A study at the University of Cambridge found that the film had the potential of offering therapeutic benefits to children's mental health who see themselves represented in the characters, with Bruno being the black sheep who rejects the family's coping mechanisms. Lucy Blake wrote for Psychology Today that the film shows that the Madrigals' happy ending is a challenging process that involves addressing their traumas, understanding the perspectives of others and finally "talking about Bruno".

=== Accolades ===
Leguizamo received several award nominations for voicing Bruno, including Best Voice Acting (Feature) category in the 2022 Annie Awards, Best Voice Acting category in the Austin Film Critics Association Awards 2021, Best Animated or VFX Performance category at the 5th Hollywood Critics Association Film Awards and Best Actor in a Feature Film category in the 2022 Imagen Awards.
