= Chilote =

Chilote may refer to:

- Chilote cap
- Chilote Spanish dialect
- Chilote horse
- Chilote poncho
- Chilotes, inhabitants of Chiloé Island
