= Ruana =

Poncho-style garment native to the Colombian and Venezuelan Andes

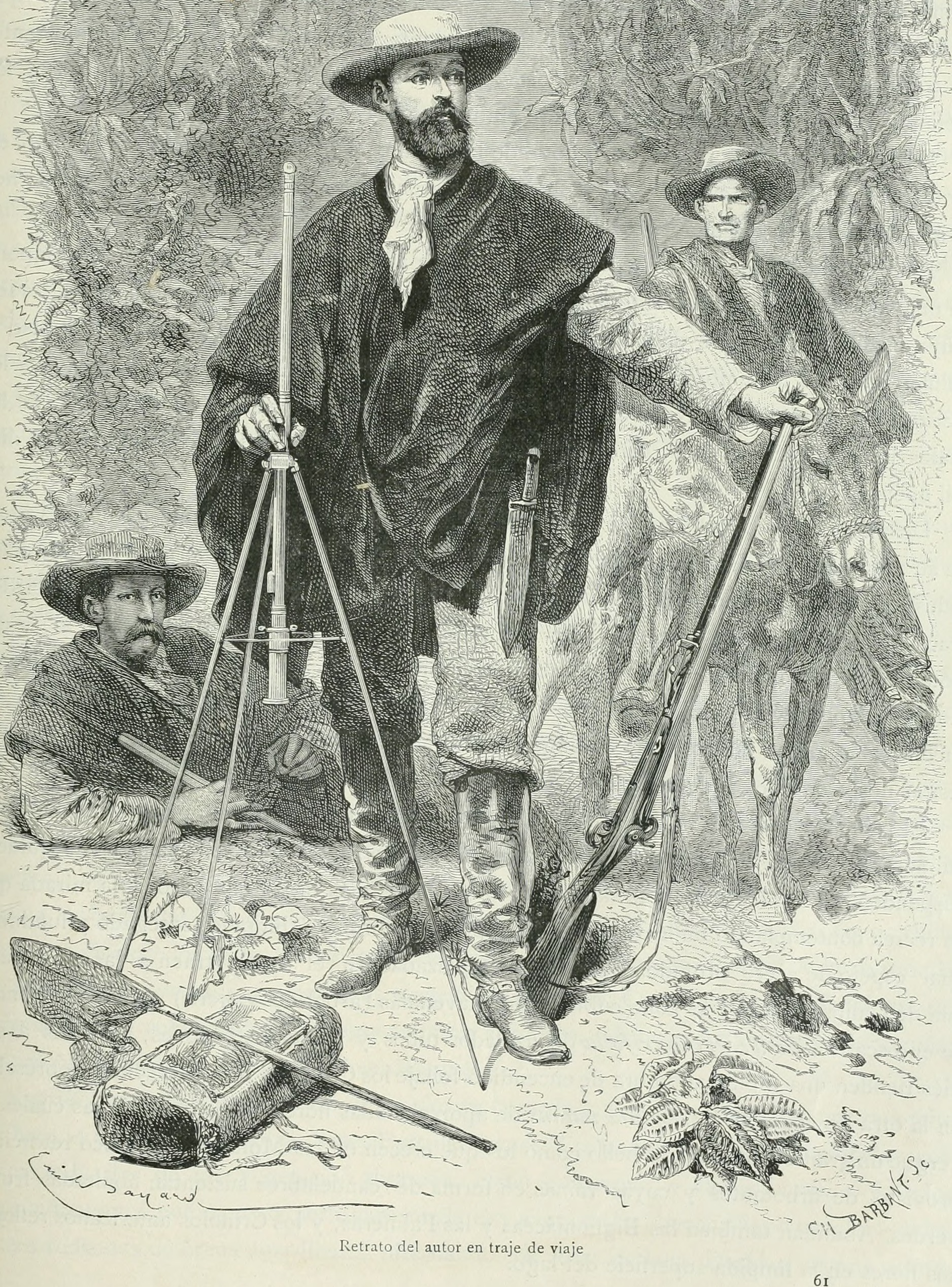
19th century, creole wearing a ruana

A ruana (possibly from Spanish ruana "relating to the street" or Quechua ruana "fabric") is a poncho-style outer garment native to the Colombian and Venezuelan Andes. In Colombia, the ruana is the characteristic and traditional garment of the department of Boyacá, initially made by indigenous and mestizo people, although it is also made in the departments of Cundinamarca, Antioquia, Nariño, Bogotá, Santander (Colombia), Norte de Santander and Caldas. In Venezuela it is widely used and made in the Andean states of Táchira, Mérida and Trujillo, used since the colonial times by all Venezuelan inhabitants, currently only in the Andean region its traditional use is maintained.

Similar to other poncho-like garments in Latin America, a ruana is basically a very thick, soft and sleeveless square or rectangular blanket with an opening in the center for the head to go through with a slit down the front to the hem. A ruana may or may not come with a hood to cover the head.

== Etymology and origin ==
The origin of this garment is still unknown. Some believe that it is a fusion of the Spanish capes with the traditional blanket of the Muisca and Timoto-cuica indigenous people; while others believe that they took that name from the cloths that the Spanish brought from Rouen in France.

The word ruana is of unknown origin but likely comes from the Spanish language "ruana" meaning woollen cloth, ragged, or street-related. However, albeit dubious, according to ProColombia (former Proexport), the official Colombian agency in charge of international tourism, foreign investment, and non-traditional exports, the word ruana comes from the Chibcha ruana meaning "Land of Blankets", used to refer to the woollen fabrics manufactured by the Muisca and timoto-cuicas natives.

Pre-Columbian Muisca (also known as Chibcha) peoples wore garments similar to the Ruana.

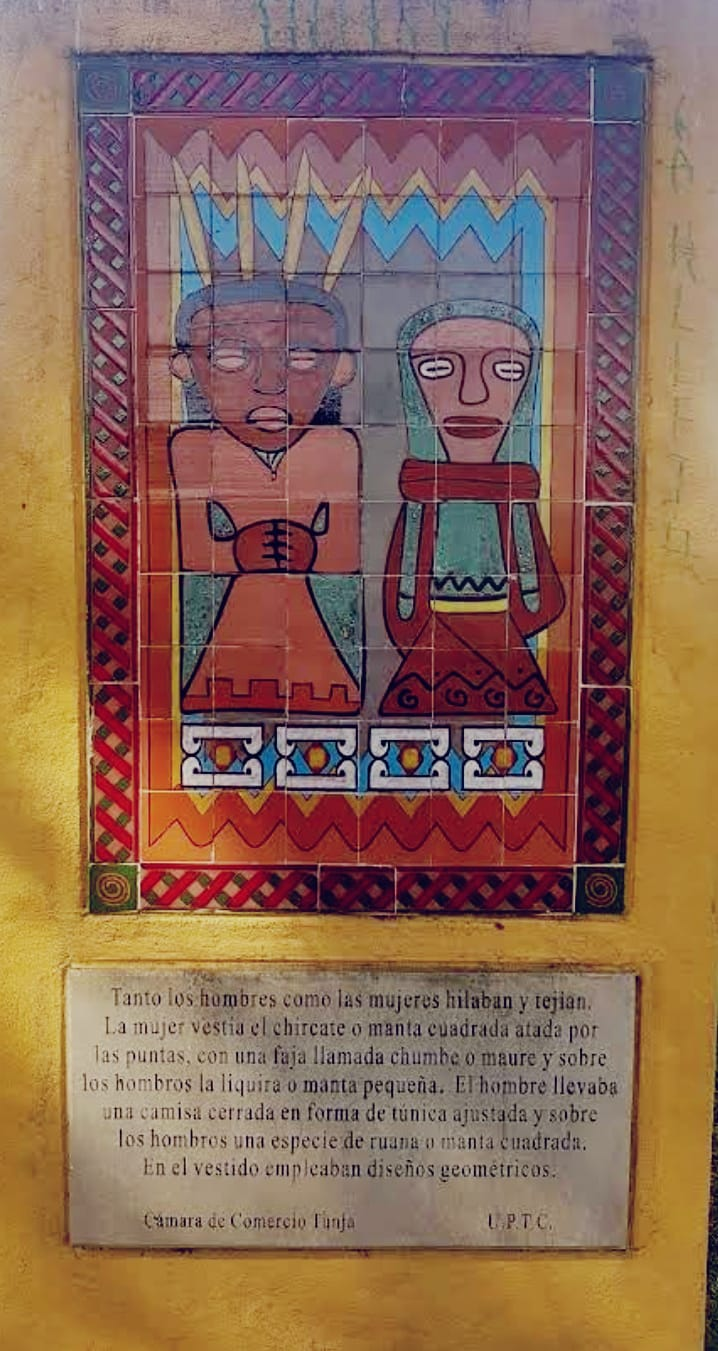
Pre-Columbian Ruana (Pozo de Hunzahúa) Tunja, Boyaca - Colombia

The ruanas worn by the native Muisca (Chibcha) were apparently made of wool and knee-long, well-suited to the low temperatures of the region where they were used not only as a piece of garment but also as a blanket for use in bed or to sit on as a cushion of sorts. Many ruanas are handcrafted with sheep's virgin wool. An 1856 watercolor shows an indigenous man in the Cordillera Occidental of Colombia weaving a ruana using a large foot-pedaled loom.

Other scholars argue that the modern ruana doesn't seem to have evolved from these nor it shows continuity from the regional pre-Hispanic garments, rather the ruana appears to have been introduced after the Spanish conquest by the uprooted foreign Quechua yanakuna slave-servants belonging to the defunct Inca Empire who were brought by the local Spanish hacendados in order to work the lands during the early Colonial period.

== Colombia ==
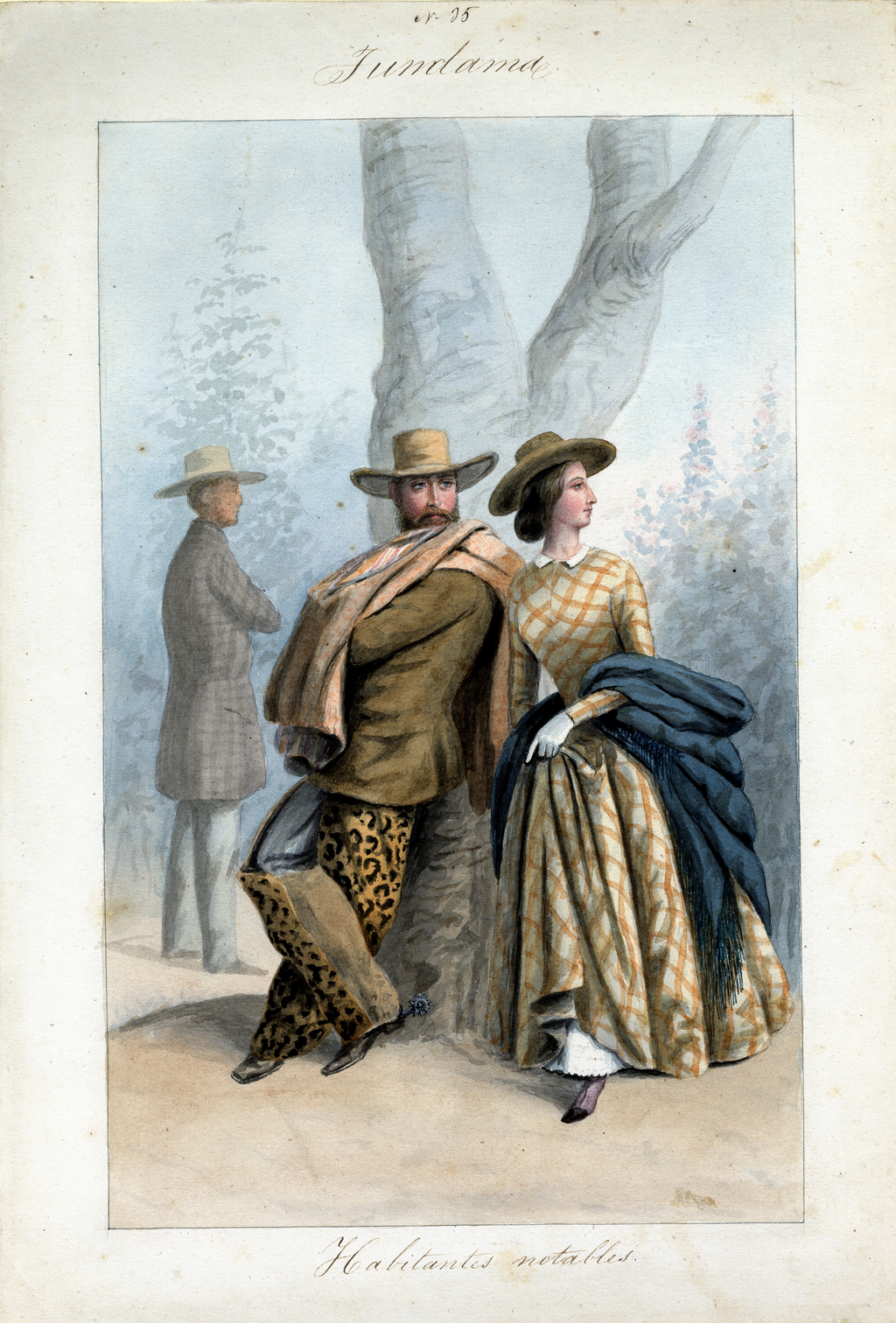
Nobles form Tundama province, modern Boyacá

=== Boyacá y Cundinamarca ===
In Colombia there are two festivals in honor of the ruana, both in municipalities of the department of Boyacá: the World Day of Ruana, in Nobsa, and the National Festival of Ruana, Pañolón, Almojábana and Amasijo, in Paipa. This unique garment is also a fundamental part of the idiosyncrasy of Boyacense popular music known as Carranga, music that was born in the rural areas of that department and is mainly accompanied by the Tiple, the Guitar and the Tiple Requinto (chordophone) of Colombia. Currently this genre has been renewed with more alternative groups such as the "Velo de Oza" and the "Rolling Ruanas".

=== Antioquia ===
In Antioquia, the ruana was part of the clothing worn by the peasants of this region, as also was the cabuya espadrilles, Aguadeño hat, machete, Carriel, the cowhide and of course the ruana. The ruana is made of sheep's wool and has dark colors. Formerly it had as ornament large red and yellow stripes, but day by day the ruana has been made simpler. Over the days the black ruana became very common. Also the dark blue and the dark gray, almost black.

=== Caldas ===
In the department of Caldas, the ruana is derived both from the Antioqueña ruana (poncho) and from the Boyacense ruana made of sheep's wool, thanks to the colonizations that people of these regions made at different times. The ruana is popular and in cold-weather towns such as Marulanda, Manzanares, Letras and in other paramo areas near Nevado del Ruiz.

== Venezuela ==
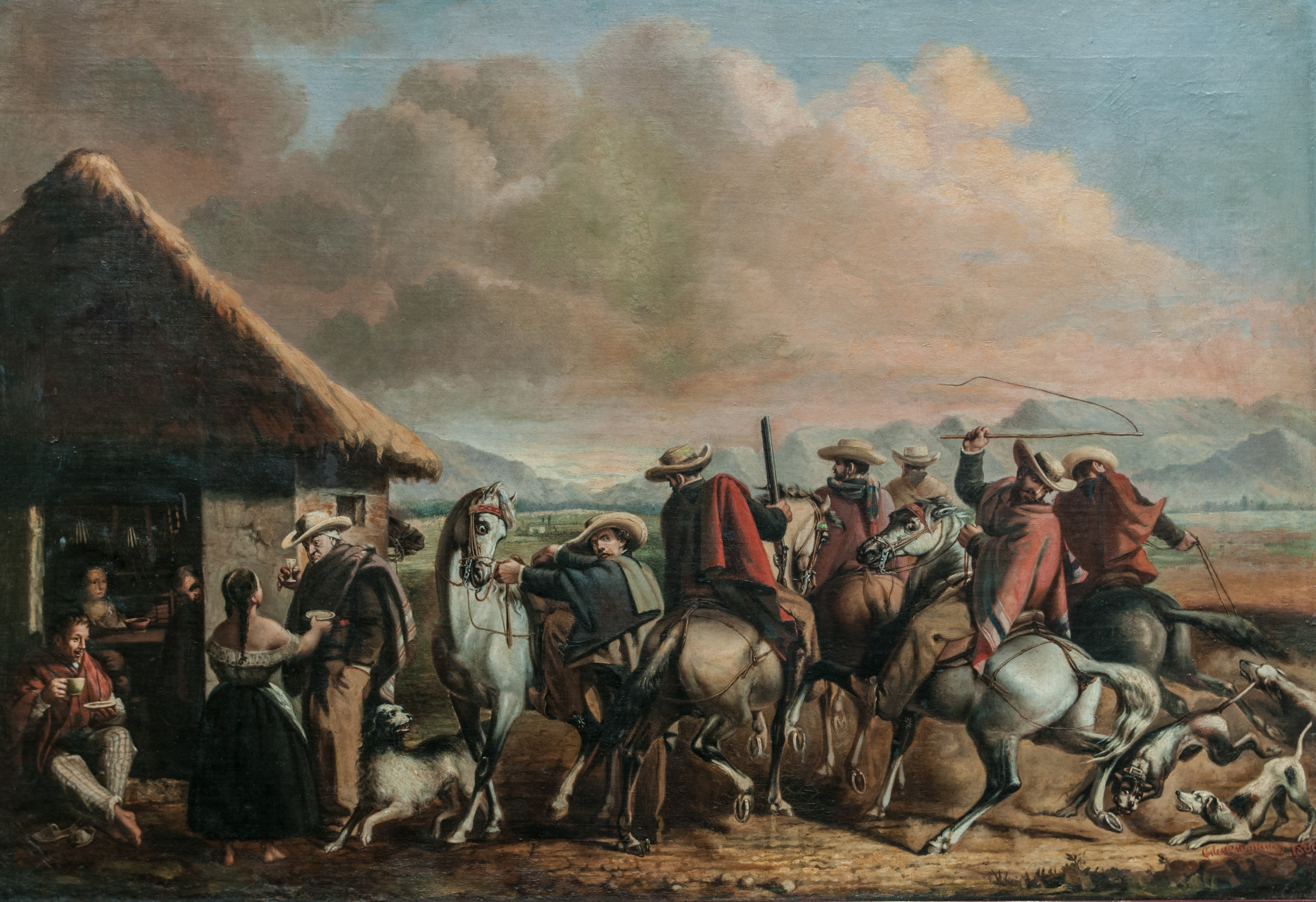
19th century, Venezuelan hunters wearing ruanas or "cobijas"

In Venezuela it is the typical attire of the Mérida mountain range, becoming the characteristic clothing of the "gochos". In Venezuela, before the "Andean hegemony", the ruana or blanket was used by the entire population as a garment to protect themselves from the sun in the hot lands or as a garment to protect themselves from the cold in the highlands, as noted by Ramón Páez in "Wild Scenes in South America; or life in the Venezuelan llanos" and Captain Vowels in "las sabanas de Barinas"

«...They used a thick wool blanket to keep the body cool and humid during the day and warm at night (...) the usual thing was to wear a double blanket, what we now call reversible, formed with overlapping fabrics: dark blue and red intense. For the humid days they used the blue color outwards; and on very sunny days, they would turn the ruana so that the red color was out.»

— Ramón Páez

«...This coat is given the name of blanket or jacket, which consists of a square of cloth, with a double red and blue cap, with the collar in the center.»

— Captain Vowel

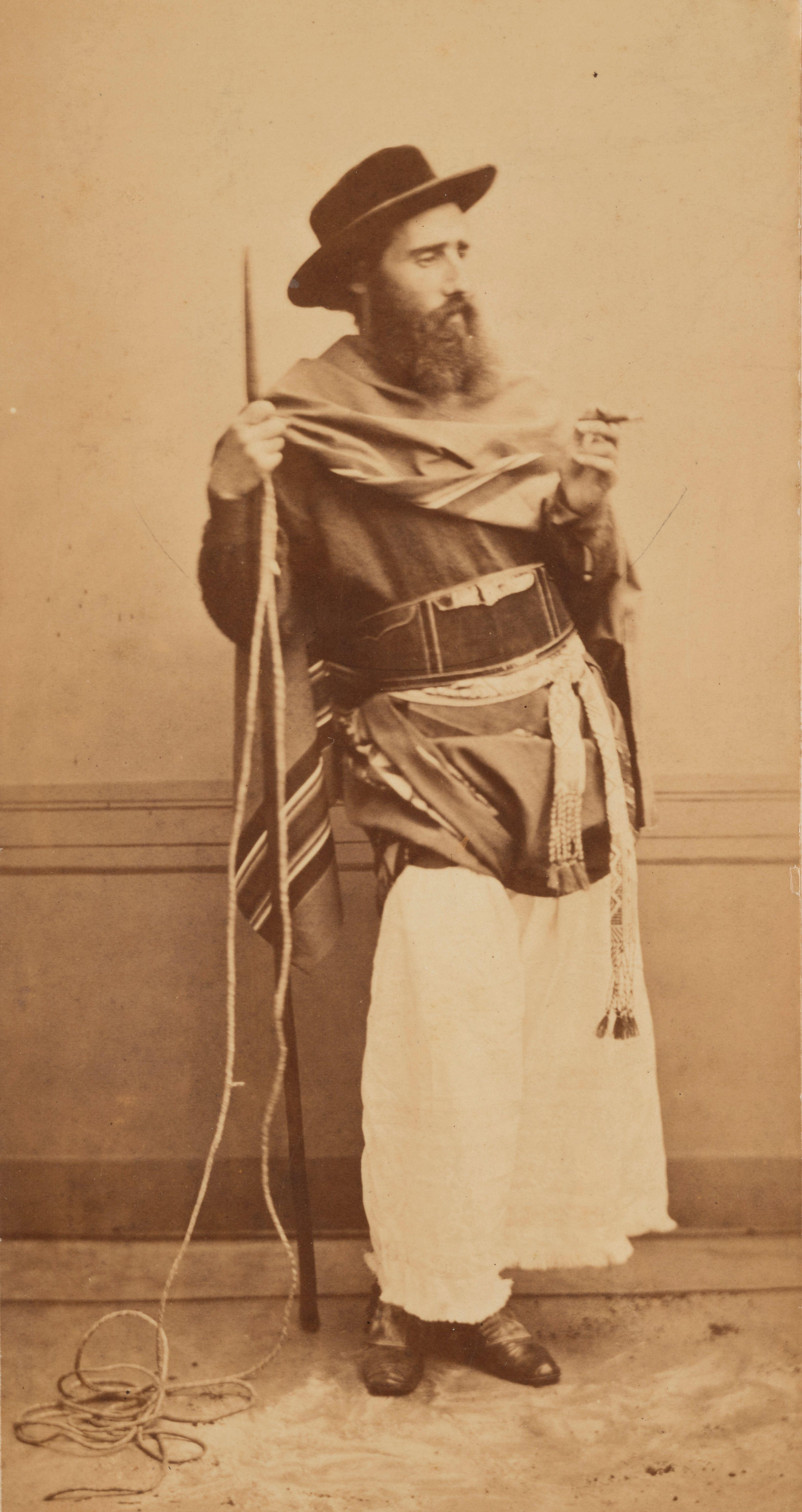
19th century, Camille Pissarro wearing a llanero costume and a ruana

In the Venezuelan Andes they were used without discrimination by all the population, which fascinated the German painter Ferdinand Bellermann. According to the information of the time, the ruana was composed of a single color, and in the Andes they were handcrafted from animal fabrics to protect themselves from the cold, while in the plains it was lighter to protect themselves from the heat. This garment has lost its daily use and now it is only wore culturally or in the upper regions of the Mérida mountain range.

«They also carry many small brown blankets, the men are almost always wrapped in blankets and they wear hats trimmed with waxed fabrics of all colors; on horseback they wear riding breeches made of tiger skins or bears...»

— Ferdinand Bellermann

== See also ==
- Aguayo
- Cape
- Cloak
- Poncho
- Sarape
