= Mapuche textiles =

Textiles traditions of the indigenous Mapuche people

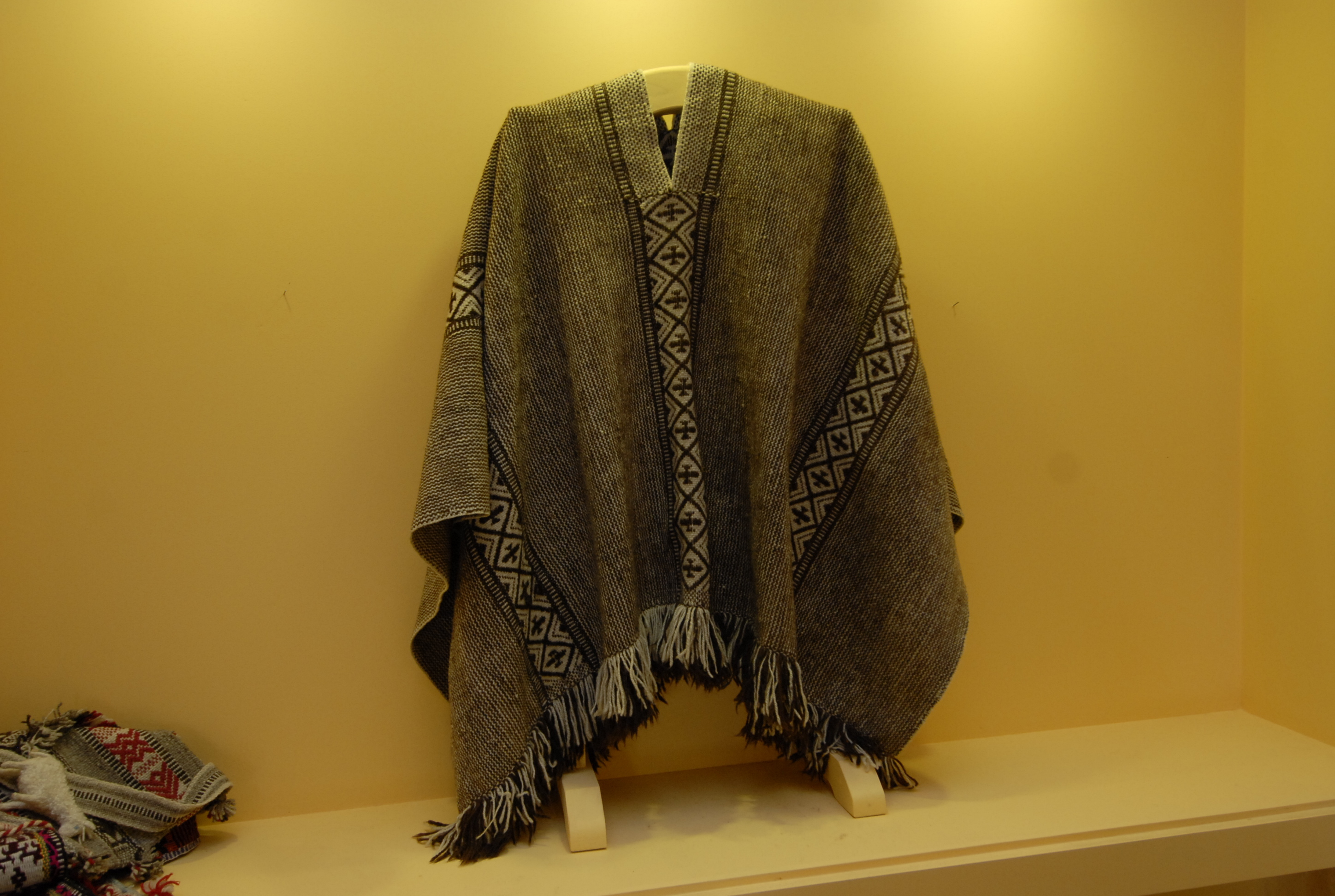
Traditional Mapuche poncho exhibited in Museo Artesanía Chilena.

One of the best-known arts of the Mapuche is their textiles. The tradition of Mapuche textile production dates back to pre-Hispanic times and continues up to this day. Prior to the 20th century, Mapuche textiles and, in particular, ponchos were important trade items.

== History ==
In Andean societies, textiles had a great importance and served many purposes, being used as clothing, as tools, as shelters, and as status symbols. In the Araucanía region during the sixteenth and seventeenth centuries, as reported by various chroniclers of Chile, the Mapuche worked to have Hispanic clothing and fabrics included as a trophy of war in treaties with the Spanish. They dressed their dead in their best clothes and finest textiles for their funerals.

The oldest data on textiles in the southernmost areas of the American continent (southern Chile and Argentina today) are found in some archaeological excavations, such as those of Pitrén Cemetery near the city of Temuco and the Alboyanco site in the Biobío Region, both within Chile, as well as the Rebolledo Arriba Cemetery in Neuquén Province, Argentina. In these locations, researchers have found evidence of fabrics made with complex techniques and designs, dating them to between AD 1300-1350.

The oldest historical documents that refer to textile art among the indigenous peoples of southern Chilean and Argentine territory date from the sixteenth century and consist of chronicles of European explorers and settlers. These accounts state that, at the time of European arrival in the region of the Araucanía, local natives wore textiles made with camelid hair (alpaca and llamas) and fur. Later, after the Spanish introduced sheep, they began breeding these animals and using their wool for their weaving. Gradually wool replaced the use of camelid hair. By the end of the sixteenth century, the indigenous people had bred sheep with more robust bodies and thicker and longer wool than those imported by the Europeans. These new breeds were better suited to local conditions.

=== Production ===
The Mapuche women were responsible for spinning and weaving textiles. Knowledge of both weaving techniques and textile patterns particular to the locality were usually transmitted within the family, with mothers, grandmothers, and aunts teaching young girls within their family the skills they had learned from their own elders. Women who excelled in the textile arts were highly honored for their accomplishments and contributed economically and culturally to their kinship group. Men were expected to give a larger dowry for a bride who was an accomplished weaver.

=== Trade ===
The Mapuche used their textiles as an important surplus and an exchange trading good. Numerous 16th-century accounts describe their bartering of the textiles with other indigenous peoples and with colonists in newly developed settlements. Such trading enabled the Mapuche to obtain goods that they did not produce or held in high esteem, such as horses. Tissue volumes made by Aboriginal women and marketed in the Araucanía and the north of Argentine Patagonia were quite valuable and constitute a vital economic resource for indigenous families. The production of fabrics in the time before European settlement was rather intended for uses beyond domestic consumption. 19th century Mapuche ponchos were considered superior to non-indigenous Chilean textiles and of good quality when compared to contemporary European wool textiles. According to reports of the time, a Mapuche poncho could be traded for several horses or up to seventy kilos of yerba mate.

== Current use and production ==
At present, the fabrics woven by the Mapuche continue to be used for domestic purposes, as well as for gift, sale, or barter. Most Mapuche women and their families now wear garments with foreign designs and tailored with materials of industrial origin, but they continue to weave ponchos, blankets, bands, and belts for regular use. Many of the fabrics are woven for trade, and in many cases, are an important source of income for families.

Many Mapuche women continue to weave fabrics according to the customs of their ancestors and transmit their knowledge in the same way: within domestic life, from mother to daughter, and from grandmothers to granddaughters. This form of learning is based on gestural imitation, and only rarely, and when strictly necessary, the apprentice receives explicit instructions or help from their instructors. Knowledge is transmitted as fabric is woven, the weaving and transmission of knowledge go together.
