= Bycocket =

Medieval brimmed hat

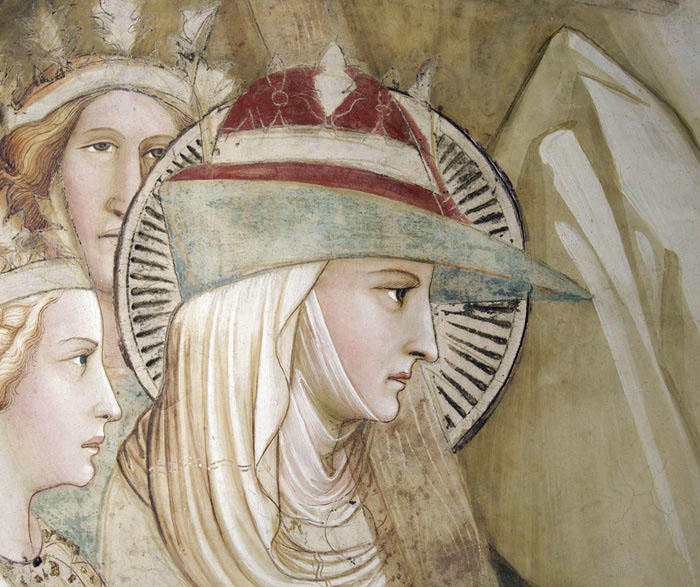
Depiction of St. Helena wearing a bycocket (circa 1380)

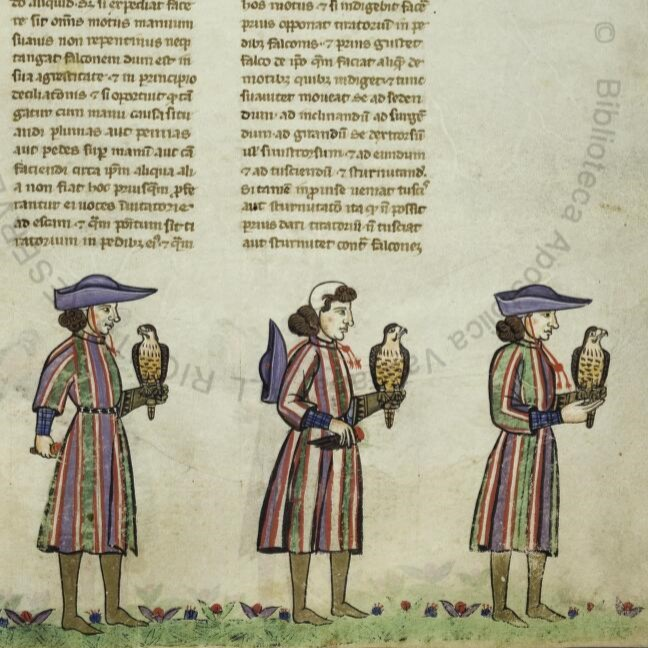
Falconers wearing bycocket caps (circa 1240)

A bycocket or bycoket is a style of hat that was fashionable for both men and women in Western Europe from the early 13th to the 16th century. It has a wide brim that is turned up in the back and pointed in the front like a bird's beak. The use of the name bycocket is based on a misunderstanding by Planché, and was in the 15th century probably describing the armet. In French, it is called a chapeau à bec due to this resemblance.

The hat was originally worn by nobles and royalty, and later by the rising merchant class. It was often decorated with feathers, jewels, or other ornaments. Today, it is commonly associated with the character Robin Hood.

The earliest known illustration to depict this type of hat comes from the English BSB Clm 835 Psalter of 1200-1225, where David is fighting Goliath while his hat falls off. The second known is from the German Falconry book of Frederick II, Holy Roman Emperor, De arte venandi cum avibus of c. 1240, as shown above. The third known is from the French WLB Cod.Don.186 Psalter of 1260-1270.

With this information, we can only assume that the hat was invented in England, spread to Germany and then France.

== See also ==
- List of hat styles
