= Kupiah =

Indonesian headgear

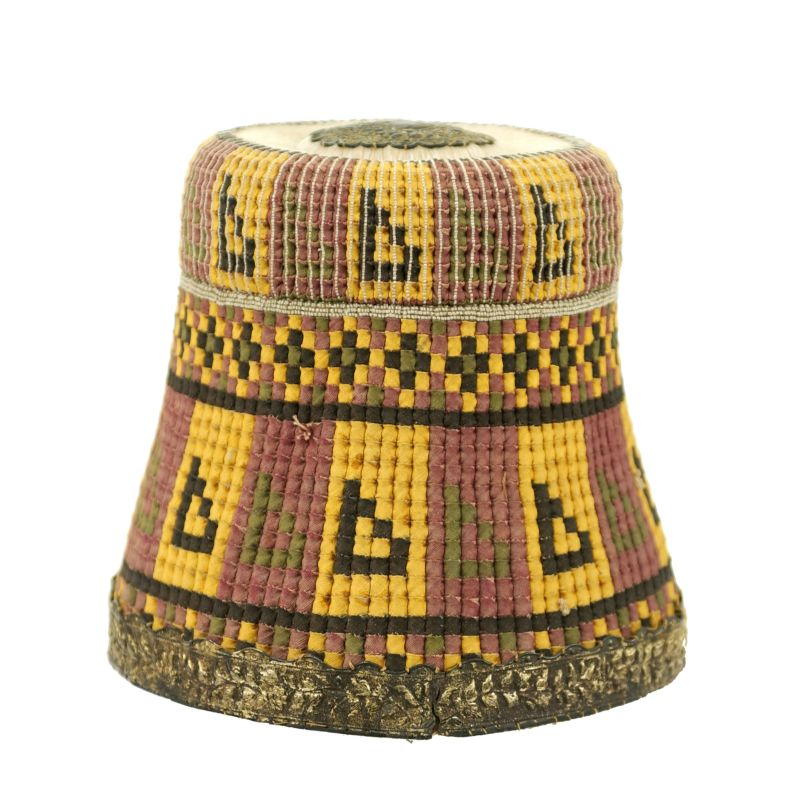
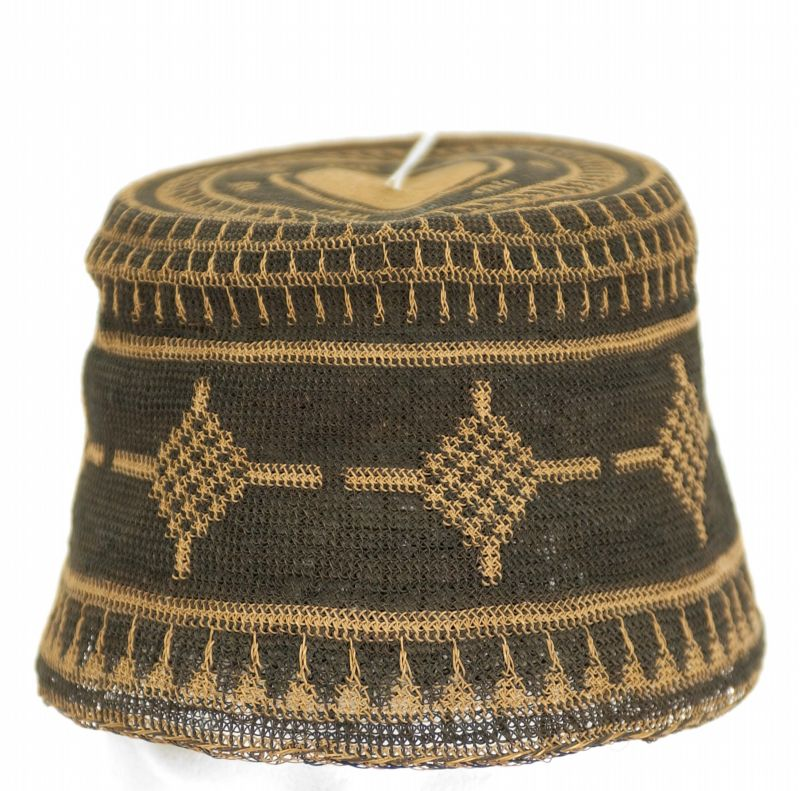
- Kupiah meukeutob (left) and kupiah riman (right)
- Type: Traditional cap
- Place of origin: Indonesia (Aceh)

A kupiah is a cap that originates from Aceh, Indonesia. There are two types: kupiah meukeutob and kupiah riman. Kupiahs are worn by Acehnese men as an everyday wear or specifically in ceremonies such as in a wedding.

== History ==
During the Sultanate of Aceh, kupiah meukeutob were worn specially for sultans and ulemas, while the kupiah riman were worn by noblemen and ordinary people. The use of kupiah meukeutob is believed to have begun in Sultan Iskandar Muda's reign, and in the 19th century, kupiah meukeutob were famously used by Indonesian national heroes from Aceh, such as Teuku Umar and Panglima Polem.

== Gallery ==
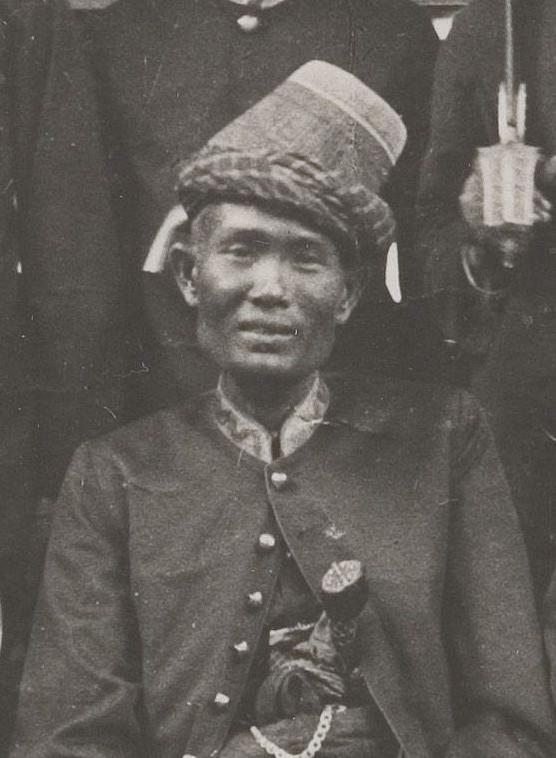
Teuku Umar, Indonesian national hero

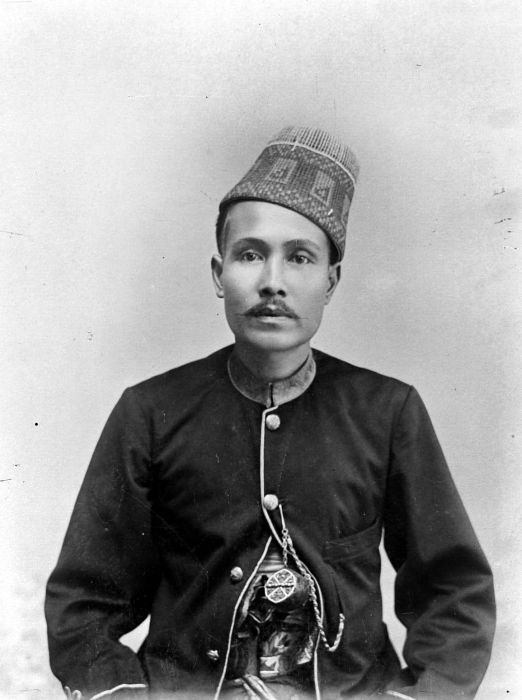
Sultan Muhammad Daud Syah

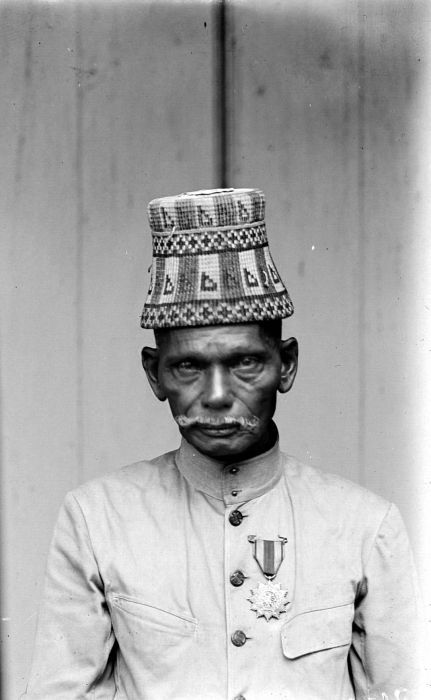
Acehnese nobleman, 1940

== See also ==
- List of hat styles
- Kopiah
