= Labbadeh =

Traditional Lebanese men's headdress

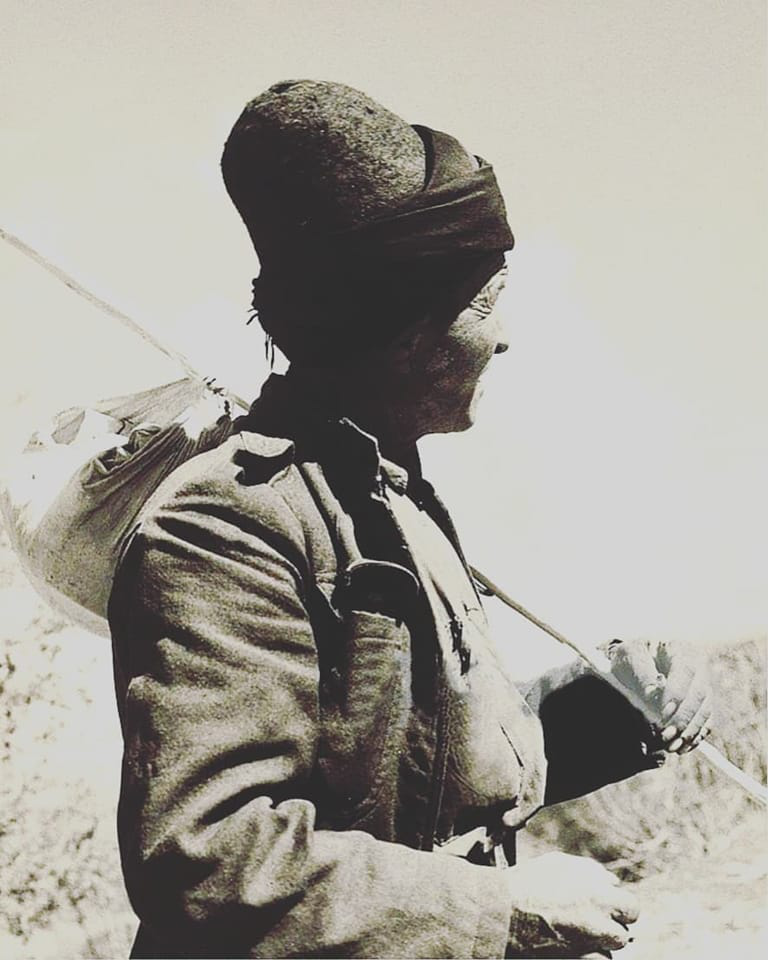
Lebanese farmer wearing a labbadeh with a black scarf as he goes to work, 1925

The Labbadeh (Note: Also spelled as Lebbadeh, Lubbaddah, Labbade or Labbada) (Arabic: اللبادة, lit. 'beaten') is a conical brimless felt cap traditionally worn by Lebanese men.

It is made from sheep's wool and is usually combined with a black scarf during work and with a white silk scarf for celebratory, leisure and formal events.

The origin of the labbadeh goes back to ancient times, depictions of it were found in Byblos, Kamid al-Lawz, Aleppo and Tel Michal.

The fashion persisted into medieval times among the Christians of northern Mount Lebanon, where it was especially useful for its natural water-resistance against rain and providing warmth during the cold winters of the mountain. The labbadeh survived into the modern era still being used by some villagers as well as becoming a national symbol of Lebanon as a part of the traditional folk costume of the country.

== Etymology ==
The word labbadeh comes from the Lebanese Arabic word libada which translates to "beat" or "beaten" and is a reference to the beating of wool in the felting process of which it is made.

== Process ==
The making of the labbadeh is a hand-made felting process. First, the wool threads must be finely separated from one another before being saturated with soap and water. Then, the wool threads are mixed together again and beaten until they solidify into a labbadeh. The finished product is then soaked with water and put out to dry.

== History ==
The Lebanese Labbadeh goes back to Phoenician times. Statuettes assumed to be votive offerings have been found scattered across the Levant with the most numerous found in ancient Phoenician temples in Byblos where they have since been dubbed the Byblos figurines.

According to the Lebanese archaeologist Maurice Chehab:

A good number of statuettes, placed in these vases, are depicted in full motion and wearing the lebbadé or conical cap, which is still in use in certain regions of Lebanese high mountain. This headdress was held on the head by a chinstrap. One of the ex-votos included several dozen of these statuettes so similar that one can imagine that they represented a troop that would have offered their sponsors [effigies] to the temple before embarking.

The use of the labbadeh for practical purposes began to decline around the mid-20th century. However, the headdress is experiencing a revival movement notably in the village of Hrajel where a workshop has been opened by local farmer Youssef Akiki with the intent of preserving the tradition and knowledge of the labbadeh.

== Gallery ==
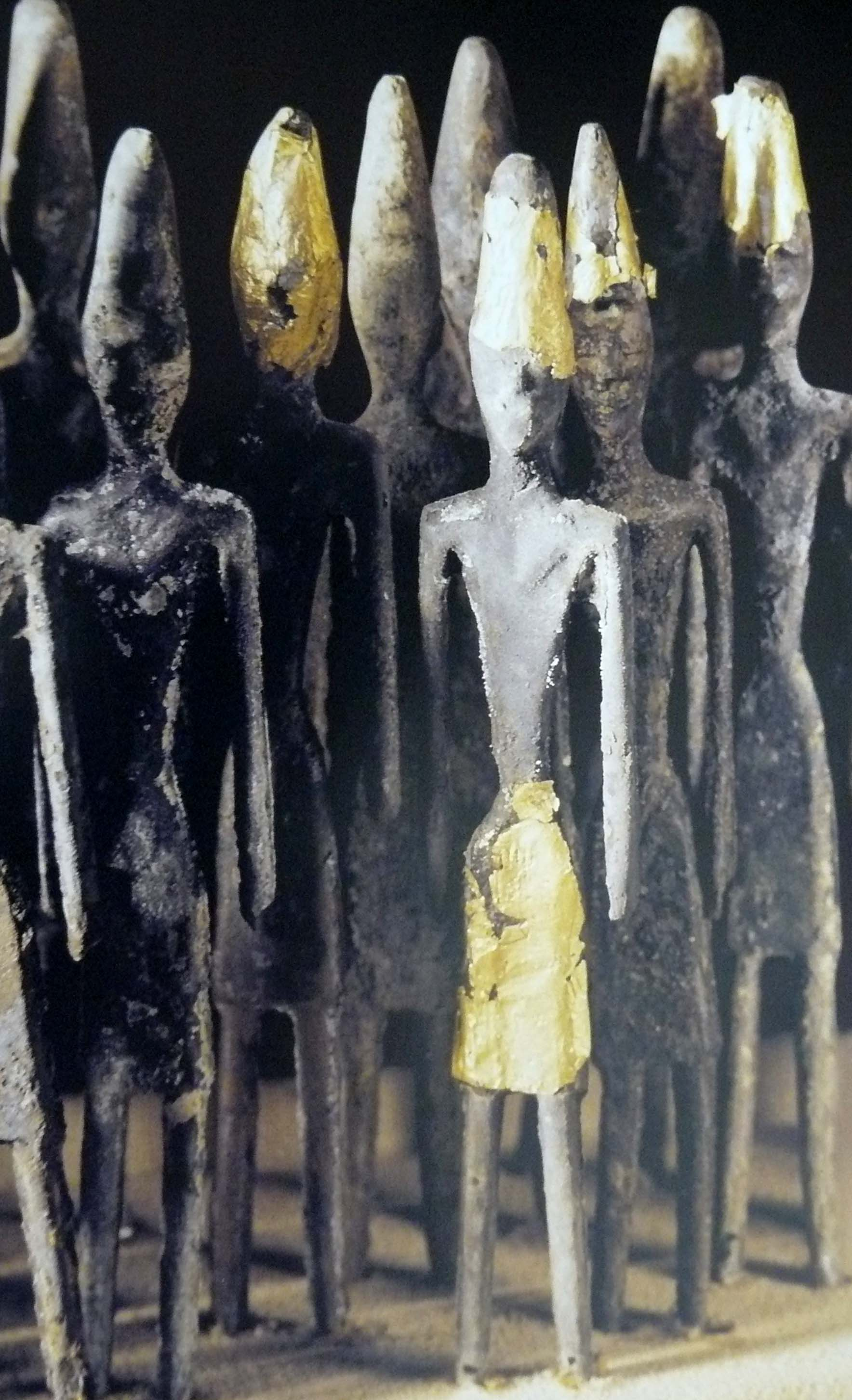
Byblos figurines showing some of the oldest depictions of the labbadeh

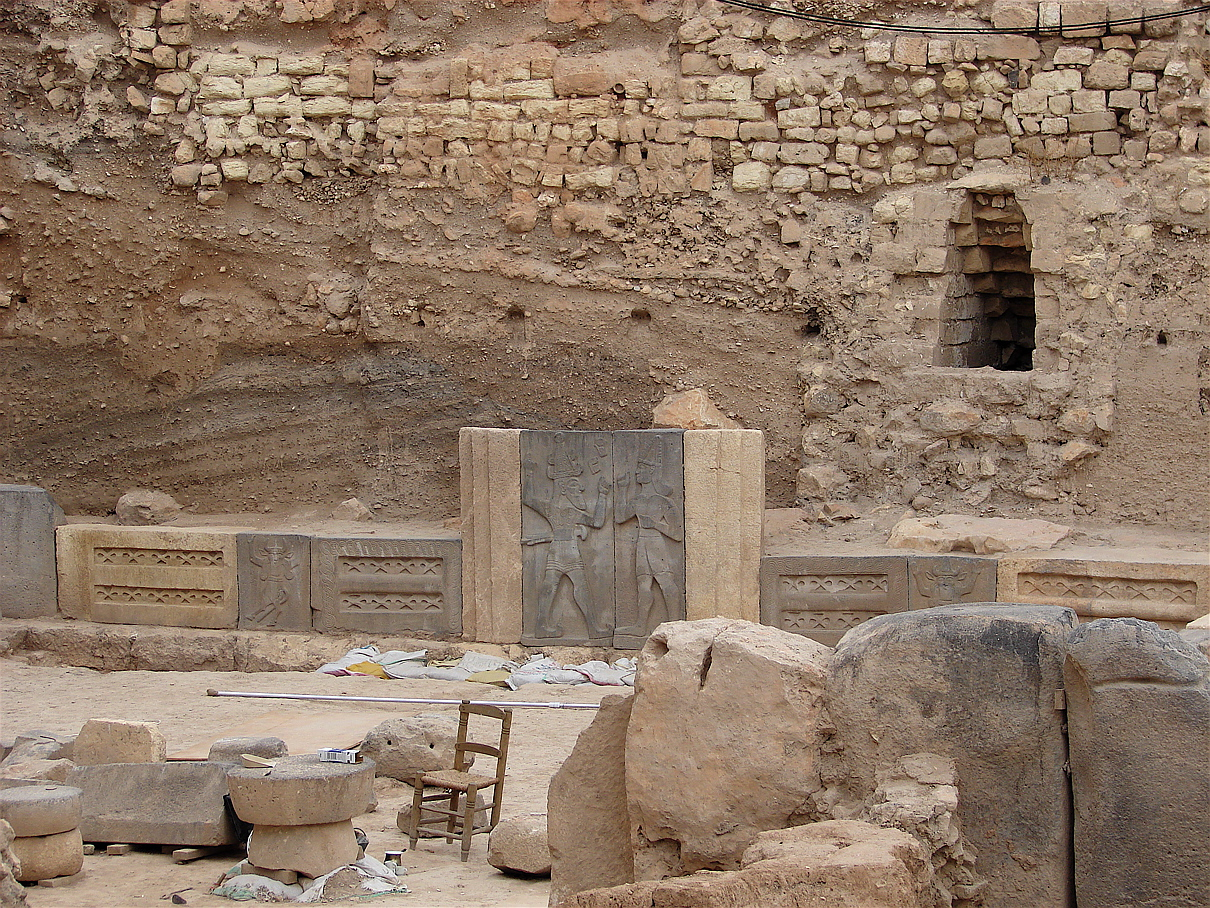
Temple of Hadad within the Citadel of Aleppo with an engraving of two men wearing ornate forms of the labbadeh

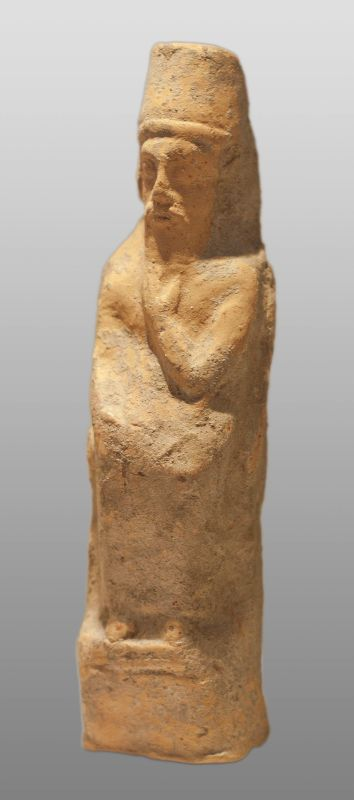
Statuette of a deity wearing a labbadeh, found in Tel Michal

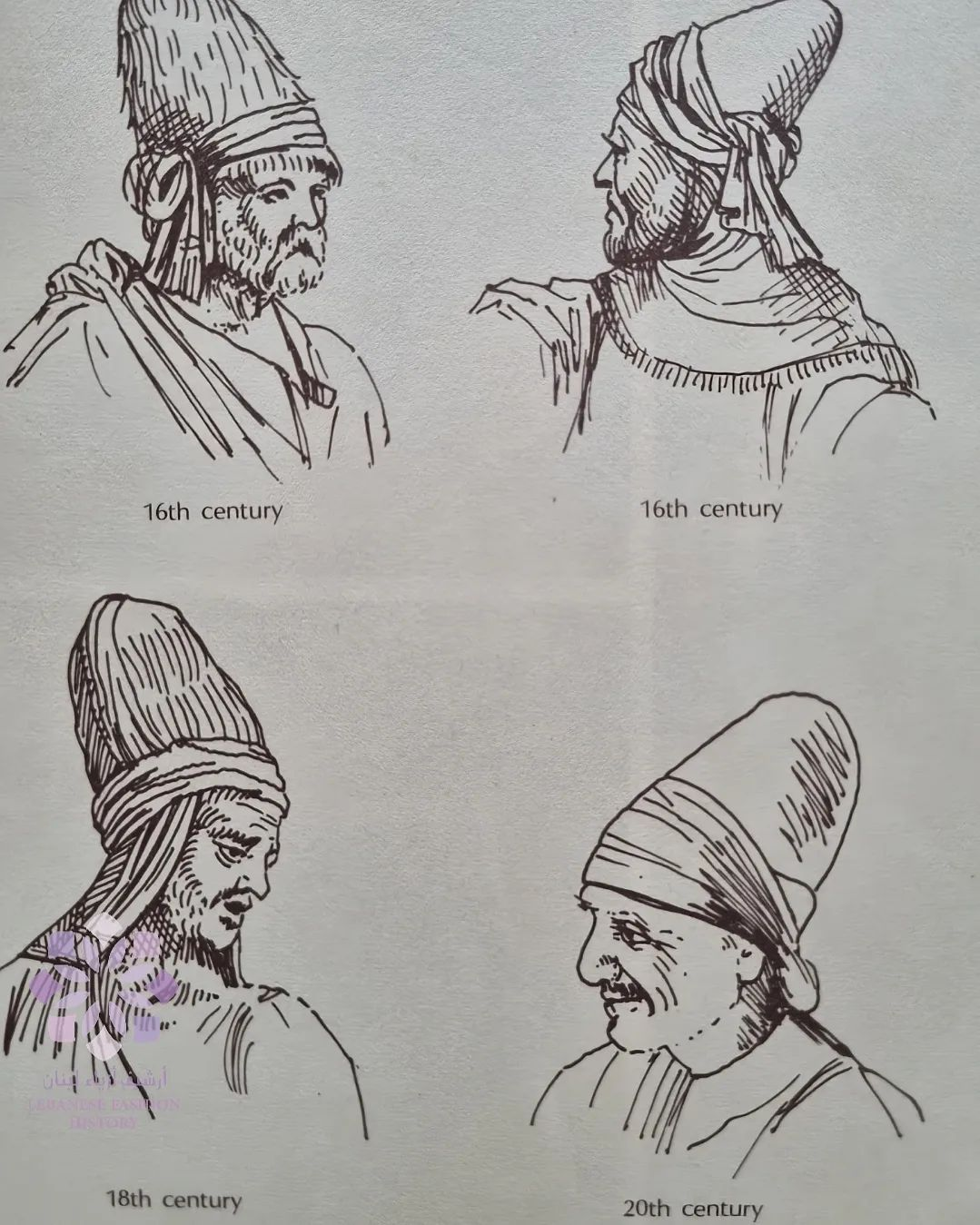
Evolution of the labbadeh throughout time

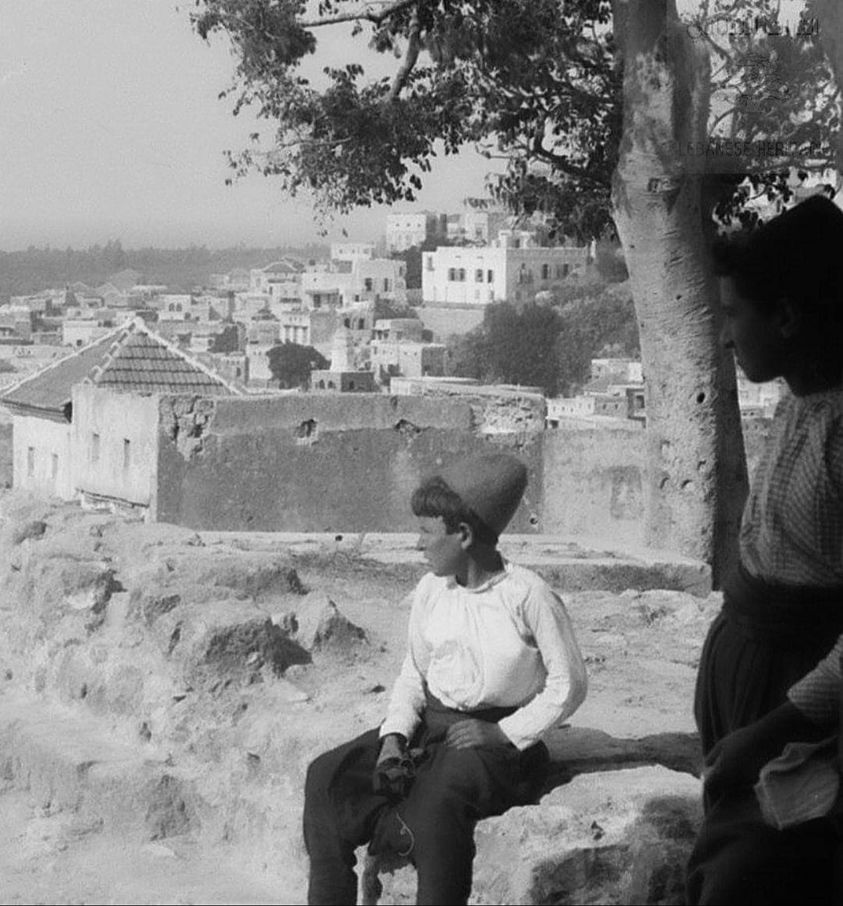
Two Lebanese village boys watching the sunrise. The boy sitting is wearing a labbadeh while the boy standing has on a tarboosh, c. 1920s

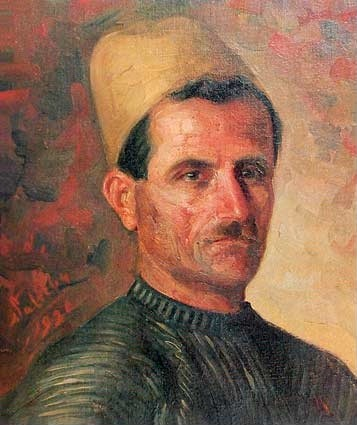
Peasant from Btalloun wearing typical mountain headdress. Oil on canvas by Khalil Saleeby, 1926

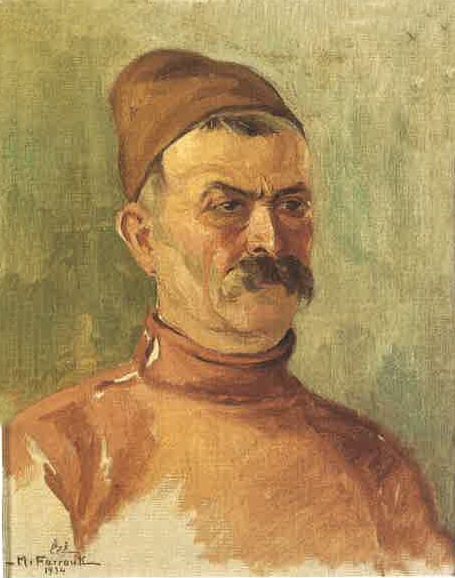
The Oil Seller. Oil on canvas by Moustafa Farroukh, 1934

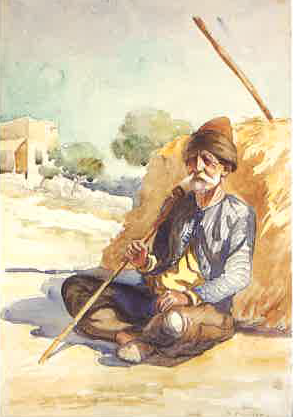
A Peasant from the Bekaa. Watercolor paint by Moustafa Farroukh, 1937

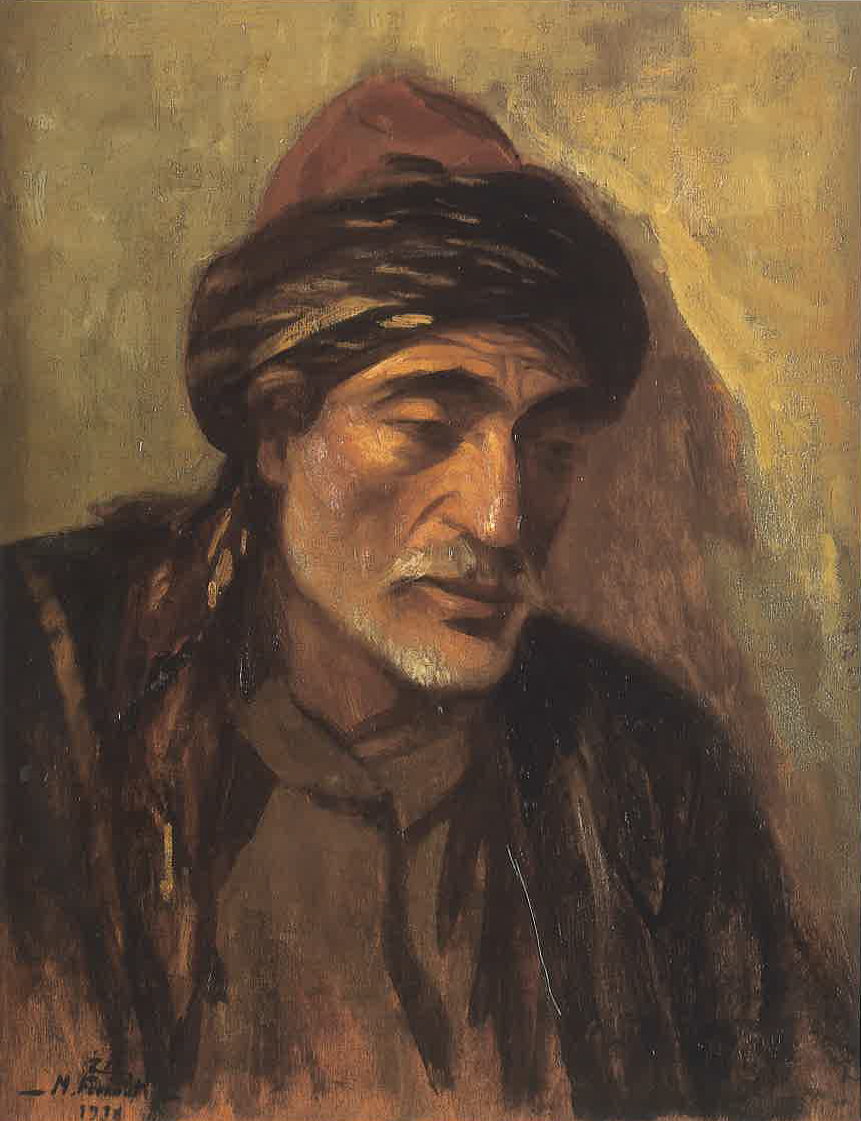
Portrait of a Lebanese villager. Oil on plywood by Moustafa Farroukh, 1939

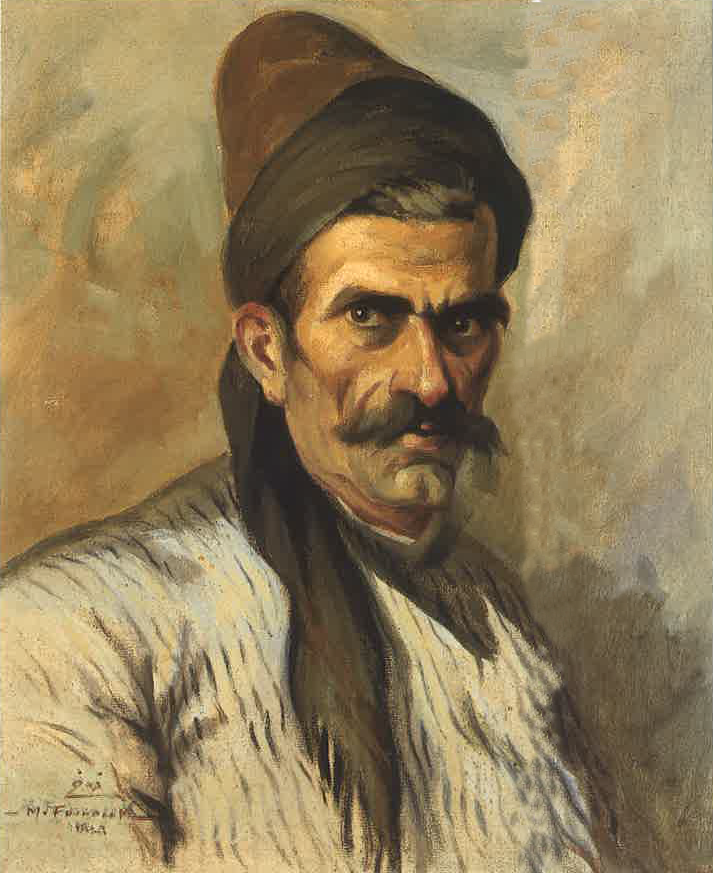
Portrait of a muleteer. Oil on canvas by Moustafa Farroukh, 1946

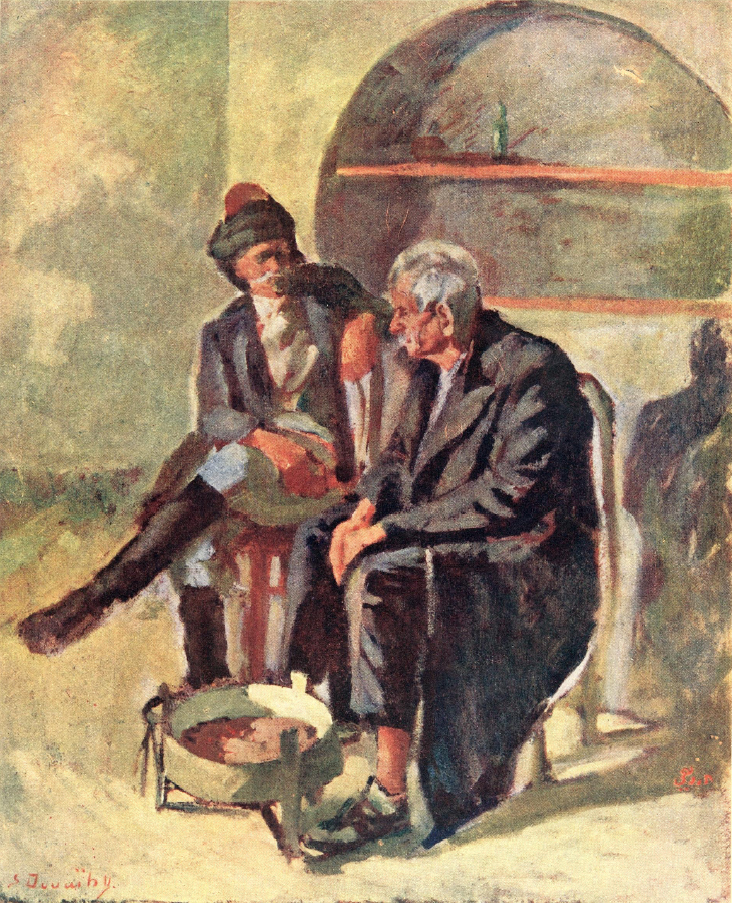
Conversation by Saliba Douaihy

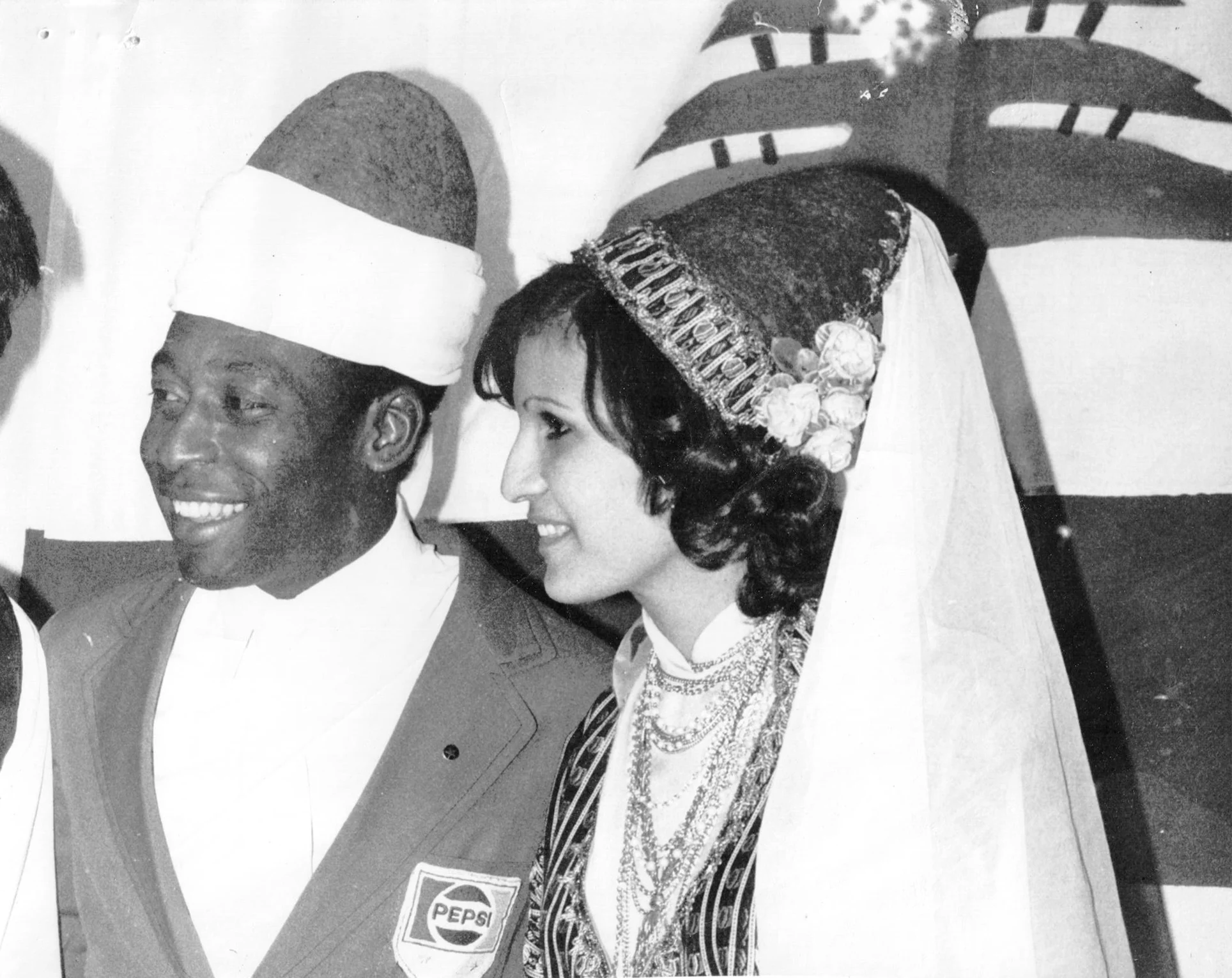
Brazilian football star Pelé wearing a labbadeh during a visit to Lebanon, 1975

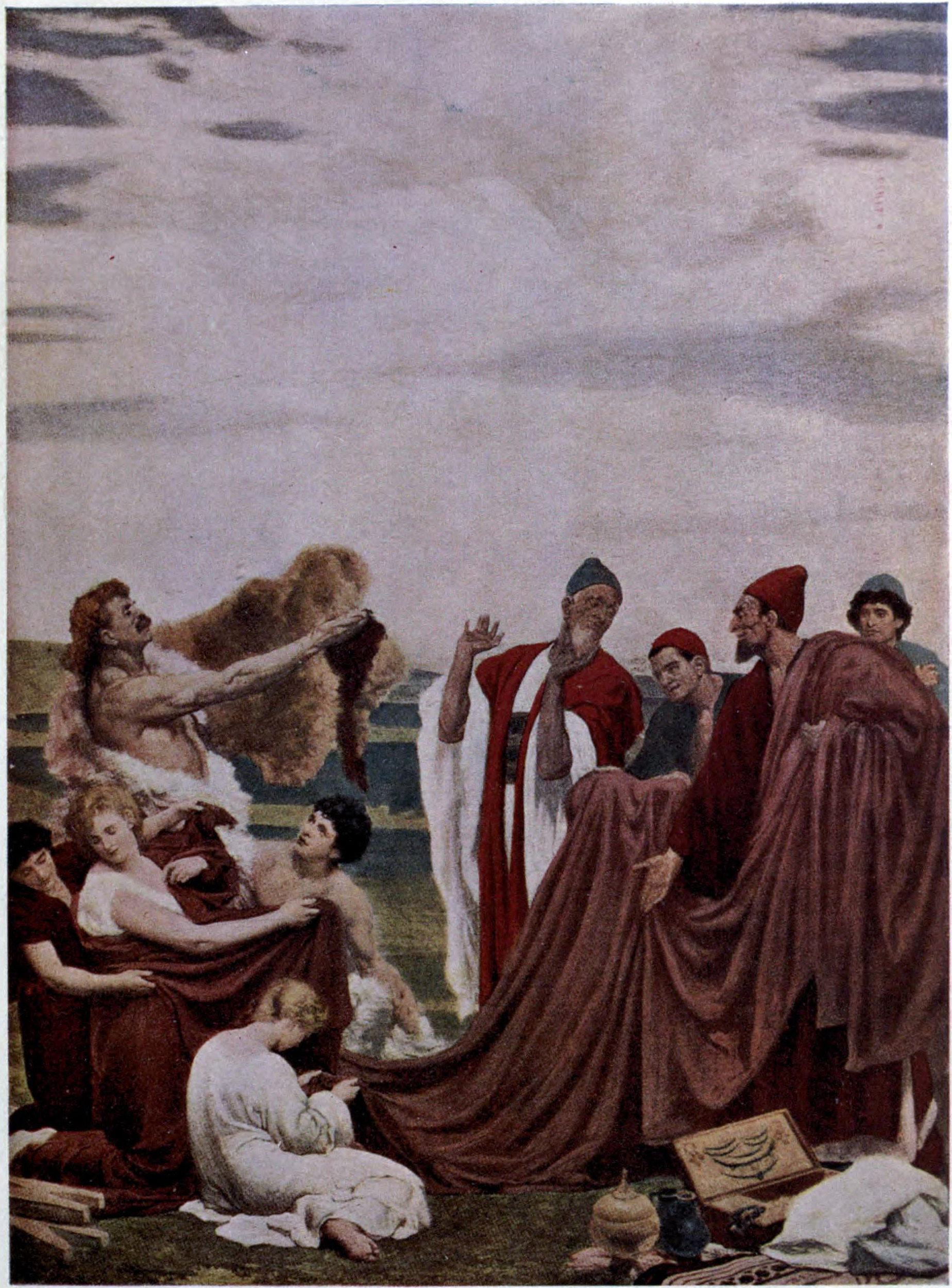
Phoenician traders on the coast of Britain by Frederic Leighton

== See also ==
- List of hat styles
- Baalbeck International Festival
- Tantour, traditional Lebanese women's headdress
