= Printer's hat =

Box-shaped folded paper hat

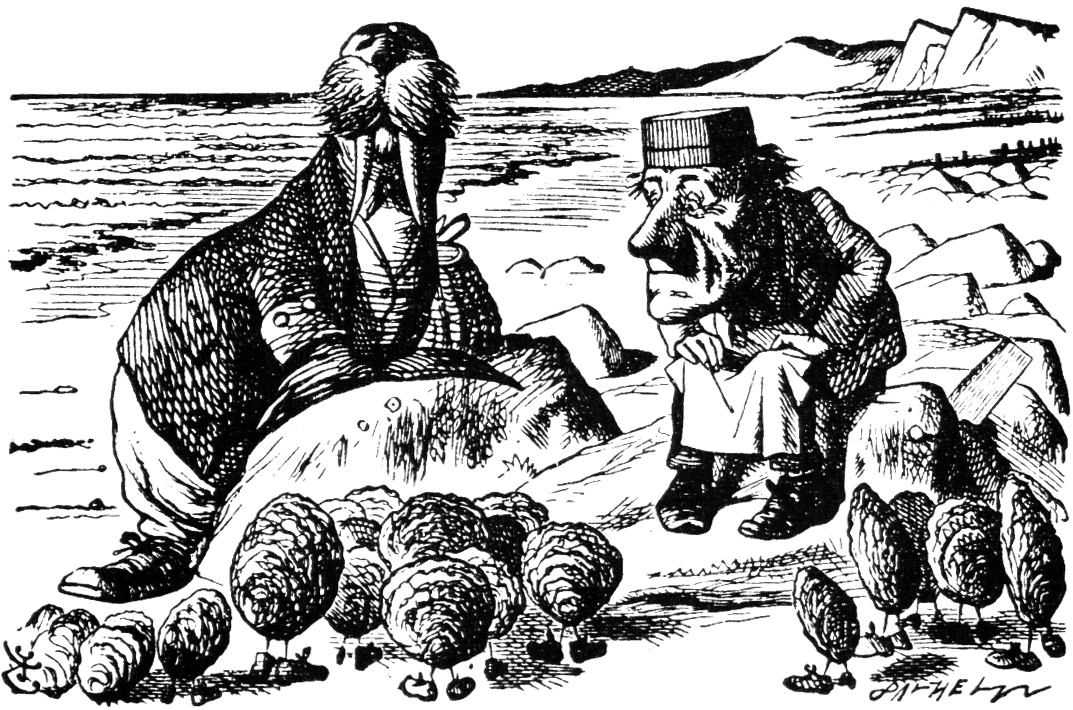
The Carpenter in Lewis Carroll's 1871 novel Through the Looking-Glass wears a printer's hat.

A printer's hat (also called a pressman's or carpenter's hat) is a traditional, box-shaped, folded paper hat, formerly worn by craft tradesmen such as carpenters, masons, painters, printers, and those who work around or erect printing presses. For printers, the cap served to keep ink from matting their hair. As for carpenters and painters, the hat was a cheap way to shield them from debris and splattering paint.

The folding process starts with a simple bicorne hat, then folds the two corners inward and the peak down to create a compact and stable box.

The hat has slowly gone out of use by printers due to the cleaner work environment surrounding newspaper production. Additionally, paper sizes of newspapers have decreased from 15 inches wide to 12 inches wide. This makes 2 sheets of newspaper required to create the printer's hat.

== See also ==
- List of hat styles
