= Chamanto =

Traditional decorative garment from Chile

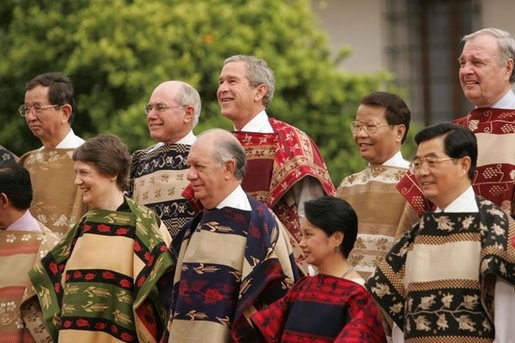
APEC leaders wearing chamantos during the 2004 summit

A chamanto (Mapudungun: chama, woolen fabric) is a traditional decorative garment from central Chile, similar to a poncho and woven in silk thread and wool. Its entire contour is finished with ribbon edging. Traditionally, Chilean festive ponchos incorporate colors such as grey, brown, red, black, and white. The difference between a chamanto and other ponchos is their reversibility, as both sides — one light, one dark — are fully finished. Traditionally, the dark side of the poncho is used during the day, while its light side is mostly worn at night.

The chamantos gained world attention when they were worn by the 21 leaders of the Asia Pacific Economic Cooperation during the 2004 summit's official photo.

The making of a chamanto demands great diligence, because of the exquisiteness involved in the weaving of the silk and wool, plus the intricacy of the design sketched by crossing the threads.

The figures embellishing the chamantos include copihues, Chile's national flower, barley and wheat ears, blackberries, bunches of grape, fuchsias, pansies and various birds representative of the national fauna.

== See also ==
- Culture of Chile

== Sources ==
- Jill Condra (9 April 2013). Encyclopedia of National Dress: Traditional Clothing Around the World. ABC-CLIO. p. 136. ISBN 978-0-313-37637-5.
