= Serape effect =

The serape effect is a rotational trunk movement that increases the power output of the human body. It is trained in sports that involve rotation of the torso, such as boxing and discus throwing. The muscles involved in the serape effect are stretched and then snap-back with increased strength. It is named after a piece of clothing called the serape.

== History ==
The term serape originates from a piece of clothing worn by people of Latin-American countries, specifically Mexico, also known by the same name. A serape is a brightly colored blanket which hangs around the shoulders and crosses diagonally across the anterior portion of the trunk. The general direction of how a serape is worn is similar to the direction of the pull of four muscles in the same area. The serape effect is this group of four muscles working together to produce an opposition of the rib cage and pelvis in the wind-up of a motion, and finally, generate a large summation of internal forces from the snap-back. The serape effect is prevalent in ballistic motions like throwing, kicking, and swinging.

== Muscles involved ==
The rhomboids, serratus anterior, external obliques, and internal obliques are involved in the serape effect.

== Sport significance ==
The serape effect is important in throwing motions and motions that involve the rotation of the torso that have a high velocity (Northrip, Logan, McKinney, 1974). This includes ballistic motions such as with throwing a discus or javelin. The transverse rotation of the pelvic girdle prior to a ballistic throwing motion is important for creating a higher velocity in the direction of the motion. Without this pelvic girdle rotation prior to the ballistic movement then the pelvis will recoil and there will not be as a great of a velocity to the upper body during the ballistic motion because of a lack of stretching of the muscles and a lack of energy built up to contribute to the movement. The rotational movement of this larger body segment, the trunk, enables a summation of internal forces that is able to be transferred from this large area to a smaller area as such as the arm and the hand for throwing an object. The serape effect can also be applied to kicking by transferring these forces from the trunk and pelvis to the lower legs. For a throwing motion when the throwing limb is diagonally abducted and laterally rotated then the rib cage and pelvis should be at their farthest distance apart, which allows for a maximal amount of stretch in the muscles involved in the serape effect. This maximum point of stretching of the muscles lengthens the muscles so that when the throw takes place the muscles create a maximum amount of force as they shorten back to a resting length. “Muscles must be placed on their longest length in order to exert their greatest force”.
