= Chilote cap =

Coarse raw wool woven cap

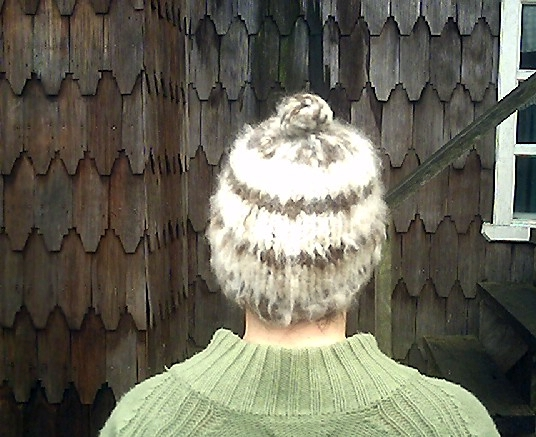
Picture of a common design of Chilote caps

A Chilote cap (Spanish: gorro chilote) is a knitted cap typical of Chiloé Archipelago.

== Overview ==
The caps are made of coarse raw wool and usually have a pom-pon (Chilote Spanish bellota, "acorn") at the top. The designs and colours of the cap may vary but are usually naturally coloured horizontal stripes over the natural garn.

== Popularity ==
While the cap is associated with Chilé, where many Chilote caps sold in the market are woven, it is popular all over Chile, especially among field labourers such as fishermen, farmers and forestry workers.

== See also ==
- List of hat styles
