= Chilote poncho =

Type of woolen poncho

A Poncho chilote is type of woolen poncho originating from southern Chile and usually associated with Chiloé Archipelago. The Poncho chilote is of simple design; most often it features stripes of white (uncoloured), grey and brown colours. The wool used is of medium to coarse yarn of raw wool. In early colonial and pre-Hispanic times the wool of chilihueques was used instead to that of sheep. While more heavy than ponchos used in central Chile and the Pampas the Poncho chilote is warmer and maintains its warmth even if it gets wet.

According to the 18th-century navigator Alessandro Malaspina, in Chiloé an ordinary poncho took two months to manufacture, while a super-fine-quality poncho took six or twelve months to finish.
