= Serape =

Blanket-like shawl or cloak worn in Mexico, especially by men

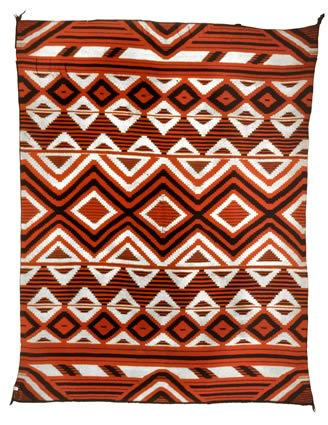
A Navajo serape from the mid-19th century.

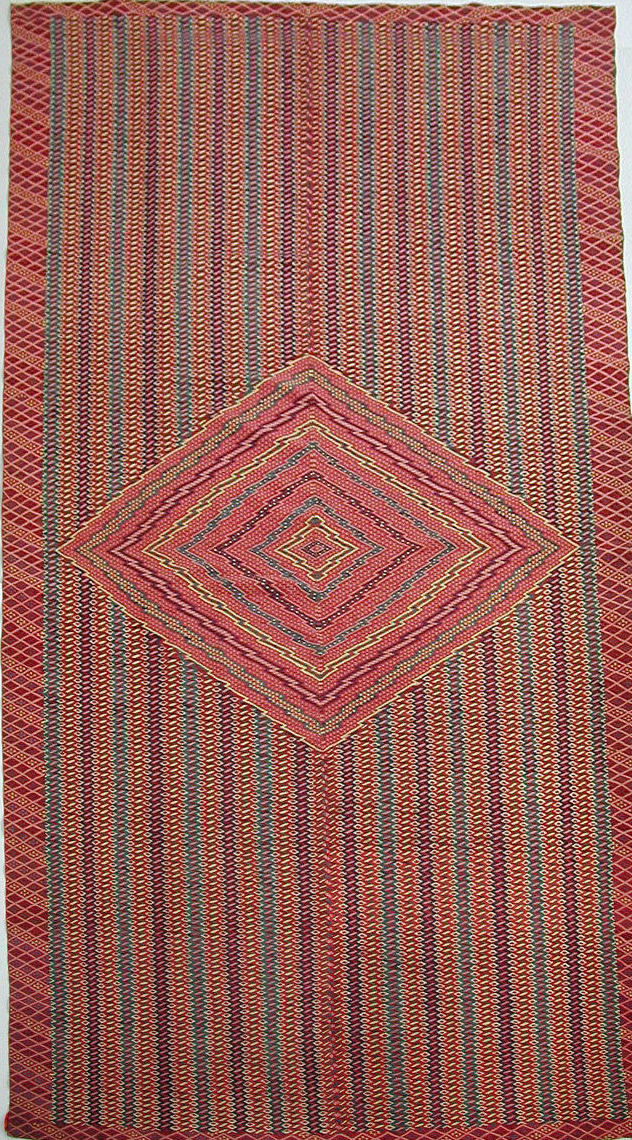
Classic Saltillo Serape, circa 1825

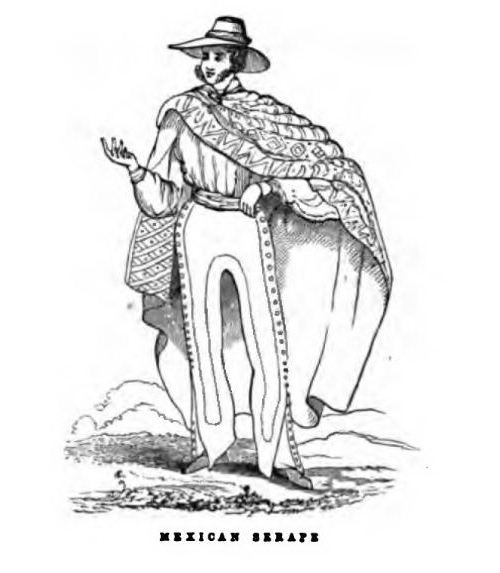
Traditional serapes are worn like a shawl or cloak. Its alteration into a poncho-like clothing item is more recent.

The serape, sarape or jorongo is a long blanket-like shawl or cloak, often brightly colored and fringed at the ends, worn in Mexico, especially by men. The accepted spelling of the word in Mexico and Spanish-speaking countries is sarape (or, less commonly, zarape). The term serape is for the rectangular woven blanket (no openings), though in more recent years it can also be used to refer to a very soft rectangular blanket with an opening in the middle for one's head, similar to a poncho, called gabán, or jorongo in Mexico. Modern variations of some serapes are made with matching hoods for head covering. The length varies, but front and back normally reach knee length on an average person.

Available in various colors and design patterns, the typical colors of serapes from the highland regions are two-tone combinations of black, grey, brown, or tan depending on the natural color of the sheep flocks grown in the area, with large design patterns utilizing traditional indigenous motifs. The ends are usually fringed.

== History ==
The serape is thought to have its forebears in garments worn in the region near Chiautempan and Contla, Tlaxcala. Around 1591, a diaspora from Tlaxcala accompanied Spanish conquistadores North to pacify La Gran Chichimeca. They eventually settled near Saltillo in the barrio of San Esteban de la Nueva Tlaxcala, where they began agricultural development, including the raising of sheep and goats. There are records of two master weavers being sent from Tlaxcala to Saltillo in 1650.

One of the first documented instances of the word zarape, can be found in the diaries of fray Juan Augustin de Morfi, from his visit in 1777 to a property owned by descendants of conquistador, Francisco de Urdiñola.

During the Colonial period, it was taken to northern New Spain where it was adapted to the climate and the motifs changed. Designs and motifs changed during the reign of Maximilian I, where French and European patterns containing flowers, animals, and classic architecture were combined with traditional patterns. This specific style of sarapes were called Maximilians In the mid 1850s, sarapes began being made with machine-woven yarn and synthetic dyes.

The city of Teocaltiche, Jalisco is strongly linked to the development of the serape, although it was widespread throughout the area then known as Nueva Vizcaya.

== Guatemalan serape ==
The serape is not a typical garment for the Maya highland people, who wear different clothing in cold regions. The Guatemalan serape is an imitation of the Mexican serape with a Maya twist, and their production is intended for sales to foreigners or city dwellers who feel attracted to the garment. These serapes are sold through a broker, with the Mayan families, who depend mostly upon agricultural work, manufacturing small quantities for extra income. The brokers display the serapes at an incremental price at local markets or the sides of highland roads in improvised huts. The brokers are typically Maya. The appeal of the serape may be that they are made by Maya women on their traditional home looms, giving the serape a handmade look.

== Modern day ==
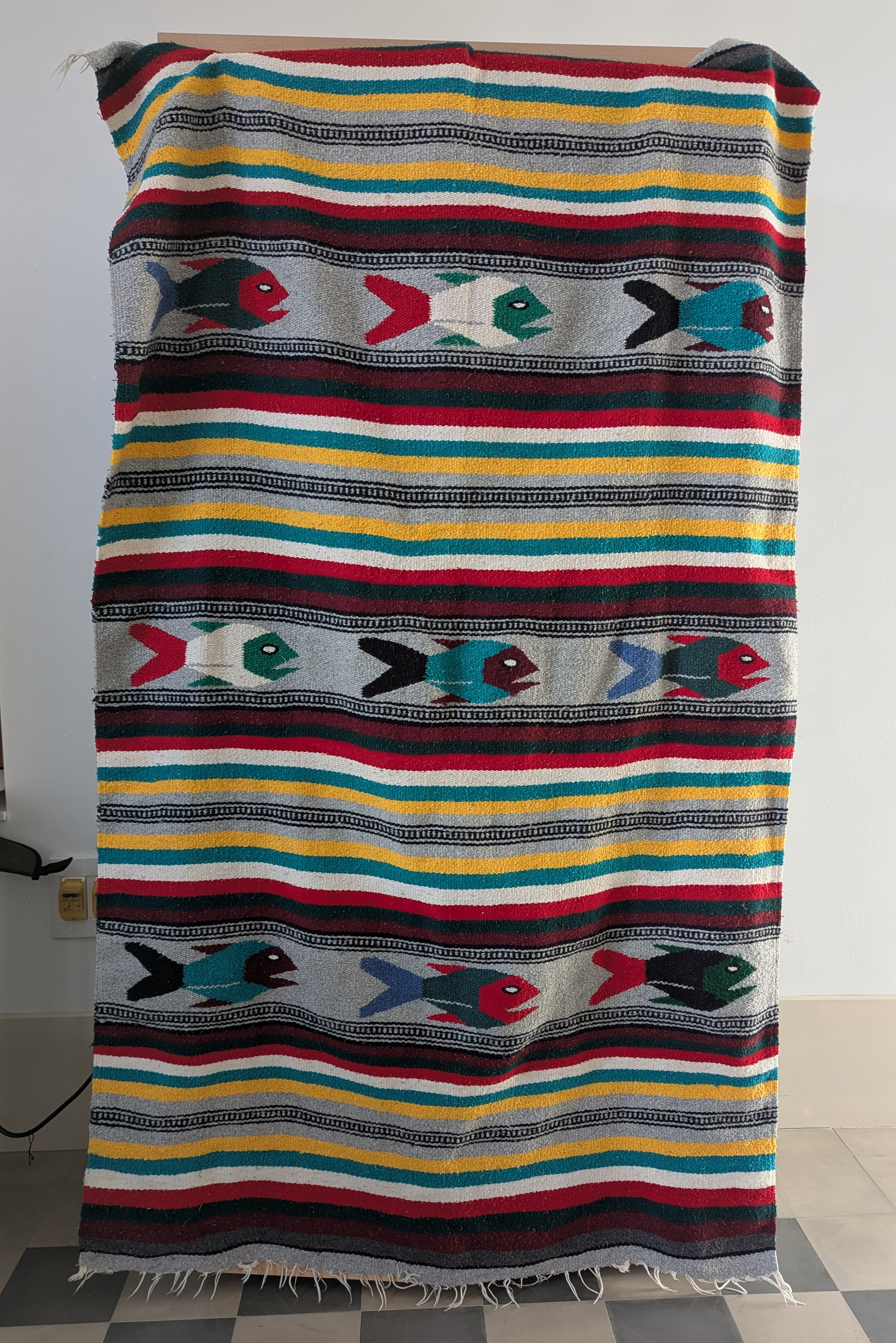
Modern mexican sarape.

The serape has seen a resurgence in popularity in the 2000s. Boutiques have added them to their inventory as companies produce new modern designs but with traditional methods.

Weavers in Saltillo have defended the tradition of sarape production and have criticized foreign designers for appropriating traditional designs.

In 2019, Venezuelan-American Carolina Herrera was criticized for using the traditional designs as part of her firm's Resort Collection. The Mexican minister of culture wrote a public letter asking the design house to clarify how the firm received permission to commercialize patterns associated with specific communities.. In 2025, the Ministry of Culture reiterated their position that firms that profit from traditional clothing must compensate the artisans that preserved the techniques and designs of sarapes. The Mexican Institute of Industrial Property (IMPI), which registers intellectual property, has an entry for Sarape fino de Saltillo (Fine Saltillo sarape), which would protect the artisans, according to the Coahuilan cultural activist, Jesus Gerardo Segura Medina.

== See also ==
- Huipil
- Poncho
- Rebozo
- Textiles of Mexico
- Tilmàtli
- Serape effect
