= Poncho =

Cape- or blanket-like outer garment

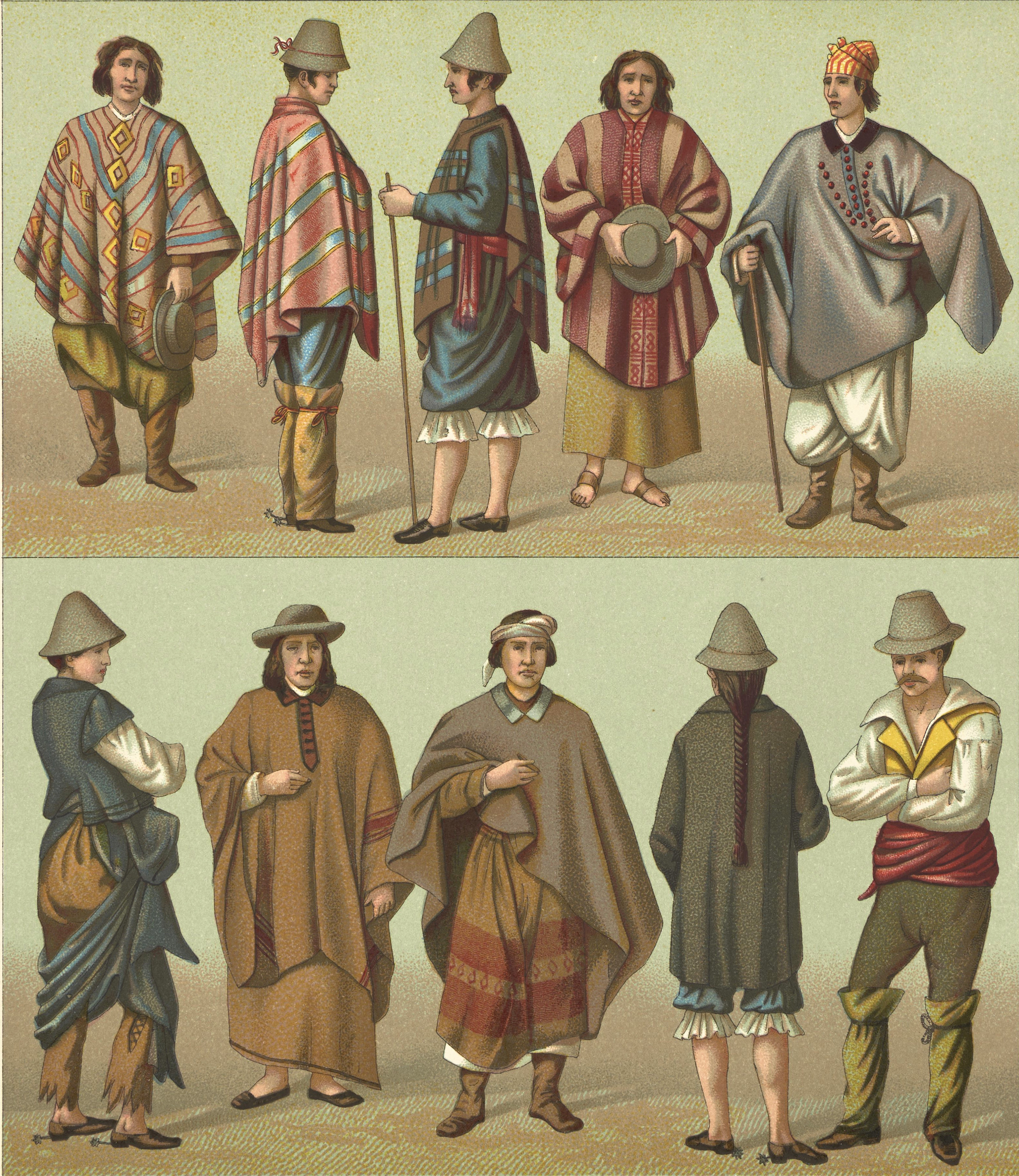
Araucanos and Huasos in Chile, 19th century

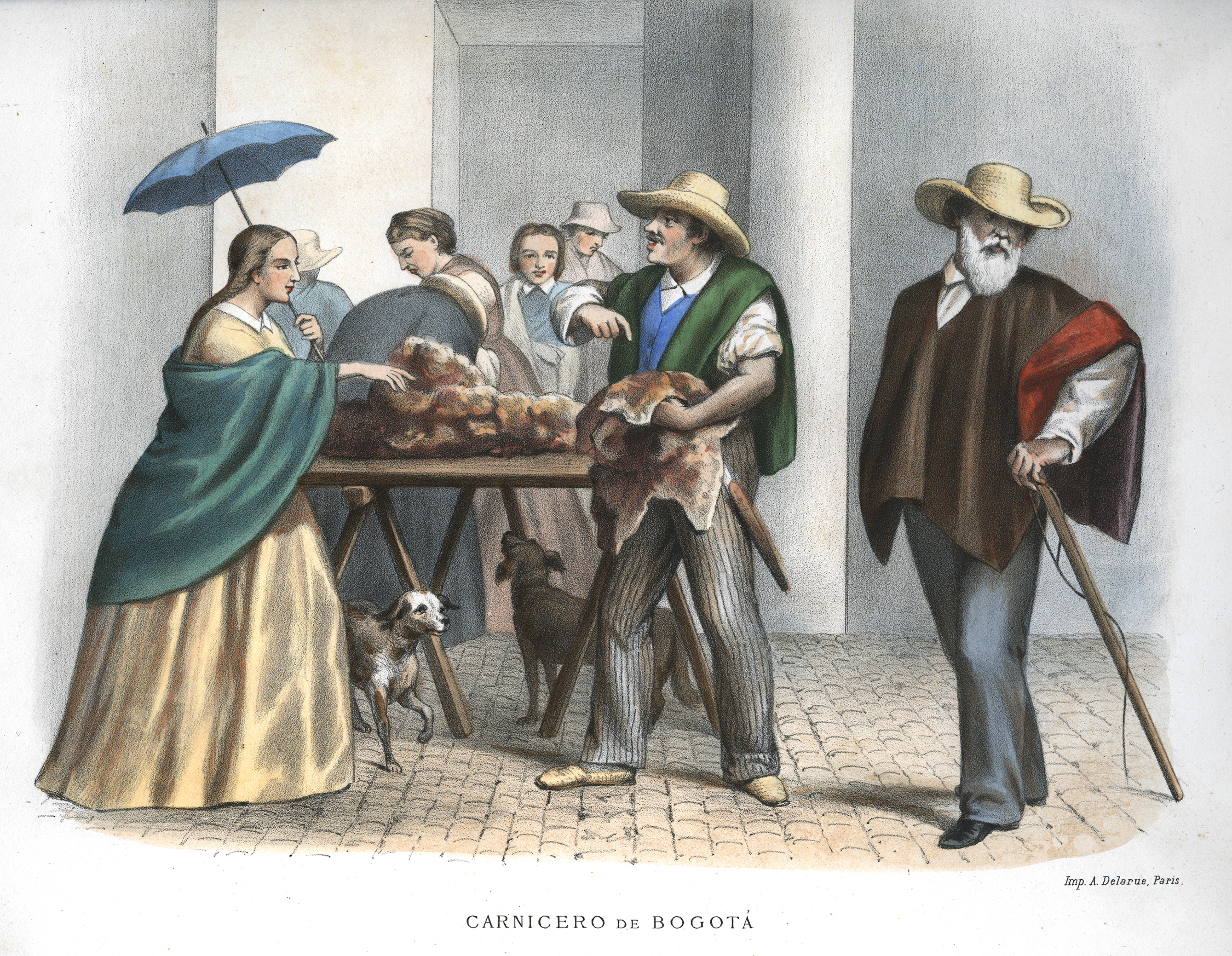
A market scene, Ruana in Bogotá, circa 1860

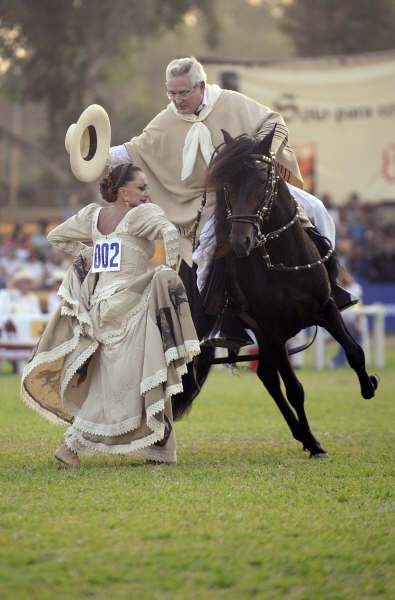
A Peruvian chalán dancing marinera on a Peruvian Paso horse

A poncho (Spanish pronunciation: [ˈpontʃo]; Quechua: punchu; Mapudungun: pontro; "blanket", "woolen fabric") is a kind of plainly formed, loose outer garment originating in the Americas, traditionally and still usually made of fabric, and designed to keep the body warm. Ponchos have been used by the Native American peoples of the Andes, Greater Nicoya, Patagonia, and the Valley of Mexico since pre-Hispanic times, in places now under the territory of Argentina, Bolivia, Brazil, Chile, Colombia, Costa Rica, Ecuador, Mexico, Nicaragua, Peru, Uruguay, and Venezuela, and have also become familiar in parts of the U.S. A rain poncho is made from a watertight material designed to keep the body dry from the rain.

== Types ==
In its simplest form, the poncho is essentially a single large sheet of fabric with an opening in the center for the head. It often has an extra piece of fabric serving as a hood. Rainproof ponchos are normally fitted with fasteners to close the sides once the poncho is draped over the body, with openings provided for the arms. Many ponchos have hoods attached to ward off wind and rain.

Alternative ponchos are now designed as fashion items. They are the same shape but of different material. They are designed to look fashionable and provide warmth and to remain breathable and comfortable, rather than to ward off wind and rain. They are often made out of woolen yarn, knitted or crocheted. Ponchos with festive designs or colors can be worn at special events as well.

=== Traditional ponchos ===
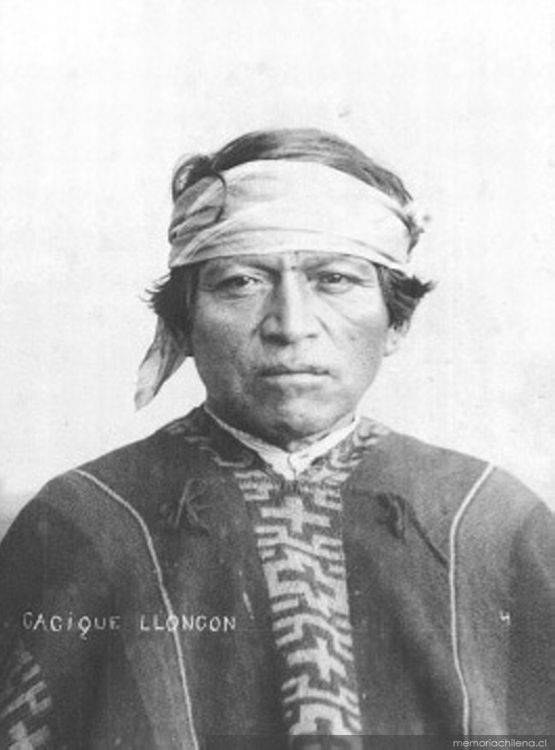
Mapuche cacique Lloncon wearing a poncho in 1890

The poncho was one of the typical clothes of many South American and Mexican cultures. Although investigations have concluded that its origins could be Mexico, Ecuador or Peru, it is not known where the first ponchos were made. The poncho is now commonly associated with the Americas. As traditional clothing, the local names and variants are:

- Ruana, in cold regions of Colombia and Venezuela.
- Poncho, most Spanish-speaking countries and worldwide.
- In Brazil, the use of ponchos has been reported since the 16th century, starting in São Paulo; in the 19th century, it was a typical garment of the Caipira people, as reported by Saint-Hilaire. In addition to poncho, it can also be called pala, bernéu, and specifically in the Caipira dialect, ponche.
- Chamanto, only in Central Chile, poncho in the north and south.
- Jorongo, usually larger or full-length, and often used for special occasions or horse-back riding in Mexico
- Gabán, typical in Michoacán, Mexico.
- Quechquémitl in many Mexican regions
- Poncho chilote, a heavy woolen poncho of Chiloé Archipelago.
- In Argentina, every province has a traditional design of poncho (material, color and design), being the most famous the "Poncho salteño" of the Salta province which is even included as a part of the province's flag.

=== Military ponchos ===
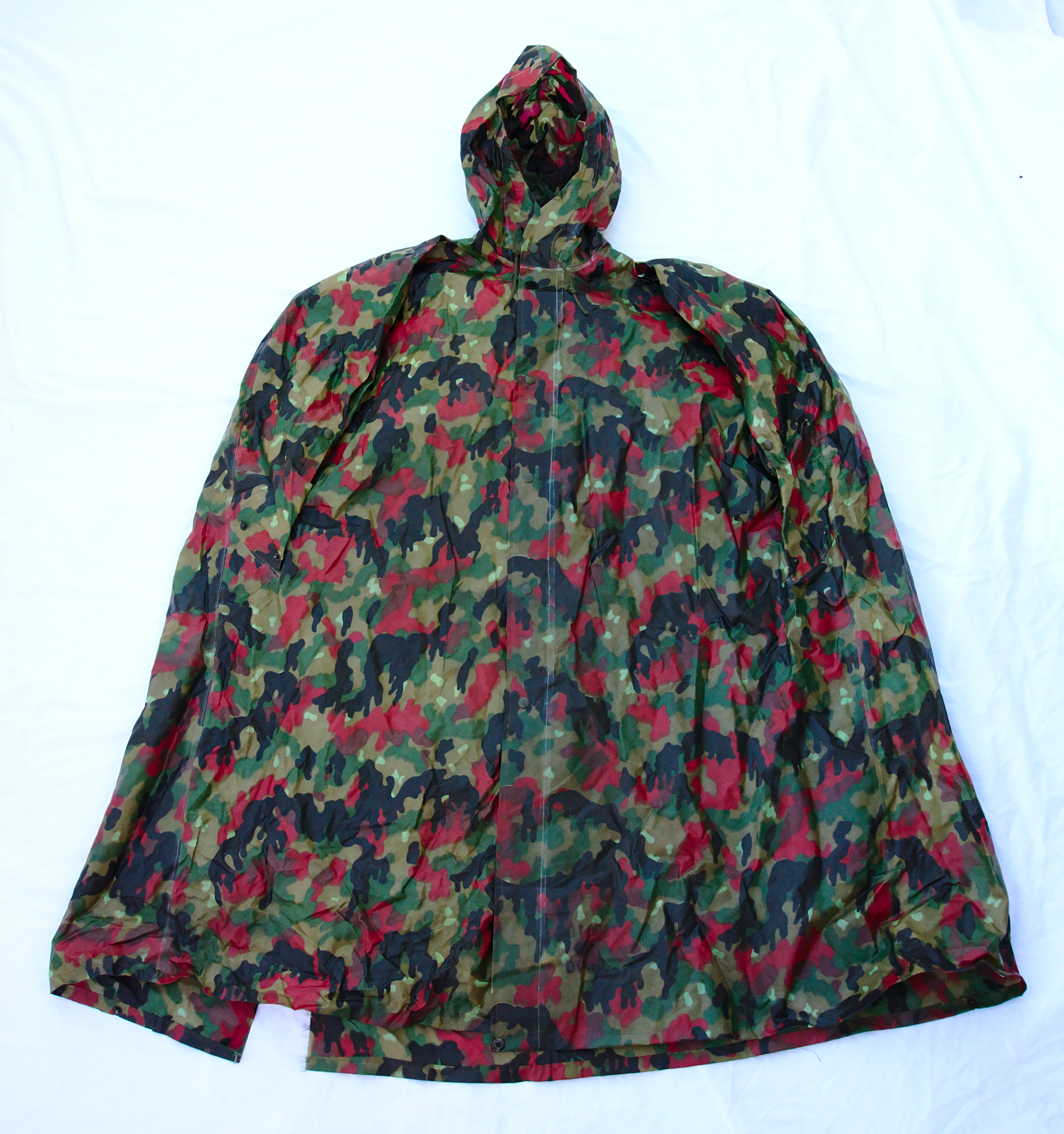
Swiss Alpenflage poncho

The poncho was first used on a regular basis in the 1850s for irregular U.S. military forces operating on the U.S. Western Plains. These early military ponchos were made of gutta percha muslin, a latex-coated, waterproof cloth. Ponchos made of gutta-percha or India rubber coated cloth were officially adopted during the American Civil War, both as rain clothing and as a ground sheet for sleeping. While originally intended for cavalry forces, they were widely used by infantry as well; Major General Sherman's Union troops, lightly equipped and living off procurement demand from the local populace, wore ponchos during wet weather encountered during the march through Confederate Georgia to the sea.

The U.S. Army again issued ponchos of waterproof rubberized canvas to its forces during the Spanish–American War of 1898. Two years later, both the Army and the Marines were forced to issue waterproof rubberized cloth ponchos with high neck collars during the Philippine–American War in 1900. With the entry of the United States into World War I, both doughboys and Marines in France wore the poncho; it was preferred over the raincoat for its ability to keep both the wearer and his pack dry, as well as serving as a roof for a makeshift shelter.

Just prior to World War II, ponchos were significantly improved during testing with the U.S. Army Jungle Experimental Platoon in the jungles of Panama, incorporating new, lighter materials and a drawcord hood that could be closed off to form a rain fly or ground sheet. Ponchos were widely used by United States armed forces during World War II; even lightly equipped foot-mounted forces such as Merrill's Marauders, forced to discard tentage and all other unnecessary equipment, retained their blanket and poncho. During the 1950s, new lightweight coated nylon and other synthetic materials were developed for military ponchos. The poncho has remained in service ever since as a standard piece of U.S. military field equipment. Today, the United States armed forces issue ponchos that may be used as a field expedient shelter. These garments are also used by hunters, campers, and rescue workers.

During World War II, the German Army (Wehrmacht) issued the Zeltbahn (see Shelter half), a poncho that could be combined to form tents. A typical four-man tent used four Zeltbahnen.

Hikers and soldiers may use military ponchos for improvised tents, sleeping mats, and other purposes besides clothing. Soldiers tend to use ponchos as a substitute for a tent because it is portable and easy to install. Poncho Hooch, Poncho Lean-to, Poncho Litter, and "Australian" Poncho Raft are examples of possible poncho configuration.

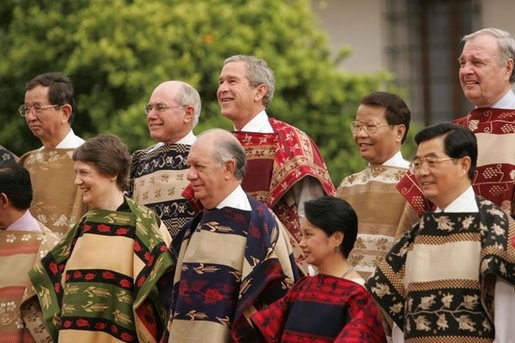
APEC leaders wearing chamantos during the 2004 summit

== Ponchos in Chile ==
In the late 18th century, Basque navigator José de Moraleda wrote that the ponchos of the Huilliche of Osorno were less colorful than those of Chiloé Archipelago. The Huilliche are the principal indigenous population of Chile from Toltén River to Chiloé Archipelago. Mapuche ponchos were once highly valued; in the 19th century a poncho could be traded for several horses or up to seventy kilos of yerba mate. 19th-century Mapuche ponchos were clearly superior to non-indigenous Chilean textiles and of good quality when compared to contemporary European wool textiles.

== Film ==
- Clint Eastwood famously wore a poncho as the lead character in each of the films he starred in for Sergio Leone (A Fistful of Dollars, For a Few Dollars More and The Good, the Bad and the Ugly). This gave him a distinct look in comparison to other cowboy characters in Western films, who usually wore dusters. It also inspired one worn by the Cybertronian bounty-hunter Lockdown on Transformers: Animated, one worn by the Spirit of the West on Rango, and one by Wildwheel on Transformers: Cyberverse.
- Sylvester Stallone improvised an ad-hoc poncho from discarded industrial grade canvas as John Rambo on the set of the 1982 movie First Blood. Behind the scenes when filming, Stallone found the leftover canvas underneath an abandoned truck and used his signature survival knife to make a hole in the top fold and turned it into the poncho worn by the Rambo character and describes it having saved him from the freezing cold bitter rain of Northern Canada.

== See also ==
- Aguayo, a typical Andean piece of cloth.
- Baja Jacket
- Bisht
- Belted plaid, a garment that could also double as a blanket or groundsheet.
- Cape
- Chasuble, a poncho-like Christian liturgical vestment.
- Cloak
- Kaftan
- Ruana
- Rebozo, a longer scarf like shawl without hole, tied around shoulder and can be used to carry a baby.
- Sarape, a poncho-like garment traditional to the Mexican state of Coahuila.
