= 1940s in Western fashion =

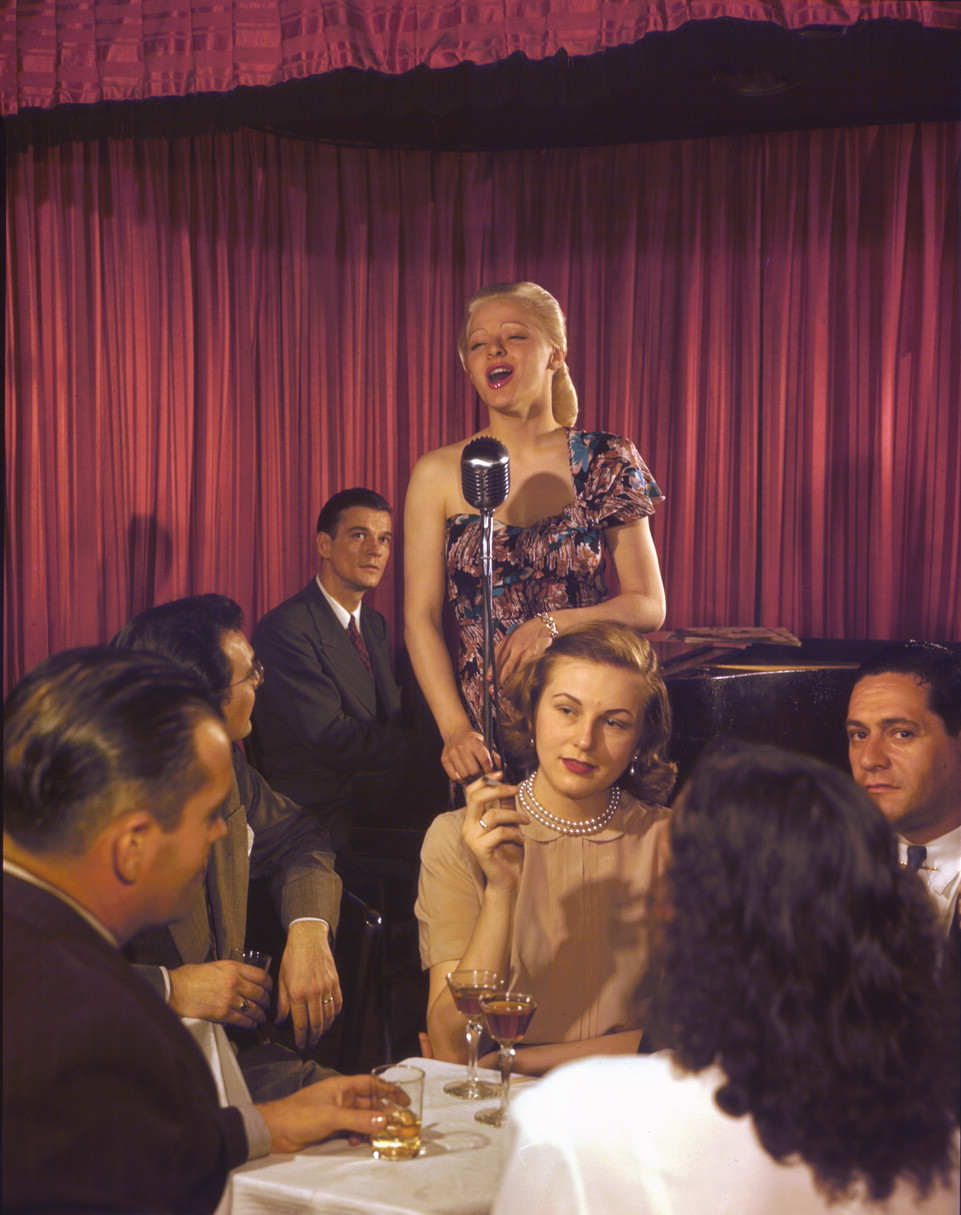
A club scene in New York City photographed by William P. Gottlieb, c. 1948.

The 1940s in Western fashion were profoundly shaped by World War II (1939–1945), dividing the decade into two distinct phases: a wartime first half defined by scarce resources and minimal change in styles, and a post-war second half marked by a cautious revival, though the war's shadow lingered throughout into the 1950s. Most studies of 1940s fashion have mainly focused on the post-war years, sidelining wartime trends and reducing them to simple, practical designs like slacks, while overlooking diverse national experiences. This reluctance partly arises from viewing fashion as trivial amid the war's immense toll, yet it played a vital role—bolstering economies, aiding the war effort with uniforms, and providing civilians, especially women, a mental escape. Defining "fashion" during this era is complex, as wartime limits—shortages, rationing, and a reduced workforce—stifled rapid style shifts, favoring function over flair. Still, as fashion historians Emmanuelle Dirix and Charlotte Fiell pointed out: "However because the cycle slowed down and changes were often to be found only in the detail rather than the silhouette, doesn't mean that we cannot speak of fashion. Clothing may have become more functional but its decorative qualities were far from lost and even though it became understated and functional, it was still closely linked to the expression of personal and social identity."

By 1940, France had already solidified its reputation as the epicenter of women's fashion design. Yet, within the first six months of 1940, German forces seized Paris, initiating an occupation that persisted until late 1944. With many couturiers fleeing and France isolated from the United States and the United Kingdom, French fashion became an internal affair, evolving in stark contrast to global trends. Beyond France, wartime fashion was shaped by rationing, giving rise to utility clothing and uniforms as the prevailing styles. The womenswear aesthetic of this era was understated yet elegant compared to the elaborate glamour of the late 1930s, defined by clean proportions and lines—featuring square, padded shoulders, a belted or tailored waist, and hemlines grazing just below the knee, giving women an overall structured, "mannish" feel. Tweeds and plaids, already popular in the 1930s, remained staples in utility wear, while vibrant colors and bold patterns injected life into these otherwise pragmatic garments. In the United States, rationing was less stringent than in the United Kingdom, and with French designs absent from the scene, American ready-to-wear flourished, propelled by innovators like Norman Norell and Claire McCardell, marking a pivotal shift in the industry.

== Women's fashion ==
=== 1940–1945: Fashion during World War II ===
==== The wartime silhouette ====
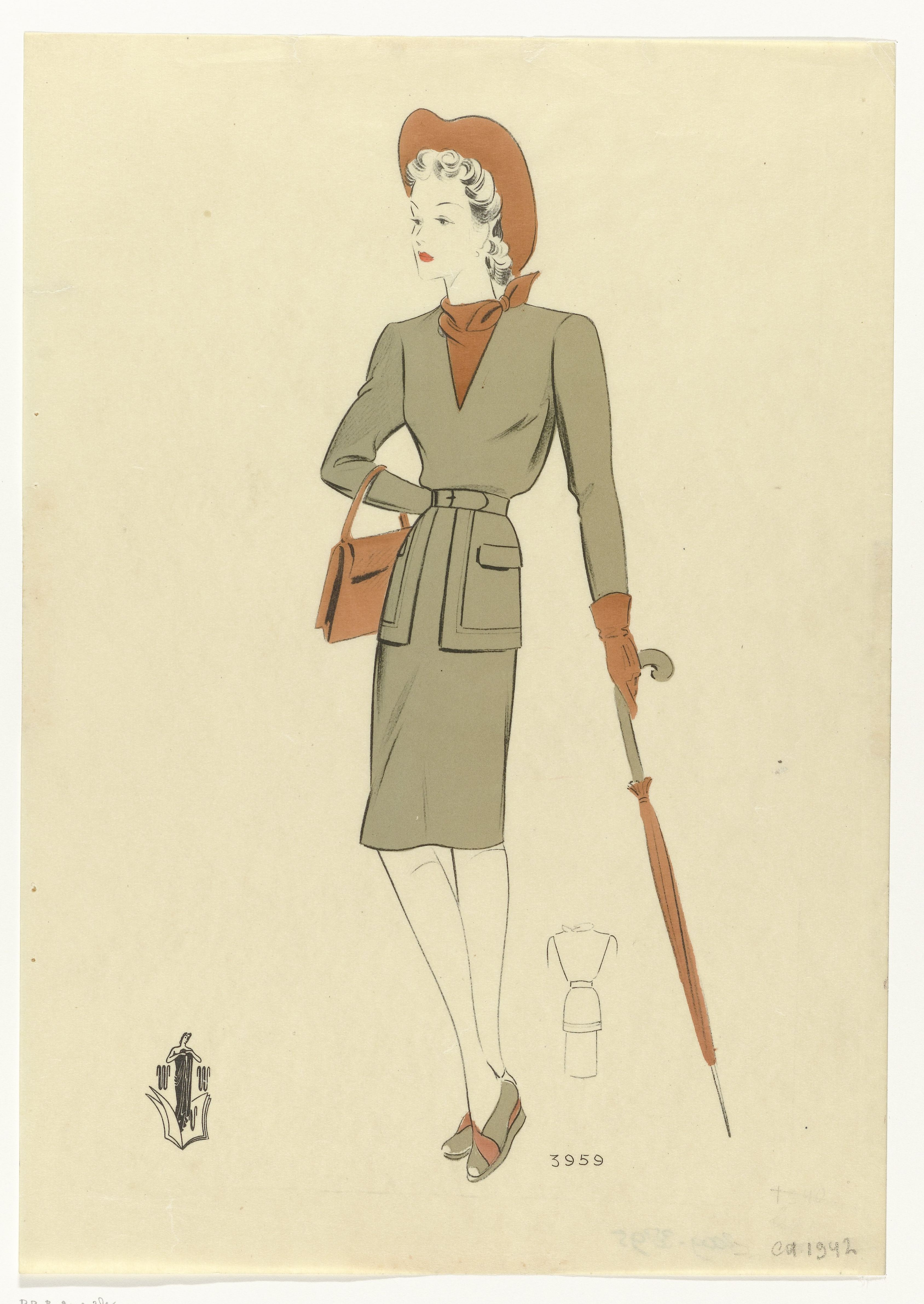
A Dutch fashion plate from c. 1942 showcasing the menswear-inspired skirt suit that became a staple of the 1940s.

Although the summer 1939 collections of Parisian haute couture were "some of the decade's most glamorous", with "puffed sleeves, bustled evening gowns, sweeping skirts and corseted waists", by 1940 there was a dramatic change towards a "much more practical, understated look". Following the onset of World War II, the luxurious bias-cut satins and chiffons of 1930s fashion were replaced by practical, resource-efficient clothing due to wartime demands for silk and artificial silk. The dominant silhouette of the early 1940s featured square, padded shoulders, a belted or tailored waist, and an overall mannish feel; where angular shoulders had been often whimsical in the 1930s, they became utilitarian and boxy in the new decade.

Woolen skirt suits became a staple, characterized by their menswear-inspired, sharp tailoring, slim silhouettes, and minimal waste. These suits featured narrow shoulders, slightly nipped waists, and military-inspired details like belts and breast pockets. The look became so ubiquitous that Vogue announced the "Tailored Suit" as the "Uniform of 1942" in its 15 January 1942 issue, describing it as a "suit to work in, serve in, live in, all through the busy daylight hours of your new double-duty life". Another iconic wartime style was the knee-length shirtwaist dress, with its contrasting collar and capped sleeves—offering a simple yet polished A-line skirt silhouette that was endorsed by American and British authorities as a wartime-appropriate look.

Practicality shaped fabric choices throughout the wartime period. Tweeds and plaid remained popular; dirndl-style dresses with gathered or pleated fullness offered a fuller silhouette; and separates—jackets paired with skirts—became increasingly common, giving multiple uses to individual pieces. Overt exoticism declined, with any reference to Japanese style avoided; instead, the public was encouraged to embrace styles from America's "friends"—China, South America, Mexico, and Greece—reflected in colorful dress prints featuring tropical motifs of llamas, palm trees, and bananas, dubbed "Good Neighbor" prints.

==== Germany and Italy ====
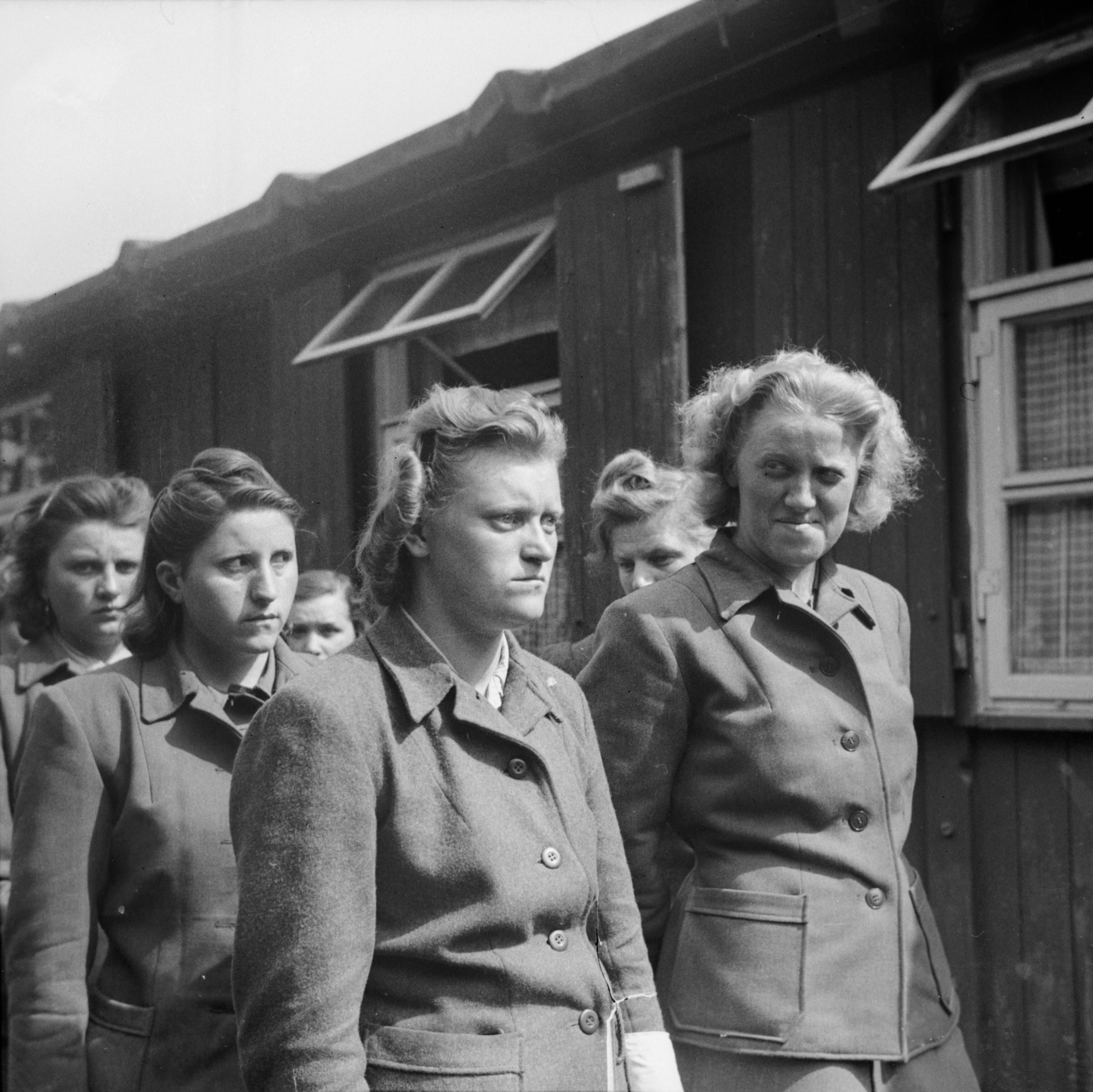
Female guards of the Bergen-Belsen concentration camp, 1945.

The Nazi regime had since the mid-1930s sought to forge a distinctly German approach to fashion as part of its broader cultural agenda. Hitler detested the influence of Paris in any sphere, declaring Parisian fashions part of an "International Jewish Conspiracy" and un-German; the regime even replaced French vocabulary, so that "haute couture" became "Hauptmode" and "chic" became "schick." The feminine ideal promoted by the party—dismissively dubbed "Gretchen" by opponents—was youthful, healthy, fit, and natural, rejecting the slender, languid silhouette promoted by Parisian couture in favor of what Nazi propaganda described as "large women with big hips, the perfect birth machines." Traditional regional dress, particularly the dirndl from Munich—the birthplace of the Nazi Party—was extensively promoted as the proper mode of dress. The German Fashion Institute was established to oversee German fashion, with Magda Goebbels, wife of the propaganda minister, appointed its first director; Goebbels herself, however, publicly declared misgivings about the Gretchen archetype the party was so eager to impose. The regime's ideological obsession with the dirndl was complicated by the garment's simultaneous popularity abroad: designers including Robert Piguet and Mainbocher showed dirndl-inspired creations in their Spring 1939 collections, and Marlene Dietrich—an outspoken opponent of Nazism—inadvertently fueled international enthusiasm for the style when she was outfitted in traditional Tracht by a New York shop in 1937.

By 1943, few fashion garments were being produced in Germany at all, yet magazines continued to publish features on fashions that were unavailable and in many cases imaginary. By 1944, conditions in some areas had become so extreme that safes opened by Allied troops were found to contain not money or jewelry, but clothing—indicating just how precious a commodity it had become.

Mussolini's Italy had similarly pursued a nationalist fashion agenda, replacing French terminology with Italian equivalents and urging consumers to purchase only Italian-made clothing. Material shortages—especially severe in the prestigious accessories market—forced designers such as Salvatore Ferragamo and Guccio Gucci to experiment with alternative materials including cork, plastics, and fabric. Despite these constraints, the three Fontana sisters—Zoe, Micol, and Giovanna—established their Roman fashion house in 1943, one of the most important Italian fashion enterprises to emerge from the period.

==== France under occupation ====
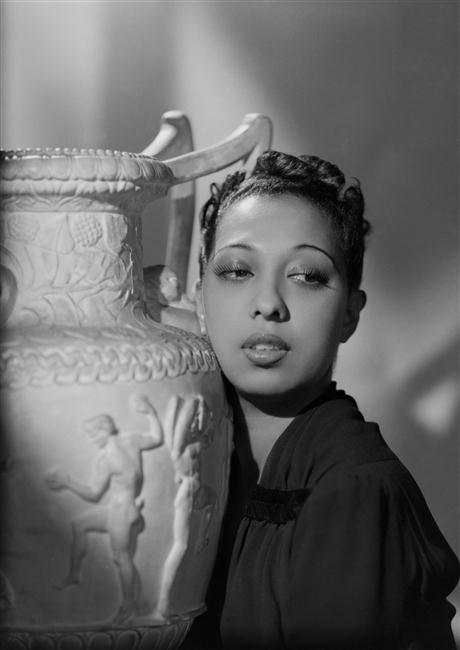
Josephine Baker photographed at Studio Harcourt, 1940.

World War II began within days of the 1939 Parisian Autumn Haute Couture collections, with Paris still the undisputed epicenter of international fashion. Couturiers responded immediately to the threat: at the Autumn 1939 collections, Piguet showed a reversible wool "air-raid" outfit whose cape doubled as a blanket; Schiaparelli featured a one-piece zippered jumpsuit in shocking pink; Molyneux showed chic pyjamas for home and bomb shelter use; and at Lanvin there were practical day dresses with large kangaroo pockets. Colors with a patriotic or military flavor appeared—"Aeroplane Grey" and "French Soil Beige"—alongside scarves printed with French regimental flags. As Harper's Bazaar summarized the mood: "The French have decreed that fashion shall go on (…) everyone makes an effort to be as elegant as possible." The spring 1940 collection became known as "La Collection des Permissionaires," named after the special permission granted to couturiers who had been called up for military service to return home and complete their silhouettes—a sign of how economically and culturally essential the couture trade was considered.

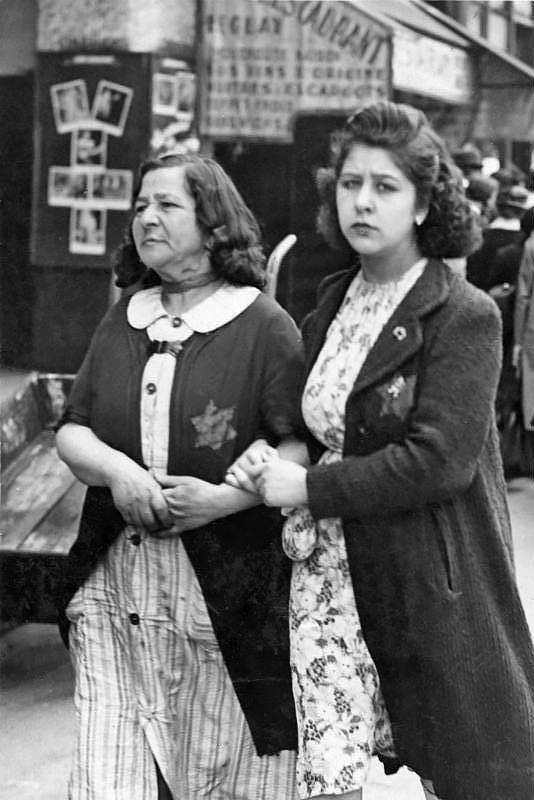
Parisian women wearing the Jewish badge during Nazi occupation, 1942.

On June 14, 1940, German troops entered Paris wearing uniforms designed by Hugo Boss. With France's borders closed, the rest of the world assumed the Paris fashion industry had come to a standstill; the last Parisian issue of international Vogue featured an editorial shoot of models sitting on packing crates at a railway station, waiting to leave. In reality, nearly 100 couture salons remained open throughout the occupation, though the period proved a constant struggle for survival. Lucien Lelong, president of the Chambre Syndicale de la Haute Couture, became the key figure in preserving the industry. When Hitler demanded that the entire couture enterprise be relocated to Berlin or Vienna, Lelong negotiated with German authorities to keep the houses in Paris, arguing that without the skilled seamstresses, pattern cutters, milliners, and embroiderers—workers with few transferable skills—couture would be impossible. He would attend fourteen meetings with Nazi officials over the course of the occupation; it was ultimately only the advance of Allied troops that saved the industry from total closure in 1944. Through his negotiations, Lelong ensured that only 3 per cent—rather than the 80 per cent initially demanded—of couture employees were redeployed to war industries, leaving 12,000 workers in the couture trade for the duration.

The occupation forced significant changes in clientele. International socialites who had previously constituted a third of Paris fashion's buyers could no longer visit; many wealthy Jewish couture patrons had fled the city. Two new and "problematic" groups took their place: the collaborating industrial elite, and the so-called BOFs (from Beurre, Oeufs, Fromage—butter, eggs and cheese), the black marketeers whose new-found wealth allowed them to purchase luxury goods while their fellow Frenchmen suffered. Christian Dior, then working as a designer at Lucien Lelong, later remarked that after the war this new vulgar clientele would be shot "in their little black dresses." The moral complexities of the period were considerable: while Jacques Fath and Nina Ricci were often seen mixing with the German military, and Marcel Rochas was openly antisemitic, Madame Grès deliberately taunted the occupiers by presenting collections in patriotic red, white, and blue—for which she was closed down on several occasions for exceeding yardage restrictions or for offensive designs. Jacques Heim, himself Jewish, kept his salon running while hiding in Monte Carlo.

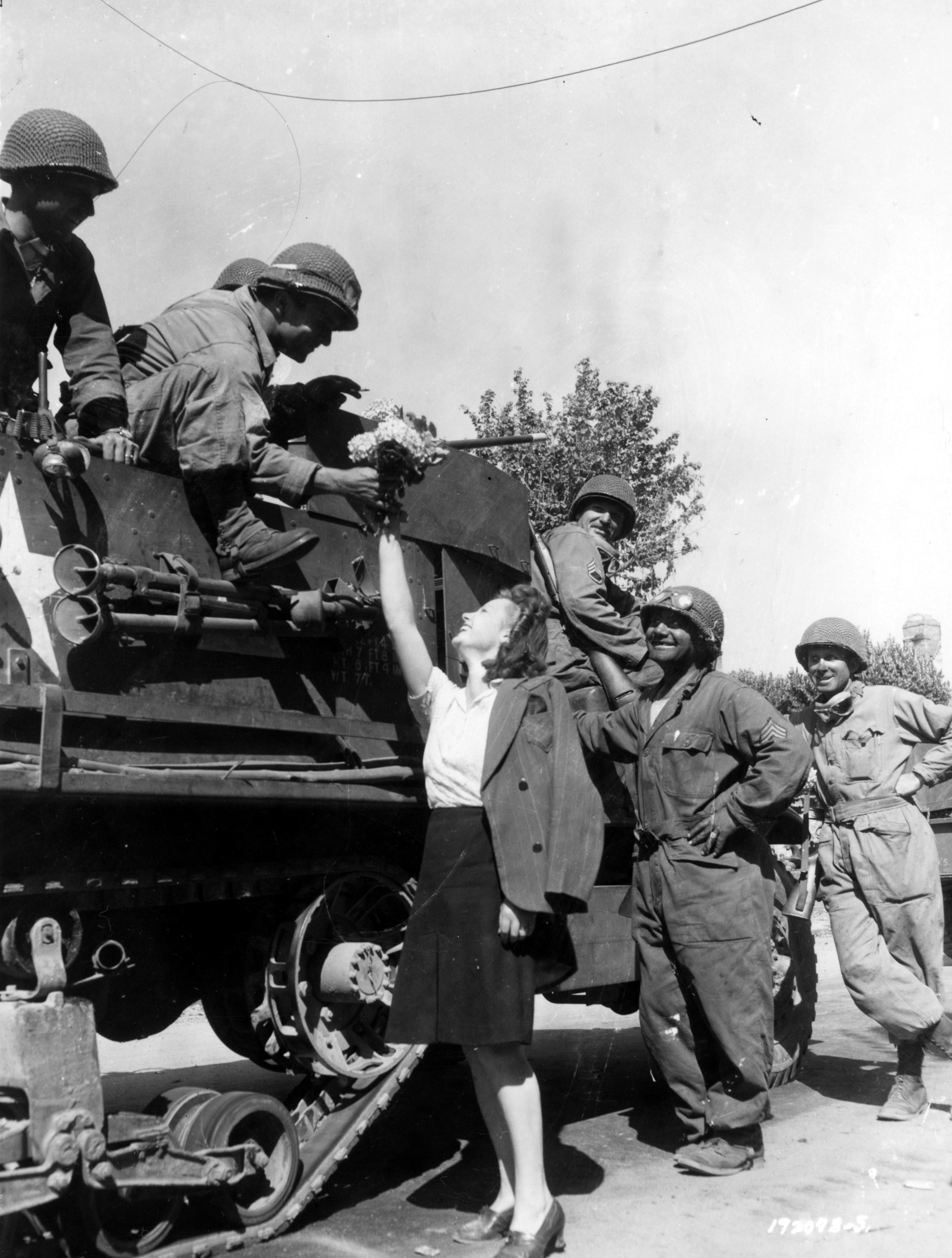
A young French woman salutes U.S. Army half-track crew members after the liberation of Avranches, 1944.

Despite the constraints, French fashion evolved in relative isolation as if it were "business as usual." Working from the romantic styles of the late 1930s, designers offered dresses with defined waists and full skirts and sleeves; waists grew smaller, hips larger, and drapery was common. Bustled and fuller skirts reflected a 19th-century influence; hats reached extravagant towering heights. Air raids known as alertes inspired a wave of practical accessories: Creed offered an "alerte plaid" shawl with large pockets; Molyneux showed black silk pajama pants with a hooded jacket and a "bleu alerte" sash; Piguet and Schiaparelli designed jumpsuits for bomb shelter dressing. For clients who had to cycle because of petrol rationing, Piguet and Balenciaga designed culottes to be worn hidden beneath skirts; Hermès offered zippered belts to conceal valuables and shoulder bags resembling hunting pouches. French women adopted an everyday look of tweed suits worn with low-heeled leather shoes, snoods, and berets.

Among occupied Paris's most visible youth subcultures were the Zazous, enthusiasts of American swing music that the German occupiers had forbidden. Zazou men wore long jackets, trousers wide at the top and tight at the bottom, bright socks, and large sunglasses—day and night; their female companions wore jackets with extremely wide shoulders and flippy skirts; all had elaborately styled hair with high rolls in front.

When Paris was liberated in August 1944, photographs of dressed-up Parisiennes circulated internationally. The revelation that nearly 100 salons had remained open throughout the occupation provoked outrage in Britain and the United States; US officials attempted to suppress the reports but failed. The foreign press condemned the 1945 and 1946 collections, and international buyers stayed away. Paris attempted to tone down its extravagance to align with the more understated fashions of New York and London, but by autumn 1946 the haute couture industry was on the brink of disappearing. American Vogue editor Edna Woolman Chase offered Lelong a platform in late 1944 to explain the industry's decisions; Lelong framed the choice to remain open as a decision to fight for its workers and its traditions, arguing that every yard of fabric used in France was one less yard available to Germany.

==== Britain: rationing and Utility ====
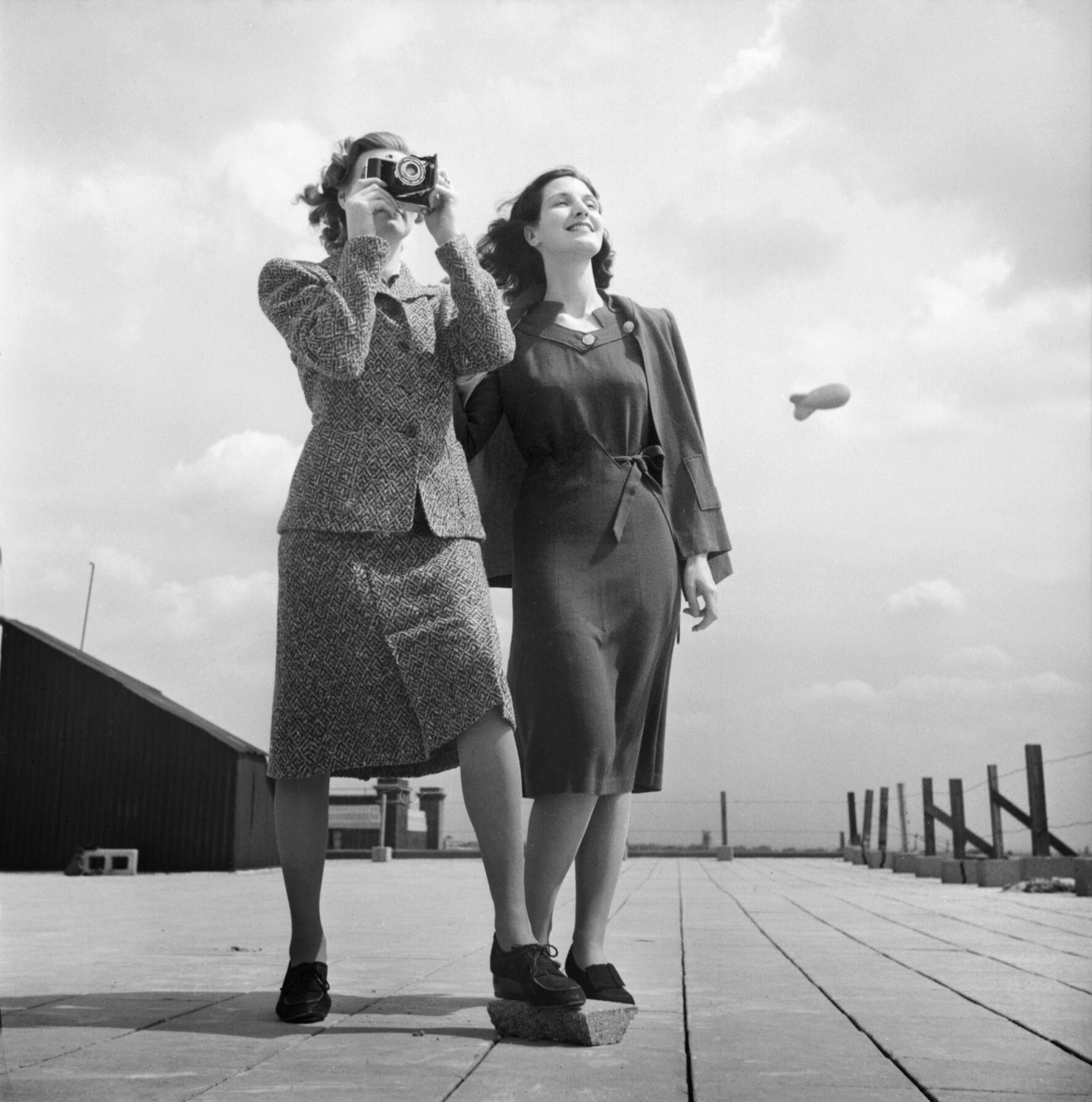
Two models in Bloomsbury, London, wearing dresses made under wartime Utility regulations, photographed for the Ministry of Information in 1943.

Britain's wartime fashion was shaped by three interlocking mechanisms: clothing rationing, Austerity directives, and the Utility Clothing Scheme. Early responses to the war included "siren suits"—jumpsuits that could be pulled on quickly during air raids. From June 1, 1941, clothing had to be purchased with a combination of money and coupons; seven coupons were needed for a dress and fourteen for a coat. The annual coupon allotment began at 66 and was reduced each year to 24 by 1945. Luxury items such as hats, furs, and lace were left off the coupon system altogether. Home sewing was exempt, and the government encouraged conservation through the "Make Do and Mend" campaign—first promoted under the less appealing name "Mend and Make-Do to Avoid Buying New," which provoked widespread discontent, before being relaunched with the help of the Women's Voluntary Service and a fictional character, "Mrs. Sew-and-sew," who offered practical advice on darning, mending, and repurposing garments. Holes were covered with embroidery, shirt tails were used to replace frayed collars, surplus army blankets were dyed and made into coats, and servicemen's plus fours proved "particularly useful" material for women's clothing. Blackout cloth, which could be bought without coupons, was widely used for slacks, slips, and underwear.

The Utility Clothing Scheme, launched in February 1942, aimed to bridge the gap in price and quality between cheap and expensive clothing by limiting the range of fabrics and garment models. Garments produced under the scheme carried the distinctive CC41 (Civilian Clothing 1941) label, guaranteeing quality standards and price controls. By 1942 around 50 per cent of all garments produced came under the scheme; by 1945 this had risen to 85 per cent, with 80 per cent of Utility goods manufactured in just 10 per cent of clothing factories. Austerity directives, introduced at roughly the same time, banned embroidery, lacework, metal buttons, zippers in most garments, and turn-ups on men's trousers, and limited the number of pleats, pockets, and seams as well as the amount of fabric per garment; only two box pleats were permitted per dress, and only six seams. Small floral and figurative prints were encouraged, as patterns with small repeats were easier to match at seams, generating less fabric waste.

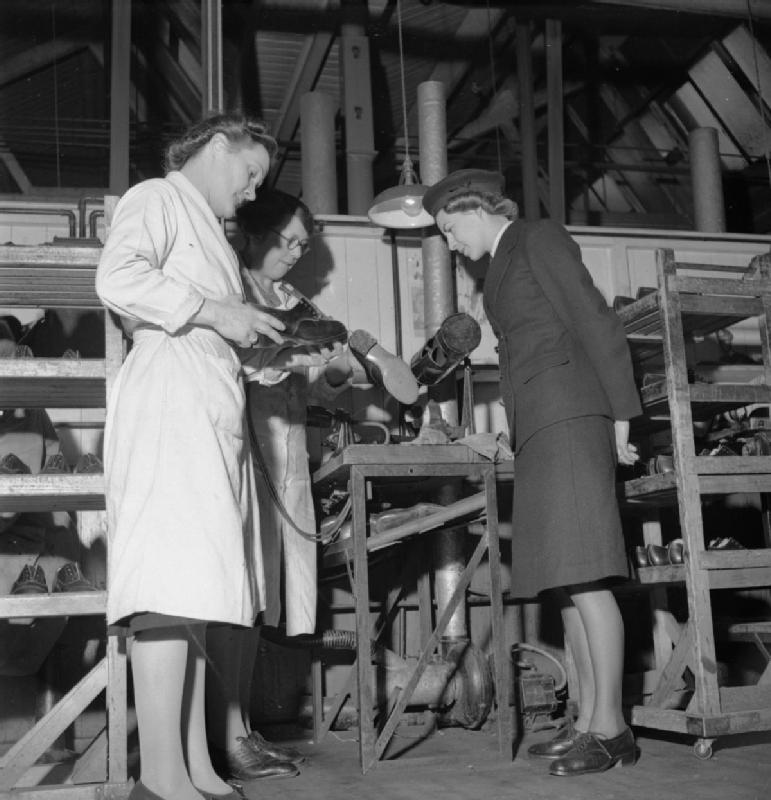
A shoe factory for the Women's Royal Naval Service in the Midlands, 1944.

The Incorporated Society of London Fashion Designers (INSOC), founded in 1942 on the model of the Paris couture syndicate, was brought in to design garments within the Utility scheme and raise its fashion credibility. The idea had originated with Alison Settle, editor of British Vogue. Participating designers included Norman Hartnell, Hardy Amies, Digby Morton, Peter Russell, Victor Stiebel, Bianca Mosca, Worth of London, Edward Molyneux, Charles Creed, and fashion editor Daisy Fellowes. Queen Elizabeth encouraged Hartnell's participation, telling him: "You have made so many charming things for me that if you could do likewise for my countrywomen, I think it would be an excellent thing to do." Thirty-two of the designs produced were put into production; when British Vogue praised their "restrained elegance" in its October issue, public opinion began to shift in Utility's favour. Powerful propaganda reinforced the message: photographs of Princess Elizabeth serving in the Auxiliary Territorial Service in an auto mechanic's uniform were especially potent.

Footwear faced its own challenges: leather was needed for military purposes, so alternative materials had to be found. Wooden soles could be purchased without coupons but were disliked for being stiff and noisy to walk in; split wooden soles attached by a leather hinge were developed as a partial solution. The traditional Bavarian walking shoe, the Haferlschuh, provided inspiration for a widely produced wartime style incorporating side lacing and contrasting color piping.

About 400,000 women joined the US army and nearly half a million served in the British armed forces. An attractive uniform could serve as a recruiting tool: the blue double-breasted jacket and skirt of the Women's Royal Naval Service (WRENS) was considered especially becoming, while the Women's Land Army uniform was widely regarded as unpopular for its drab appearance. Some services tried in vain to ban makeup; members of the Women's Auxiliary Air Force were required to ensure their hair did not touch their jacket collars. Women were also urged to knit gloves, scarves, gum-boot stockings, knee caps, and chest protectors for "our boys in the forces," with scarcity of wool encouraging knitters to unpick their old garments. In the United States, Eleanor Roosevelt addressed a "Knit for Defense" tea in New York and was frequently photographed knitting. In Britain, all women between 19 and 40 were required to register at their local Labour Exchange after March 1941; at its peak in 1943, over 80,000 women were serving in the Women's Land Army.

==== North America: L-85 and American design ====
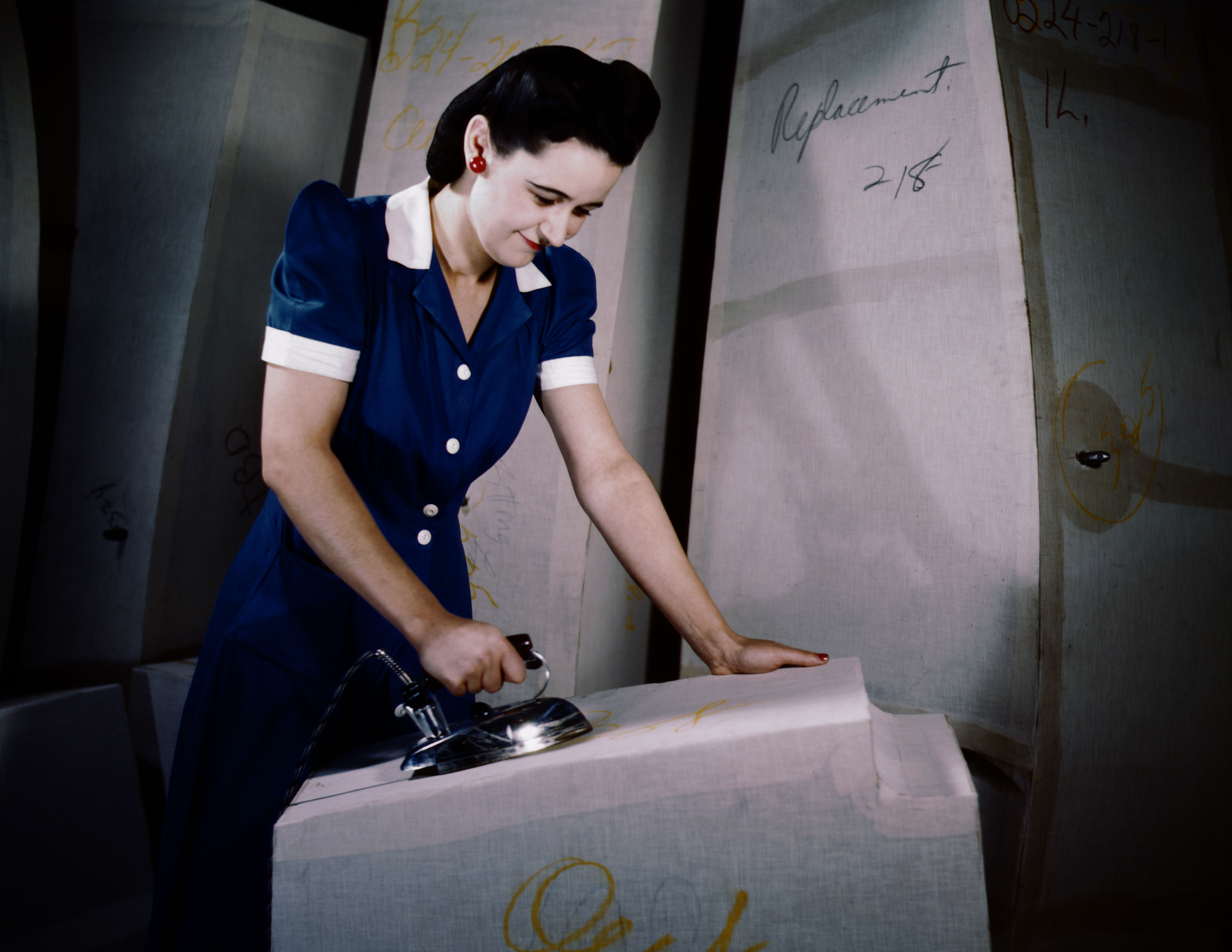
Manufacture of self-sealing gas tanks at Goodyear, Ohio, 1941.

In the United States, rationing was less severe than in Britain. The occupation of Paris, however, which cut off America from French couture for four years, created an unprecedented opportunity for American fashion to develop its own identity. As American Vogue declared in its September 1, 1940 issue: "For the first time, the fashion center of the world is here—in America." American designers, previously anonymous on their own labels, were now aggressively promoted. Lord & Taylor's vice president Dorothy Shaver had been central to this effort since the Depression: she had inaugurated window displays featuring named American designers in 1932, launched the "American Designers' Movement" in 1933, and established annual $1,000 design awards in 1938; in 1945 she trademarked "The American Look" as a campaign and retail brand.

Starting on April 8, 1942, American fashion was regulated by General Limitation Order L-85, devised by Stanley Marcus of Neiman Marcus to conserve fabric without prompting major style changes that would encourage consumers to discard what they already owned. The severest restrictions concerned wool: maximum jacket length was 25 inches, and skirts could be no more than 28 inches in length with a maximum circumference of 64 inches. French cuffs, dolman sleeves, and wool evening dresses were forbidden; hems were limited to 2 inches and most patch pockets were banned. Women were limited to three pairs of leather shoes per year; ballet flats, espadrilles, and rubber overshoes were among the unrationed alternatives. The fall 1942 collections—the first designed under the regulations—showed simple styles with innovative touches: drawstrings instead of metal fasteners, fur linings in place of wool, and highlights of sequins and braid. Vogue offered "A Primer on Pants" in 1941, advocating tailored, fly-front trousers as the most flattering option for women increasingly wearing slacks for work and leisure.

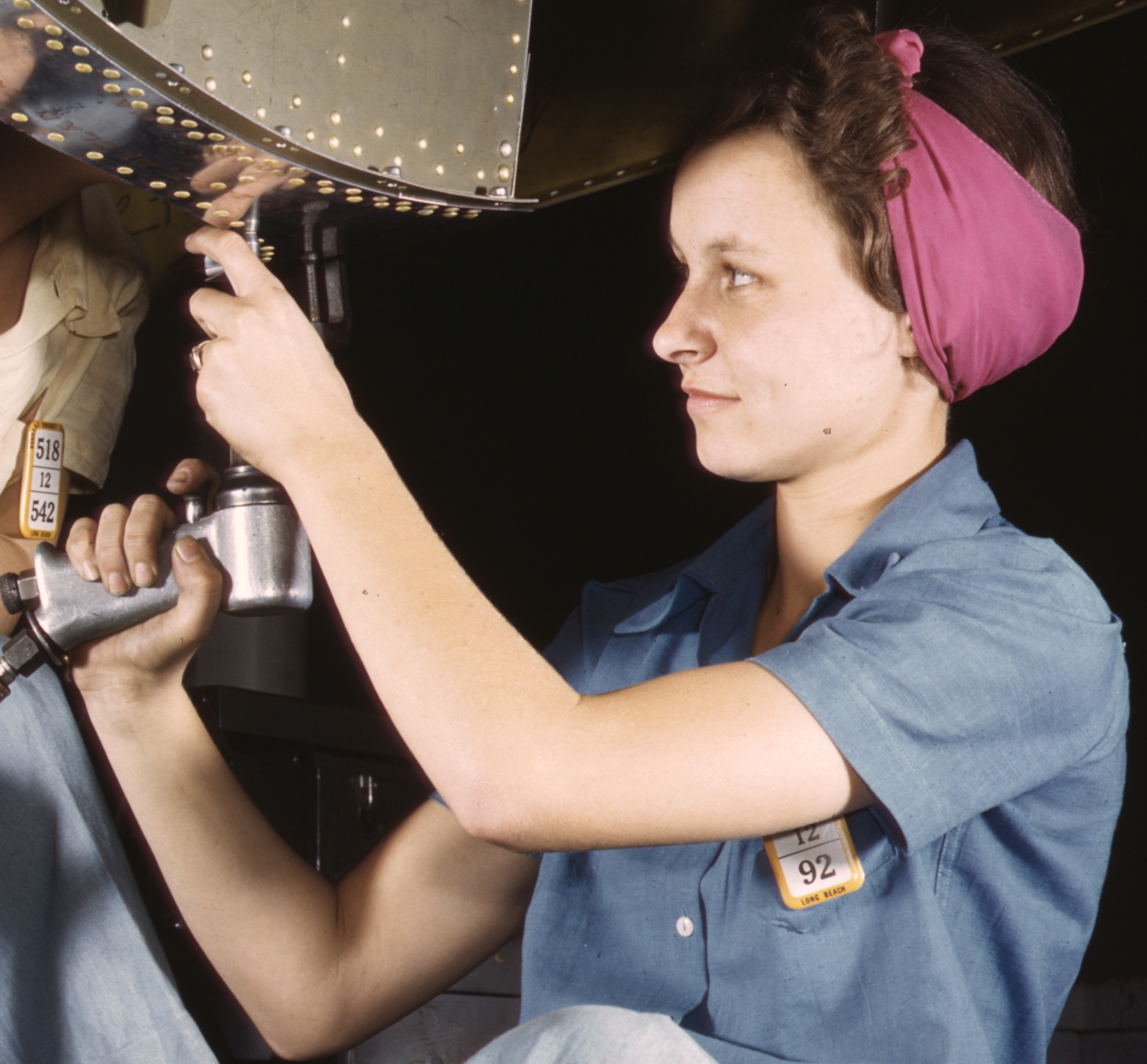
An American woman working at the Douglas Aircraft Company, 1942.

Two designers emerged as defining figures of American wartime fashion. Norman Norell (1900–1972), working under the label Traina-Norell, applied couture-level quality to ready-to-wear, imposing unusually high standards of workmanship. During wartime, he created figure-hugging sequined evening sheaths—sequins being among the materials not restricted by L-85—adding sparkle to the otherwise austere wartime atmosphere. Claire McCardell (1905–1958) was the decade's most original American voice. Influenced throughout her career by Madeleine Vionnet, McCardell developed a sportswear aesthetic at Townley Frocks emphasizing comfort, practicality, and femininity without menswear references. In 1942 her "Popover" dress debuted: a denim wrap dress that came with a matching oven mitt, sold by Lord & Taylor as "The Original Utility Fashion." When wool and silk were restricted, she turned to denim, seersucker, and jersey to create her classics. In 1944 she responded to the leather shoe shortage by pairing Capezio ballet slippers with her collections—a stylish and much-copied solution. Her designs appeared on the cover of Life magazine in 1943, and in 1945 she predicted in the Washington Star that the fashion silhouette would shift toward rounded shoulders and longer, fuller skirts—two years before Dior's New Look confirmed her forecast. Vera Maxwell designed coordinating separates for Seventh Avenue, including a notable 1942 ensemble of a bloomer playsuit, skirt, vest, and coat all made from artificially produced American fabrics. Katharine Hepburn's high-waisted slacks and button-down shirts epitomized the emerging "American look"—casual, sporty, and effortlessly elegant.

==== Accessories, hosiery and beauty ====
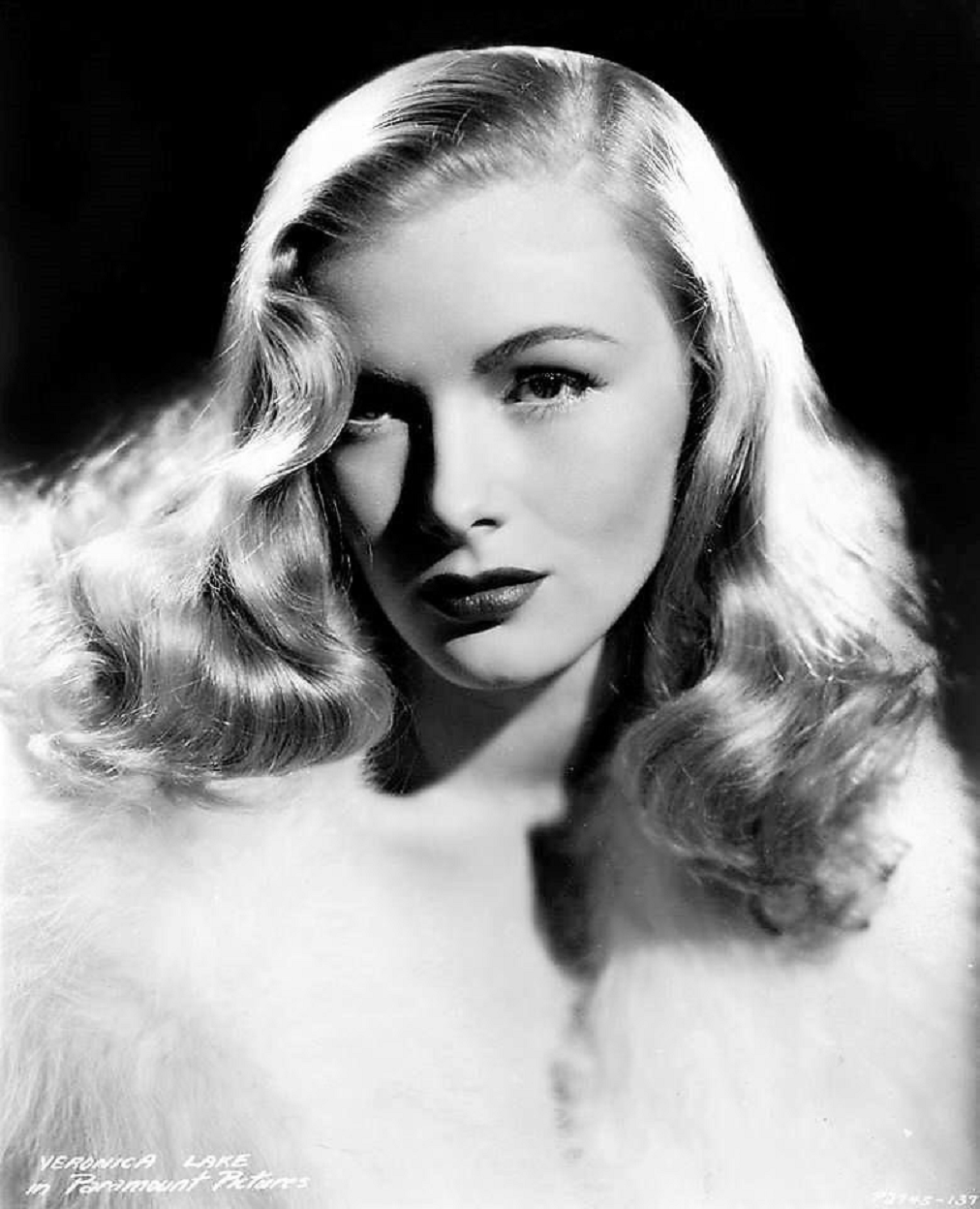
Publicity still of Hollywood actress Veronica Lake, a beauty icon of the 1940s.

The most dramatic wartime impact on women's dress was felt in hosiery. As early as September 1941, the American government embargoed Japanese silk, causing widespread hoarding of silk stockings; at that point nylon had accounted for about 25 per cent of stocking sales. By October 1942 nylon was in short supply, and by 1943 it was virtually unobtainable—inspiring the popular song "When the Nylons Bloom Again" by Fats Waller and George Marion Jr. Women resorted to stockings of wool, cotton, or rayon, or applied leg make-up—sometimes called "liquid stockings" or "stockings in a bottle"—to create the illusion of hosiery. In the United States, cosmetic firms introduced leg make-up in 1942; Schiaparelli's "Shocking Stocking" was a perfumed leg tint, and many women drew seam lines up the back of their legs with an eye pencil. In Britain, the efforts were even more desperate: women darkened their legs with gravy mix or cocoa.

Lipstick took on an especially potent symbolic role, consistently referred to as a "Morale-Builder." Women were told it was their duty to pay attention to their looks to lift soldiers' spirits; popular shades included "Fighting Red" and "Jeep Red" from Tussy, "Emblem Red" by DuBarry, and "Mrs. Miniver Rose" by Revlon. In continental Europe by 1943, shortages of the materials required to produce lipstick prompted women to use beetroot juice as a substitute; the British Board of Trade viewed make-up as essential to the war effort and secured minimum supplies throughout the conflict. Ingenuity compensated for other shortages: Vaseline was used to make eyeshadow last longer, and stocking-ladder repair fluid doubled as nail varnish.

Hair was worn in numerous variations of softly waved styles. "Victory rolls"—formed by parting the hair in the center and rolling up the sides diagonally to form a "V" shape when seen from the back—became one of the decade's most iconic hairstyles. Hollywood star Veronica Lake was famous for wearing her silky blonde hair draped over one eye in her celebrated "peek-a-boo" style, until both the British and American governments asked her to change her trademark look in order to inspire women factory workers to keep their hair pinned back for safety.

Accessories reflected both wartime ingenuity and ongoing fashion interest. Hats—exempt from coupon rationing—received more creative attention than almost any other garment; shapes ranged from Arab-style pillboxes to fedoras to pointed stocking caps, and milliners made imaginative use of whatever materials were available. Snoods, turbans, and headscarves were popular both for fashion and for workplace safety in factories. Bakelite jewelry remained popular, continuing the large-scale aesthetic of the 1930s; surrealist themes appeared in animal and floral forms, and plastic, bone, and wood replaced metal in accessories, buttons, and belt buckles.

=== 1946–1949: Post-war developments ===
==== The Théâtre de la Mode and competitive couture ====
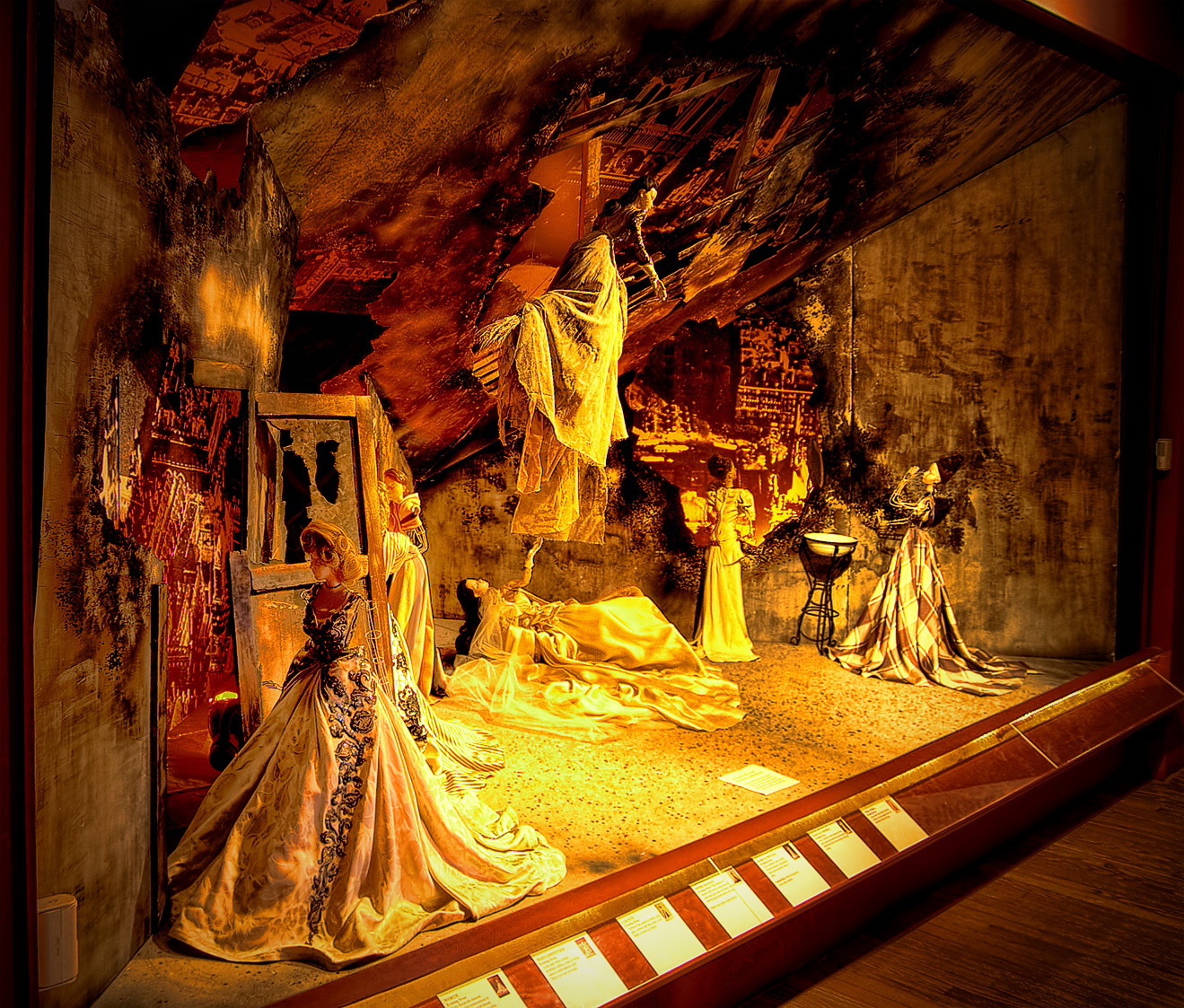
A reconstruction of Jean Cocteau's set design for the Théâtre de la Mode in 1945.

The liberation of Paris in August 1944 reopened the question of which city would lead international fashion in the post-war world. Norman Hartnell claimed that London's designers had given "the home product a stability and elegance which hitherto was possessed by Paris alone." In October 1945, Life magazine declared that "New York custom dresses are high fashion"; and the following year a "Britain Can Make It" exhibition in London showcased 5,000 goods—including ready-to-wear and couture clothing—that attracted some 1.5 million visitors.

France responded with the Théâtre de la Mode. During the winter of 1944–45, Lucien Lelong and Robert Ricci developed an exhibition of more than 200 wire mannequins, each approximately two feet tall, dressed in meticulously crafted miniature garments representing all the major Parisian couture houses. The exhibition opened in Paris on March 27, 1945, under the artistic direction of Christian Bérard, with thirteen leading artists providing settings that ranged from Parisian park scenes to an opening night at the Paris Opéra; Jean Cocteau's surrealistic "Ma Femme est une Sorcière" was among the most celebrated. Miniature accessories completed the ensembles, with jewels from Boucheron, Cartier, and Van Cleef & Arpels. After its Paris debut the exhibition toured London, Leeds, Copenhagen, Stockholm, and Vienna; for the New York showing in April 1946, the dolls were re-dressed to promote styles for spring/summer 1946—the first Parisian collections designed for export since the war. Among the younger designers who made notable debuts at the exhibition was Jacques Fath, whose "ligne stylo" (pen-line silhouette) attracted particular attention, and Pierre Balmain, who showed a fitted black evening ensemble with an eye-catching white fur piece. The Théâtre de la Mode was a triumphant demonstration of French couture's continued vitality and helped re-establish Paris's international dominance.

Austerity Regulations were lifted in England in 1946, but clothes rationing continued until 1949; Utility clothing was not phased out until 1952.

==== Christian Dior and the New Look ====
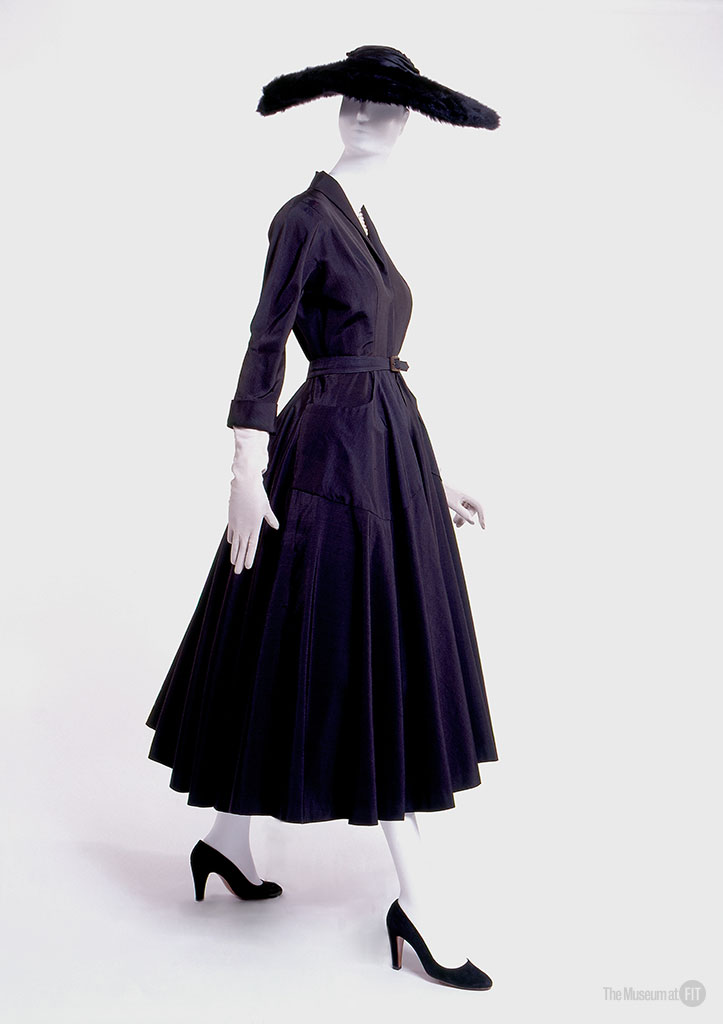
A 1947 ensemble by American designer Nettie Rosenstein, copying Dior's New Look design.

On February 12, 1947, on a cold day in Paris, Christian Dior unveiled his first collection, quickly dubbed the "New Look" by Carmel Snow, American editor of Harper's Bazaar—a designation that spread instantly throughout the fashionable world. Officially named the "Corolle" line after the inverted petal shape of its skirts, the collection was characterized by softer, narrower shoulders, a molded torso with a cinched-in waist (sometimes achieved through a short corset), emphasized and sometimes padded hips, and very full skirts that were shockingly more than one foot longer than any skirt seen in years. Frequently the silhouette was completed with a wide bergère-style hat. Harper's Bazaar declared Dior "agent provocateur and hero of the day" in April 1947, describing the collection as evoking "a world of elegant fantasy that had been suppressed during the war." The collection's most recognizable piece was the "Bar suit", which teamed a black wool crepe skirt with a jacket of ivory silk shantung with a shawl collar. The perfume Miss Dior was also launched that year.

Dior (1905–1957) had begun his career selling fashion illustrations in 1935 before working as assistant to Robert Piguet from 1938, and then joining Lucien Lelong in 1942 where he worked alongside fellow staff designer Pierre Balmain. While designing costumes at Lelong for the film Le Lit à Colonnes (1942), research into 19th-century fashion and tailoring techniques fired his imagination for what would become the New Look. His own house opened in 1946, with financial backing from textile manufacturer Marcel Boussac—who had made cloth for German uniforms during the war—in exchange for Dior's promise to use extravagant amounts of fabric.

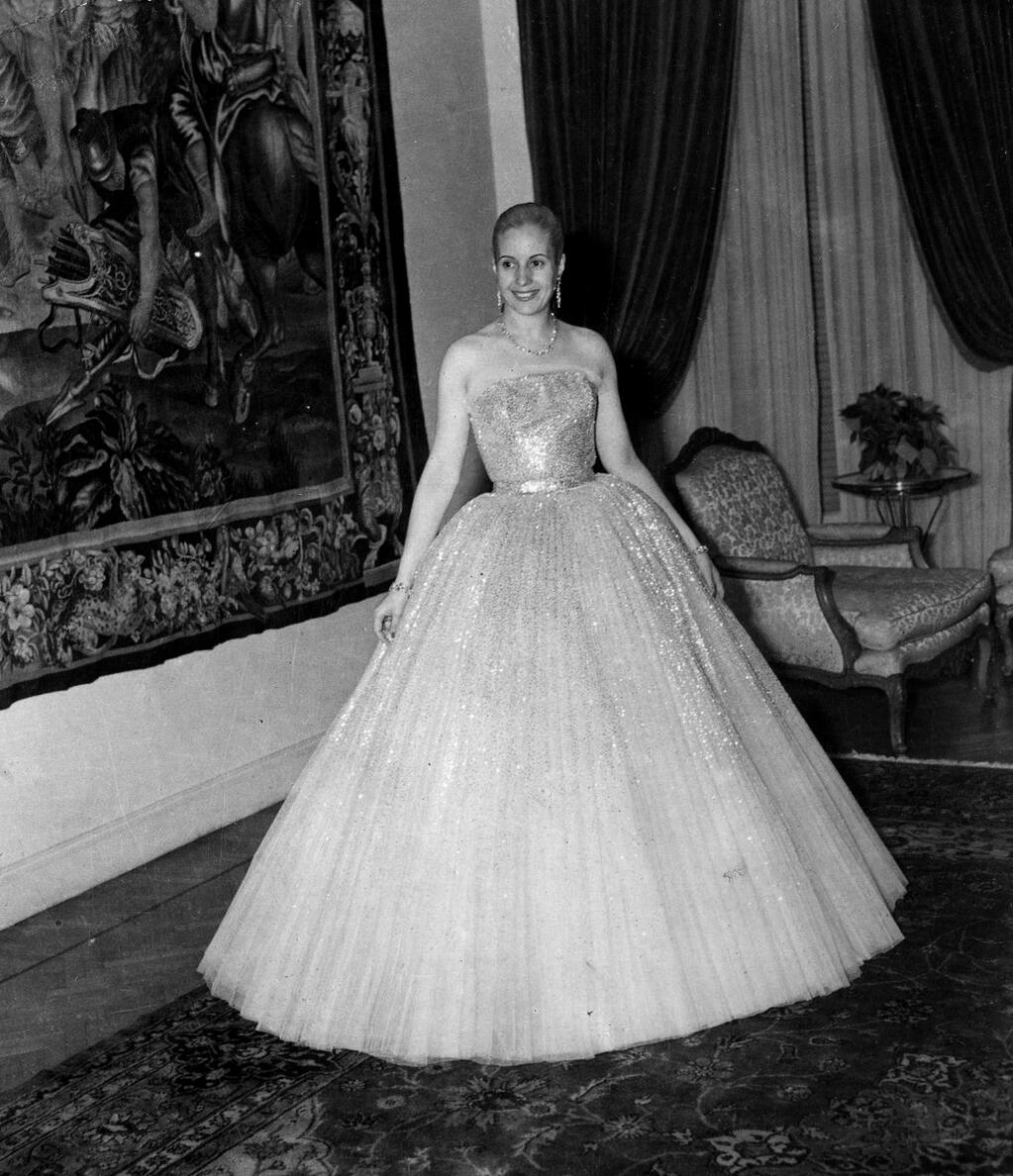
Eva Perón wearing a Dior gown at the Teatro Colón, 1949.

The silhouette was, as Dior himself acknowledged, not entirely new: the 19th-century-inspired line had been developing in France since 1939, and similar eveningwear silhouettes had appeared in the 1945 and 1946 collections of several designers. What was unprecedented was Dior's transformation of this evening elegance into luxurious daywear, and the sheer extravagance of the execution. As fashion historian James Laver observed: "The New Look was in fact not new at all, but simply an exaggeration of late 1930s and Occupation styles, yet it was the very antithesis of the clothing produced in both the UK and the United States during the war."

The New Look provoked widespread and often intense protest. In Britain, members of the Labour government scorned it as ridiculous and wasteful. In the United States, a Dallas housewife named Mrs. Bobbie Woodward founded the "Little Below the Knee Club" (LBKs) in protest at designs that covered women's legs; chapters spread to all 48 states and Canada, and demonstrators stormed Neiman Marcus. In Paris itself, models wearing the New Look were attacked during an outdoor photoshoot by citizens who saw the display of luxury as an affront while many still lived in dire straits. Despite the controversy, women gradually adopted versions of the style at all price levels. The Sears catalogue offered New Look-inspired skirts, dresses, and suits—with American magazines advising readers on how to lengthen existing hemlines by dropping skirt yokes or knitting extra fabric bands. Princess Margaret was an early adopter, wearing a New Look suit designed by Norman Hartnell in 1948. By 1957, Dior would account for over half of all Paris haute couture sales, with Rita Hayworth, Margot Fonteyn, and Princess Margaret among his most devoted clients.

It is worth noting that the New Look was not the only fashion story of 1947: narrow skirts, restrained tailored day suits, and cocktail dresses also appeared that season, and the square-shouldered silhouette of the wartime years continued alongside the new fuller look well into the late 1940s.

==== Post-war women's fashion ====
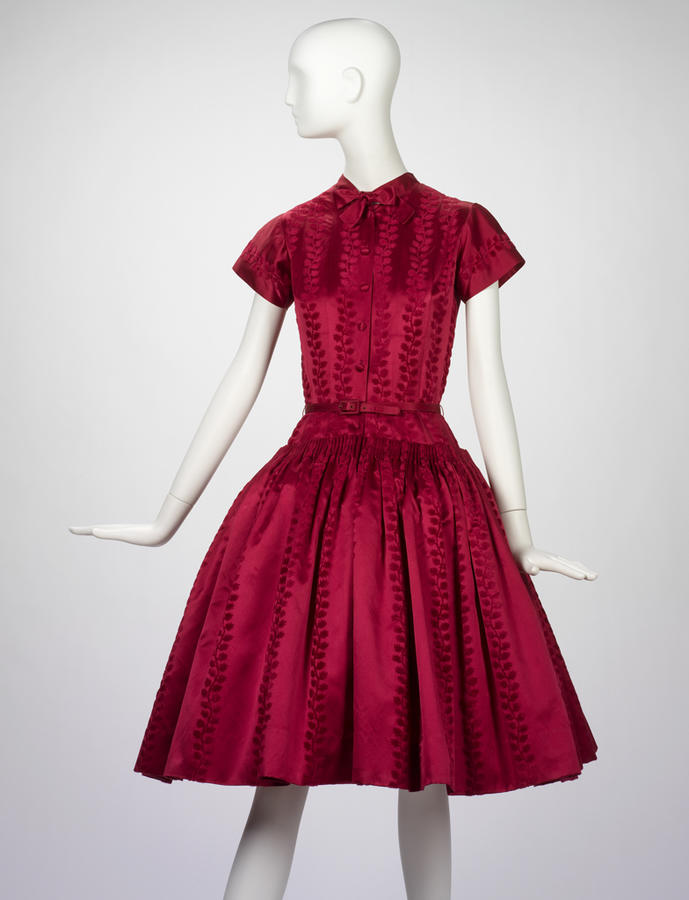
A red silk dress with cartridge pleated skirt by Norman Norell, 1949.

For the general public, the transition to the New Look was more gradual than the headlines suggested. Square padded shoulders continued for some time, boxy fit lingered in mass-market offerings, and mainstream retailers often showed longer skirts with shoulder pads rather than the full Dior silhouette. Day dresses featured increased fullness and fashionably longer hems; fuller sleeves in short, three-quarter, and long versions were popular; cocktail dresses increased in importance; and wedding gowns emphasized glamour and romance.

Foundation garments changed significantly to accommodate the new silhouette. Heavily structured one-piece foundations were worn alongside bra-and-panty-girdle combinations; pointed bra cups were achieved through spiral stitching; and petticoats were often attached to girdles. Maidenform unveiled its celebrated "I Dreamed…" advertising campaign in 1949, which would run for two decades. Frederick's of Hollywood was founded in 1947. The return of nylon stockings after their wartime absence was greeted with enormous relief; innovations included seamless stockings and new textures. Loungewear and negligees became more prominent in the fashion media, with the old-fashioned term "tea gown" making a return.

The most dramatic swimwear news of the post-war years was the invention of the bikini. Both fashion designer Jacques Heim and automotive engineer Louis Réard claimed to have introduced brief bathing suits to the Riviera in 1946. Heim unveiled his "Atome"; Réard's even skimpier version was the first to be patented and took the name "bikini" from the site of that year's nuclear weapons testing in the Marshall Islands. Réard's design was composed of four triangles and was modeled by a showgirl, considered scandalous throughout France and Europe. Harper's Bazaar in 1947 described such a suit only as a "token sunning suit."

==== Key designers ====
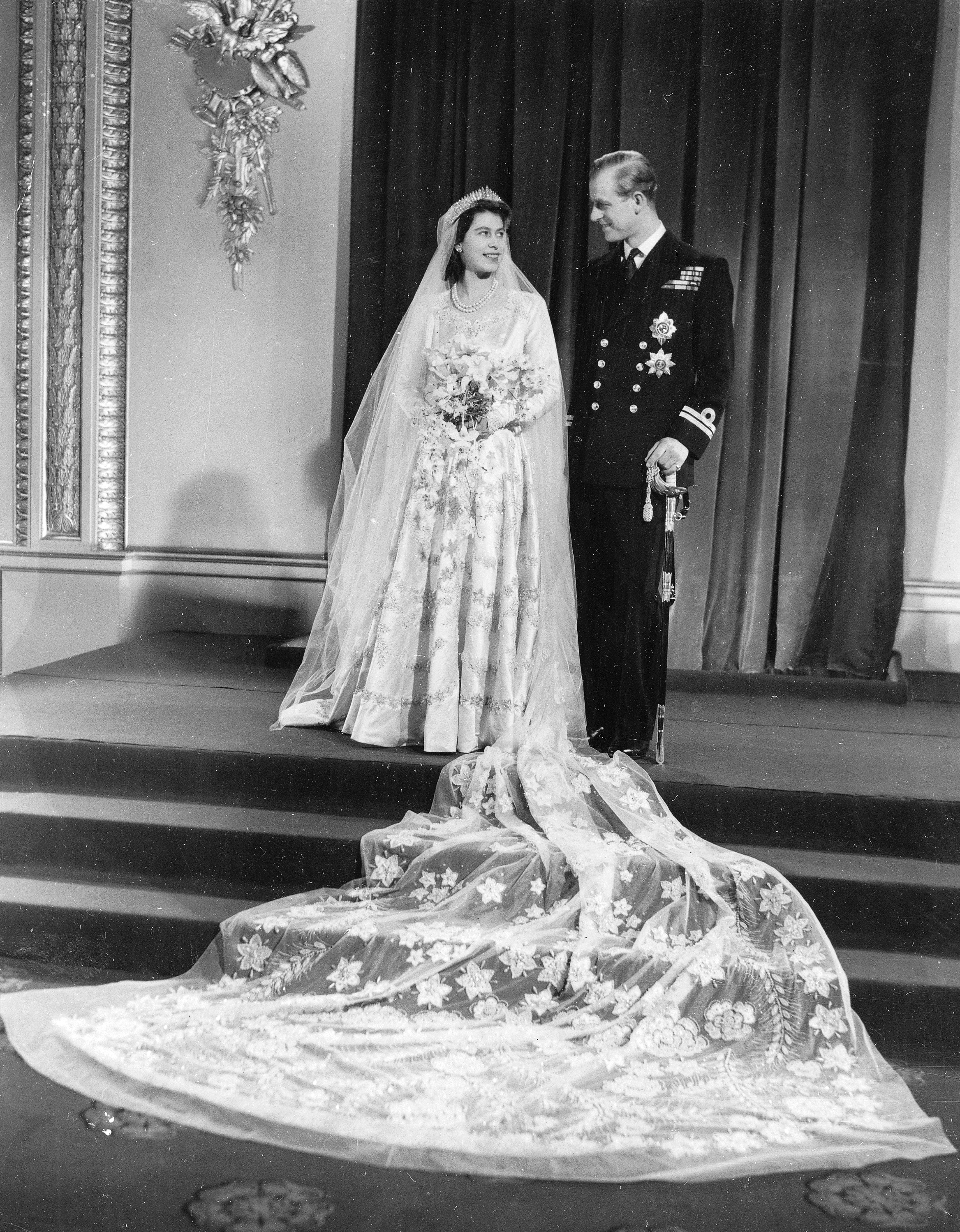
Wedding portrait of Princess Elizabeth and Prince Philip, Duke of Edinburgh, 1947.

Among the French designers who defined post-war fashion, Jacques Fath (1912–1954)—a former actor and stockbroker who had opened his couture house in 1937—stood out for his theatrical, femme fatale aesthetic. His eveningwear made dramatic use of tulle in unusual shades; among his clients were Eva Perón and Rita Hayworth, for whose 1949 marriage to Aly Khan he created a celebrated wedding trousseau. Pierre Balmain (1914–1982) showed his first collection to great acclaim in fall 1945, quickly earning an international clientele; by 1946 he was promoting a rounded hipline in his "cloche" and "sifflet" silhouettes, often with exotic fur trimmings. Marcel Rochas introduced his celebrated "Femme" fragrance in 1945 and revived a corseted silhouette, becoming particularly celebrated for eveningwear executed in black Chantilly lace. Mad Carpentier, founded in 1939 by Mad Maltezos and Suzie Carpentier—both former Madeleine Vionnet employees—survived the occupation, participated in the Théâtre de la Mode, and emerged as an important post-war house celebrated for luxurious fabrics and romantic, historically inspired coats and dresses.

In Britain, Norman Hartnell resumed his luxury business after the war, embarking on a promotional tour of Brazil and Argentina in 1946 that included a showing at Harrods Buenos Aires attended by Eva Perón. His most celebrated commission of the decade was the wedding dress for Princess Elizabeth's marriage to Prince Philip on November 20, 1947: fashioned from ivory silk satin with a sweetheart neckline, lined in taffeta and stiffened with horsehair, and heavily embellished by Hartnell's embroidery studio with designs of lilies, orange blossoms, and roses. As wartime restrictions were still in place in 1947, the Princess had to save up ration coupons for the materials; the romantic beauty of the dress offered a symbolic end to the deprivations of war and was copied by brides throughout the world. Hardy Amies (1909–2003), after wartime service in Belgium's special operations, opened his own shop on Savile Row and quickly became one of the most important forces in post-war British fashion; his tailored suits embraced the spirit of the New Look but placed it within the contextual legacy of 19th-century British equestrian clothes. Charles Creed designed with overt inspiration from military uniforms, with braid and button details; Digby Morton was celebrated for exceptional tailoring quality; and Victor Stiebel became chairman of the Incorporated Society of London Fashion Designers in 1946 while creating luxurious eveningwear for the Jacqmar label.

American post-war fashion continued to build on wartime foundations. Claire McCardell embraced the prevailing New Look silhouette but on her own terms—mixing down-to-earth fabrics with the more feminine silhouette, using raglan sleeves for a rounded shoulder, and artfully manipulating stripes and plaids—receiving a Neiman Marcus Award in 1948. In 1949, Dorothy Shaver launched "The American Look" at Lord & Taylor, a line of casual but elegant sportswear featuring designs by McCardell, Clare Potter, and Bonnie Cashin.

== Men's fashion ==
=== Wartime ===
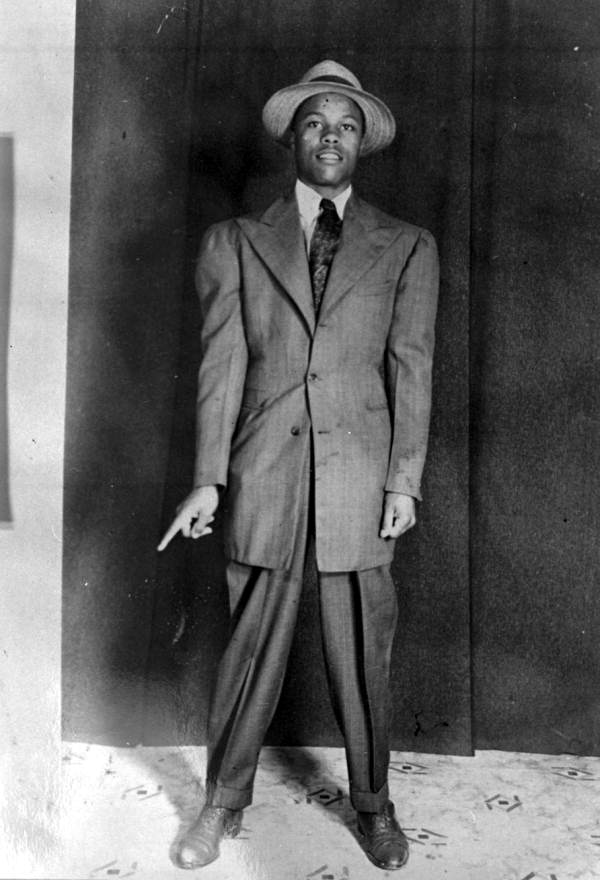
A young man wearing a zoot suit in Tallahassee, c. 1942.

The massive deployment of men into military service meant that uniforms dominated male dress throughout the war years. Manufacturers of tailored civilian clothing, deprived of their primary market, focused instead on older men and the youth market. Government restriction programs simplified menswear across the Allied nations. In the United States, Victory suits were made without patch pockets, trouser cuffs, or pleats; double-breasted suits were reduced to matching jacket and trousers without a vest; and a maximum jacket length of 29¾ inches was established for a size 37. British Utility suit designs eliminated waistcoats, trouser cuffs, and pocket flaps. In France, yoke backs, tunnel belt loops, and double trouser cuffs were banned; trousers could have only one hip pocket. In general, austerity measures had a greater effect on women's fashion than on men's, as the wide-legged, long-coated silhouette of men's suits was largely preserved.

For leisure, colorful clothing was welcomed as a counterpoint to wartime drabness. The Hawaiian shirt, already popular since the 1930s, took on patriotic overtones related to the wartime focus on Hawaii and the South Pacific; these shirts were often made of rayon and combined botanical images with island-themed fantasies.

The most controversial men's fashion of the wartime period was the zoot suit. Originally associated with African American jazz musicians and entertainers—featuring wide-shouldered long draped jackets, wide pegged trousers, and exaggerated accessories—the style was subsequently adopted by Mexican Americans in California as a symbol of cultural identity and marginalization. During rationing, the exaggerated use of fabric was regarded as unpatriotic and subversive. In June 1943 the "Zoot Suit Riots" erupted in Los Angeles, when white US soldiers and sailors attacked Mexican American men identifiable by their voluminous attire. The Parisian counterpart was the Zazou (or Petit Swing), who similarly used drape shapes, wide peg trousers, and low-slung key chains to signal disaffection with the German occupation. A British wartime phenomenon was the "spiv" or "wide boy"—a black market street trader recognizable by his double-breasted suit, soft hat worn at a rakish angle, wide tie, and neatly trimmed mustache. Frank Sinatra exemplified a different masculine style, favoring soft sports shirts, wide-cuffed peg trousers, and co-respondent shoes, wearing large knots on his four-in-hand ties.

=== Post-war ===
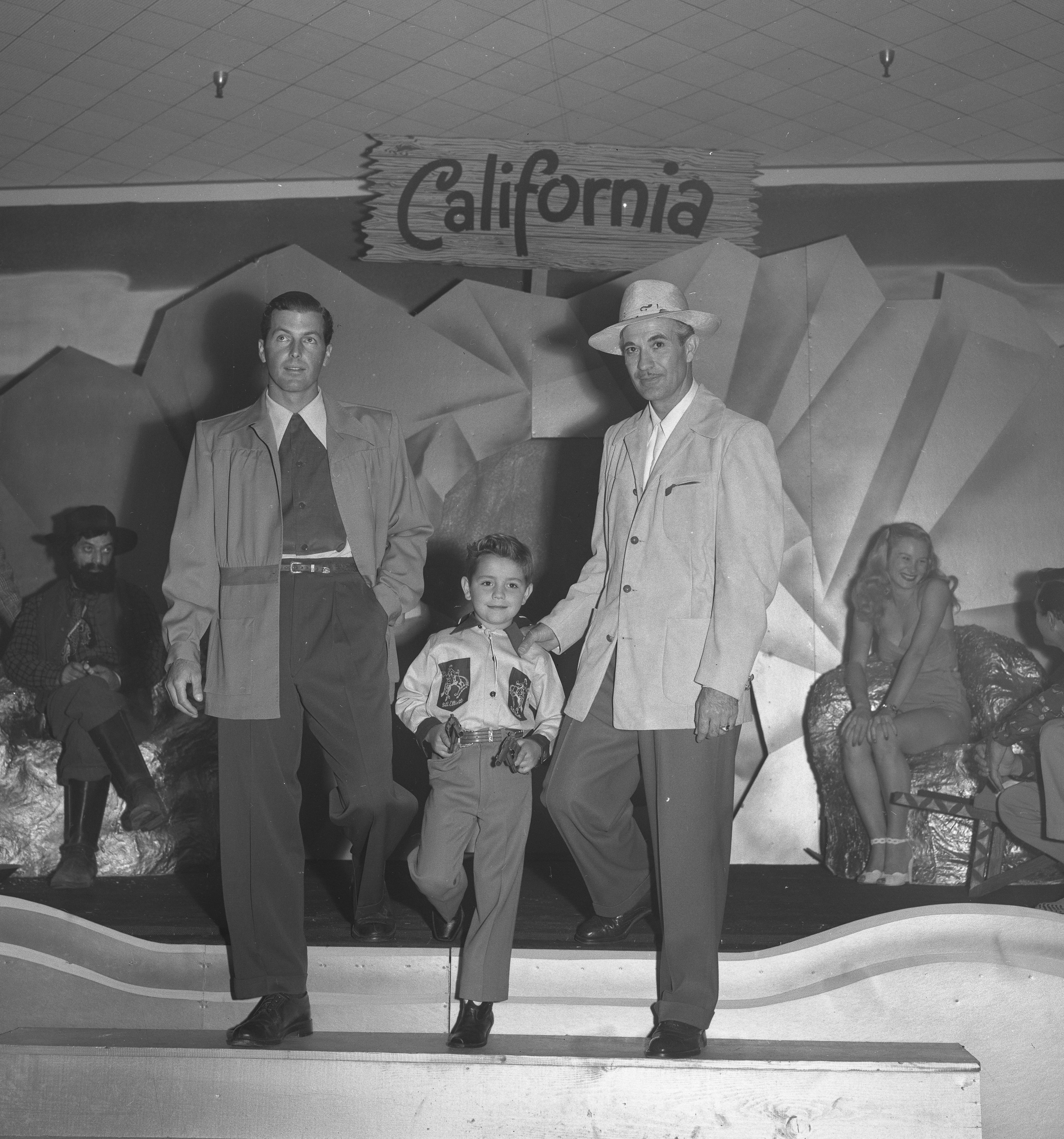
A menswear fashion show in California, 1948.

When British servicemen completed their wartime service they were issued at demobilisation centers with a "demob" suit—either single-breasted three-piece or double-breasted two-piece—and a raincoat-style coat. These suits were frequently of reasonable quality cloth but suffered from poor fit, and were widely regarded as unpopular. By the end of the decade, young men in Britain were looking instead toward Savile Row's highly tailored "Edwardian" styles.

Once wartime restrictions were lifted, trousers reverted to looser pleated styles tapering to narrow cuffs, and jackets were often cut longer and buttoned low in a zoot-suit-influenced manner. One of the most influential items of post-war menswear was the wool duffle coat associated with Field Marshal Bernard Montgomery, which became enormously popular especially among younger men. The Eisenhower jacket—a waist-length military style favored by General Dwight D. Eisenhower—had first been adopted by women as a suit jacket during the war and later crossed into men's casual wear.

In 1948, Esquire magazine articulated the prevailing post-war aesthetic as the "Bold Look": jackets with broad shoulders and wide lapels; trousers pleated and high-waisted; neckties wide and patterned with tropical motifs, art deco-style designs, novelty prints, and vivid colors; accessories including pocket squares and wide-brimmed hats; and dinner jackets increasingly available in alternative colors and fabrics. The trend for color and pattern extended into loungewear and sleepwear. Hawaiian shirts, brought back by servicemen returning from the Pacific, spread into mainstream leisure wear in the post-war years.

== Children's fashion ==
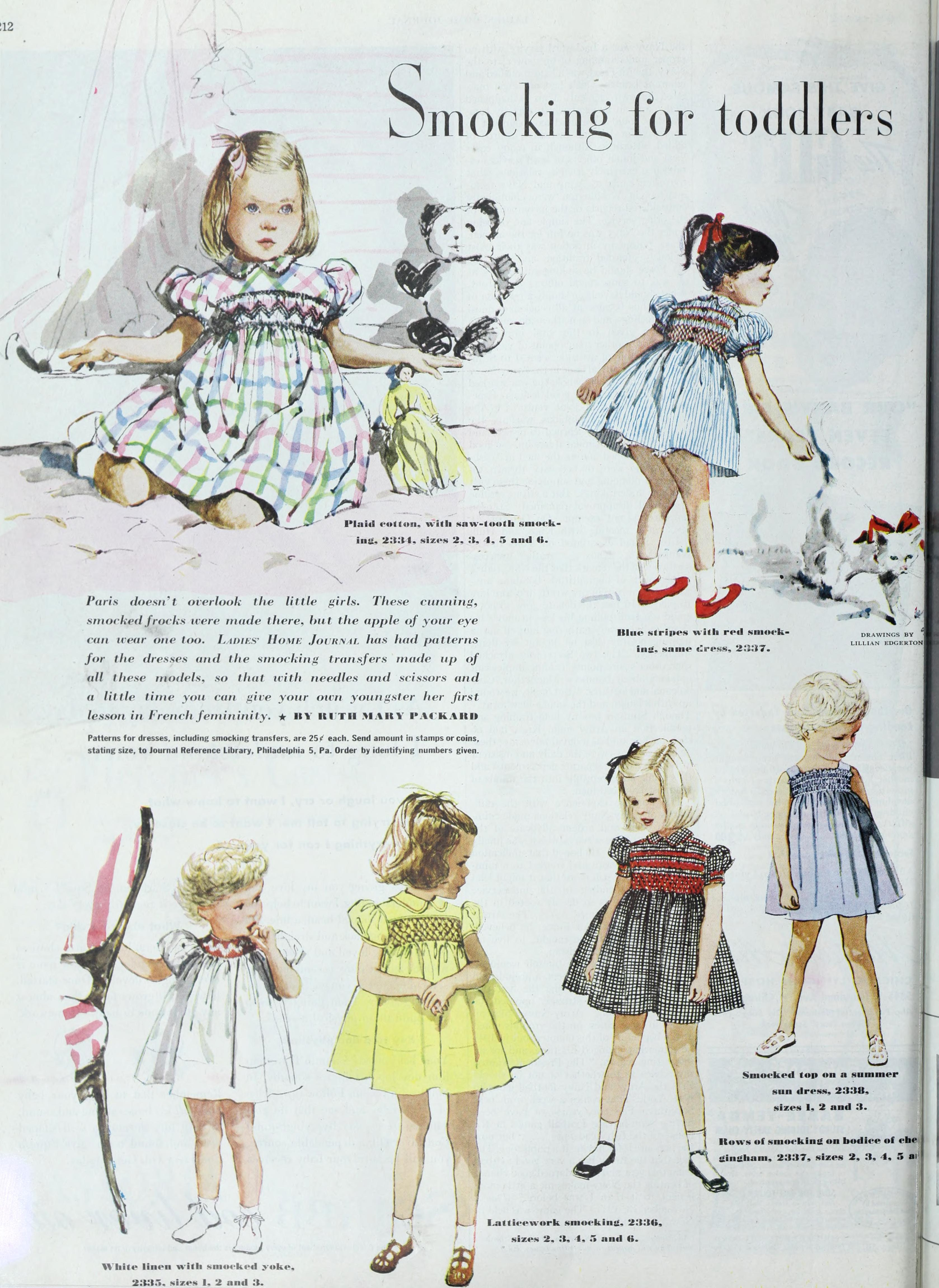
A fashion plate for toddlers in the Ladies' Home Journal, 1948.

Children's fashion during the war was shaped by the same conditions of rationing and austerity that governed adult dress. Recognizing that children would outgrow their clothes more rapidly than adults, governments assigned lower coupon values to children's garments, allowing more items to be purchased; additional coupons were provided for babies and for children growing above average height or weight. Second-hand and homemade clothing was especially widespread for children; hand-knitted sweaters, cardigans, and mittens were easily and popularly produced items. Some families dressed children in child-size versions of actual military service uniforms, sold through catalogs like Sears for special occasions. Adult clothing was frequently cut down and remade for children, and conservation campaigns included specific guidance on making and repairing children's garments.

For girls, toddlers and school-age girls wore dresses, jumpers over blouses, and skirt and top combinations. Cotton dresses with Peter Pan collars, puffed sleeves, and full skirts were popular, with smocking on the bodice especially prevalent. Where girls' dresses in the 1930s had emphasized high waists, most 1940s styles featured defined natural waists. Gingham, plaids, florals, and bright colors were popular, often worn with contrasting white collars. In the later post-war years, pinafores worn over dresses and folk-inspired styles such as dirndl skirts appeared. Young boys wore short pants or knickers with shirts and sweaters; tailored suits with short pants or knickers were worn for formal occasions.

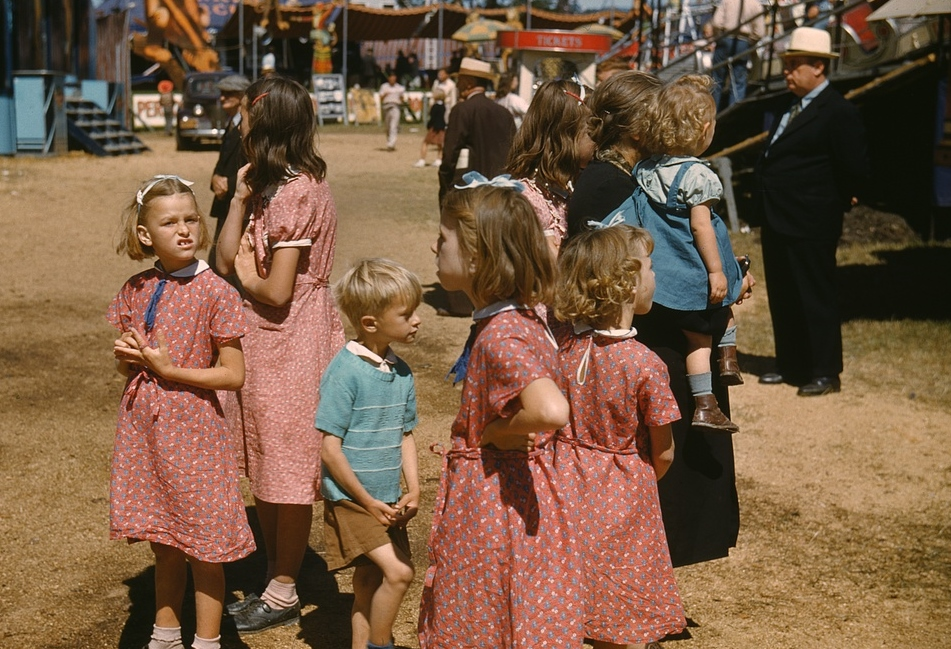
Children at the Vermont state fair, Rutland, 1941.

The junior market received growing attention from designers and retailers. High-end stores opened dedicated junior shops; mass-market catalogs also expanded their offerings for high school and college-age girls. Emily Wilkens (1917–2000) was a pioneering innovator in this market. She brought modernity to junior clothing, including, controversially, featuring black for teenage girls' party dresses in a 1944 collection for Bonwit Teller; she incorporated dirndl skirts, folk styles, and 19th-century-inspired designs, and received a Coty Award in 1945 for her rapidly growing reputation. Typical junior looks included skirts and sweaters (often worn in the loose "Sloppy Joe" style), tailored suits, and slacks—available in denim, wool flannel, and other fabrics, cut with wide legs, a high waist, and always a side or back closure. Saddle shoes were popular, and wearing higher heels was a social milestone for teenage girls.

The post-war turn toward more generous use of materials was felt immediately in children's fashion, especially in the United States, the first major nation to end fabric restrictions. By 1946, magazines and catalogs showed trouser suits "like Dad's" for young boys who previously would have worn shorts or knickers; girls' clothes reflected the return to femininity with more volume, details, and romantic looks for special occasions. Designer fashions for children expanded: Townley introduced Baby McCardells and Junior Editions by Claire McCardell; Jacques Heim's successful Jeunes Filles line received renewed post-war attention; and fuller skirts with lower hemlines reflected the changing adult silhouette.

== Fashion media ==
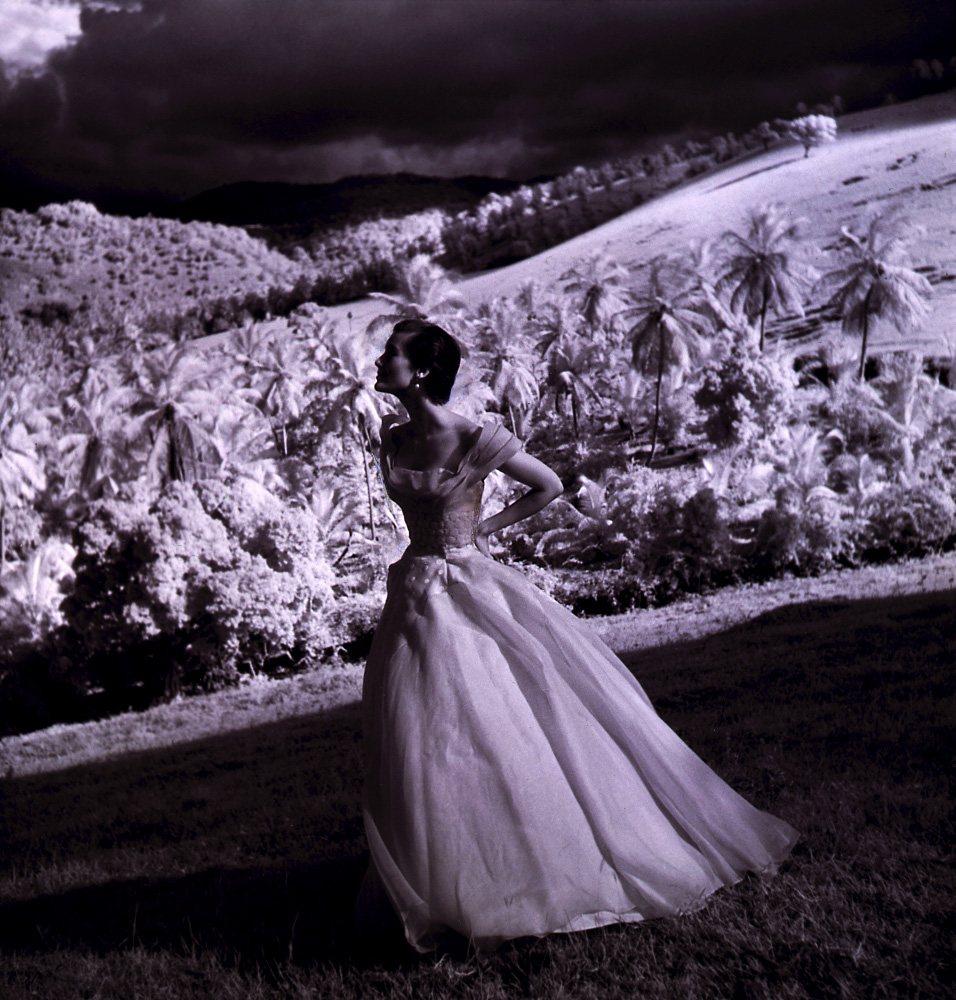
A 1948 fashion photograph by Toni Frissell in Jamaica.

Fashion magazines navigated the contradictions of the decade with notable resilience. Under longtime editor Edna Woolman Chase, American Vogue added features on canned foods and war effort participation while maintaining its fashion coverage; war-themed covers with patriotic colors and graphics appeared on all major titles. Lee Miller—already known as a fashion model—emerged as a significant war photographer; Audrey Withers, editor of British Vogue, was among the first to recognize her talent, publishing Miller's shocking photographs of the war's devastation, including images from the liberation of the Buchenwald concentration camp. Established photographers Erwin Blumenfeld, John Rawlings, and Louise Dahl-Wolfe continued their work; new talents in fashion photography included Irving Penn and Richard Avedon. Among illustrators, René Gruau, Jacques Demachy, Carl "Eric" Erickson, and Marcel Vertès created dramatic fashion images. Lisa Fonssagrives represented a new generation of fashion figures, with the term "model" beginning to replace "mannequin" in English-language publications.

In September 1944, Seventeen made its debut as the first American magazine aimed specifically at high school girls; Hearst's Junior Bazaar targeted a similar young women's market. French Vogue suspended publication for a period during the war. At the war's end, magazines pivoted sharply back to femininity: in January 1946 Vogue declared "Back on the pedestals, ladies" and "Fashions are here to help women remember their sex."

The film noir aesthetic of the 1940s made a lasting impact on both visual culture and fashion. The term was coined by French critics in the post-war period to describe dark-themed American thrillers produced from around 1940, including Double Indemnity (1944) and Murder, My Sweet (1944). The female characters—femmes fatales using their beauty as a weapon—were costumed to reflect their deadly allure, from menswear-inspired daywear to figure-molding evening dresses. Barbara Stanwyck embodied the look with sharp-shouldered suits, dark lipstick, and lacquered blonde hair. Fashion photography borrowed heavily from the film noir aesthetic, using deeply shadowed interiors lit through venetian blinds to convey both glamour and mystery.

In 1948 the first Academy Award for Best Costume Design was presented in two categories: Roger Furse was honored for Hamlet (black and white), and Barbara Karinska and Dorothy Jeakins won for Joan of Arc (color).

== Image galleries ==
=== Style gallery: Women's fashion, 1940–1945 ===
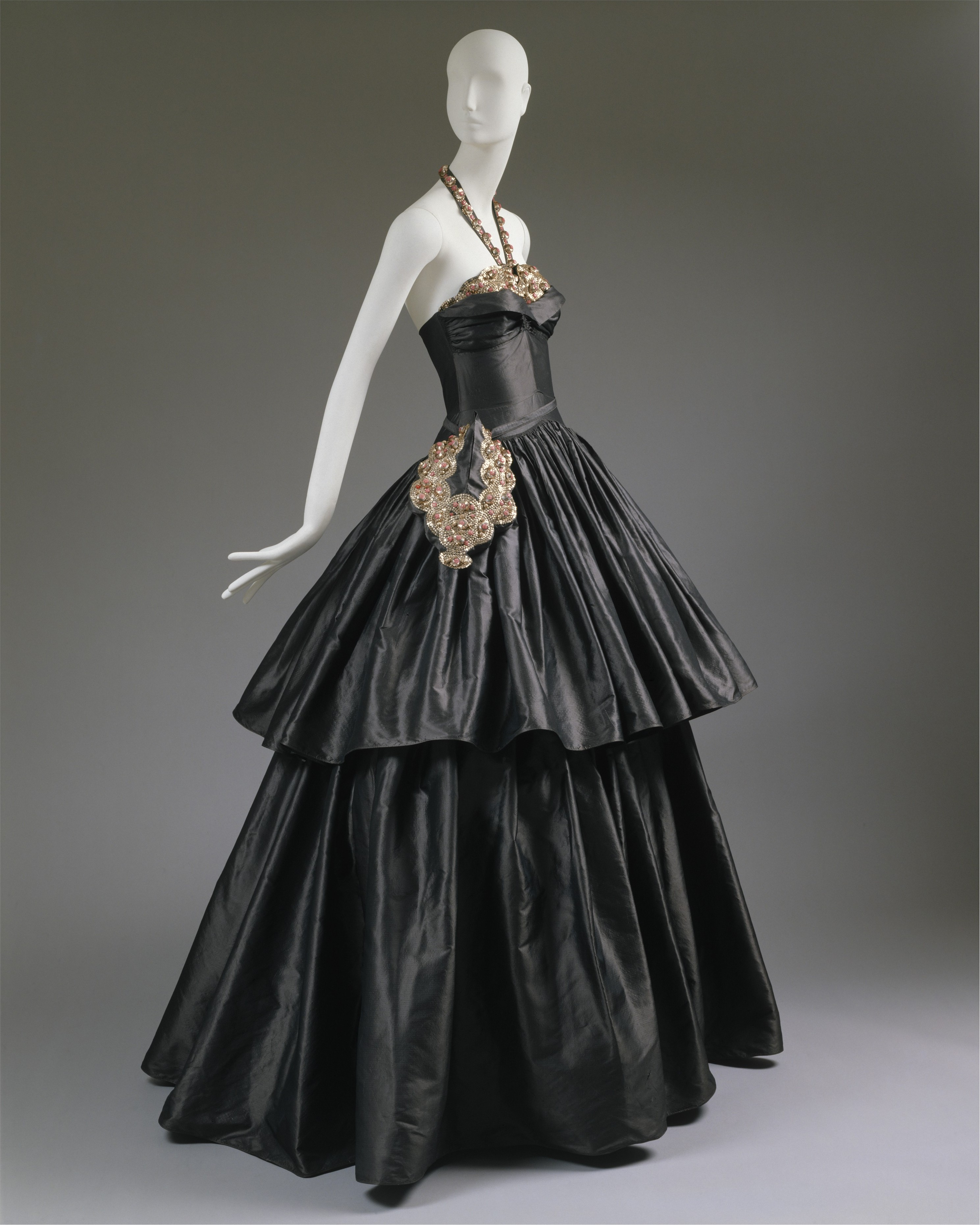
Cyclone, an evening dress by Jeanne Lanvin worn by her daughter Jeanne de Montagnac in 1940.

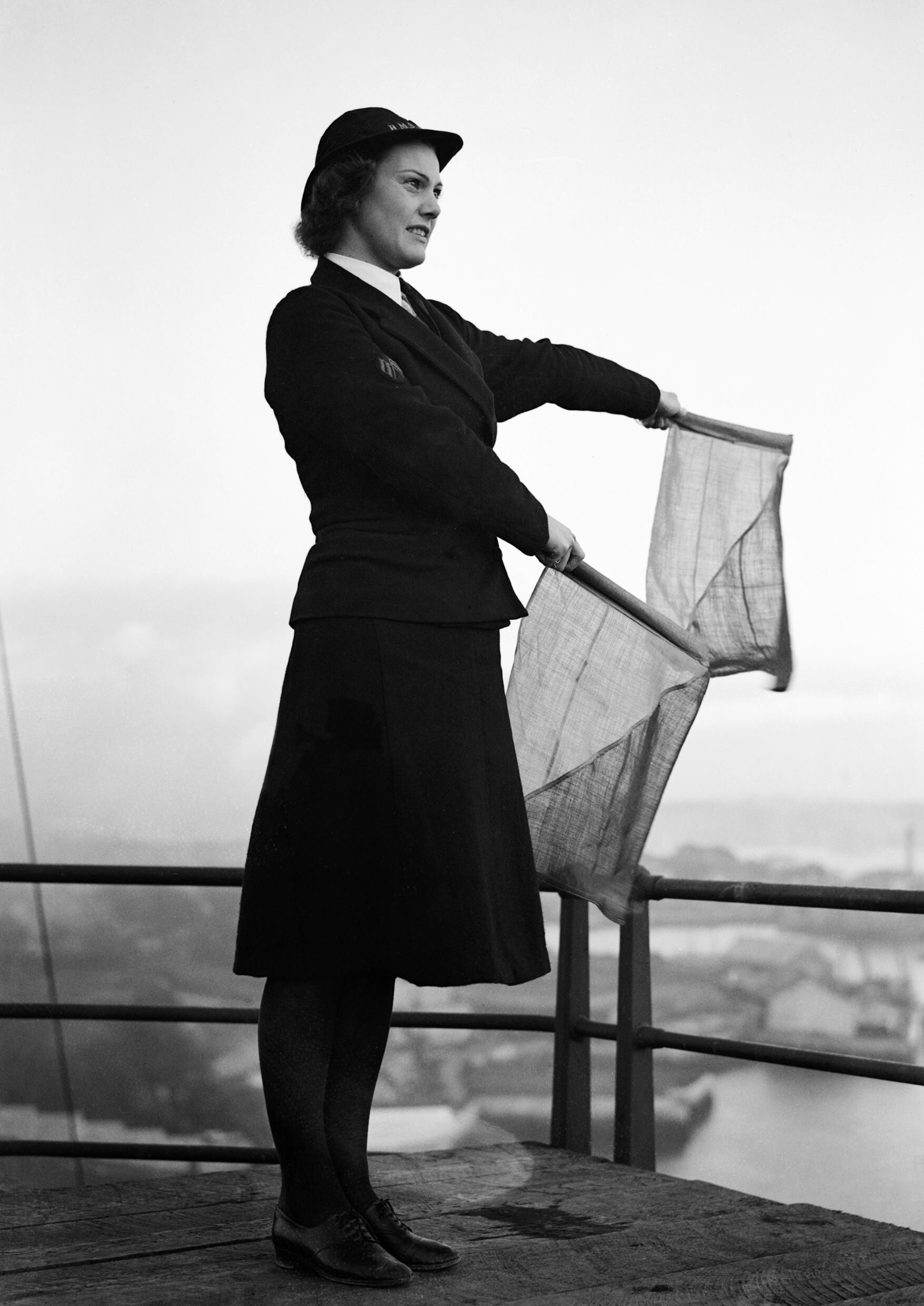
A Women's Royal Naval Service signaller in 1940.

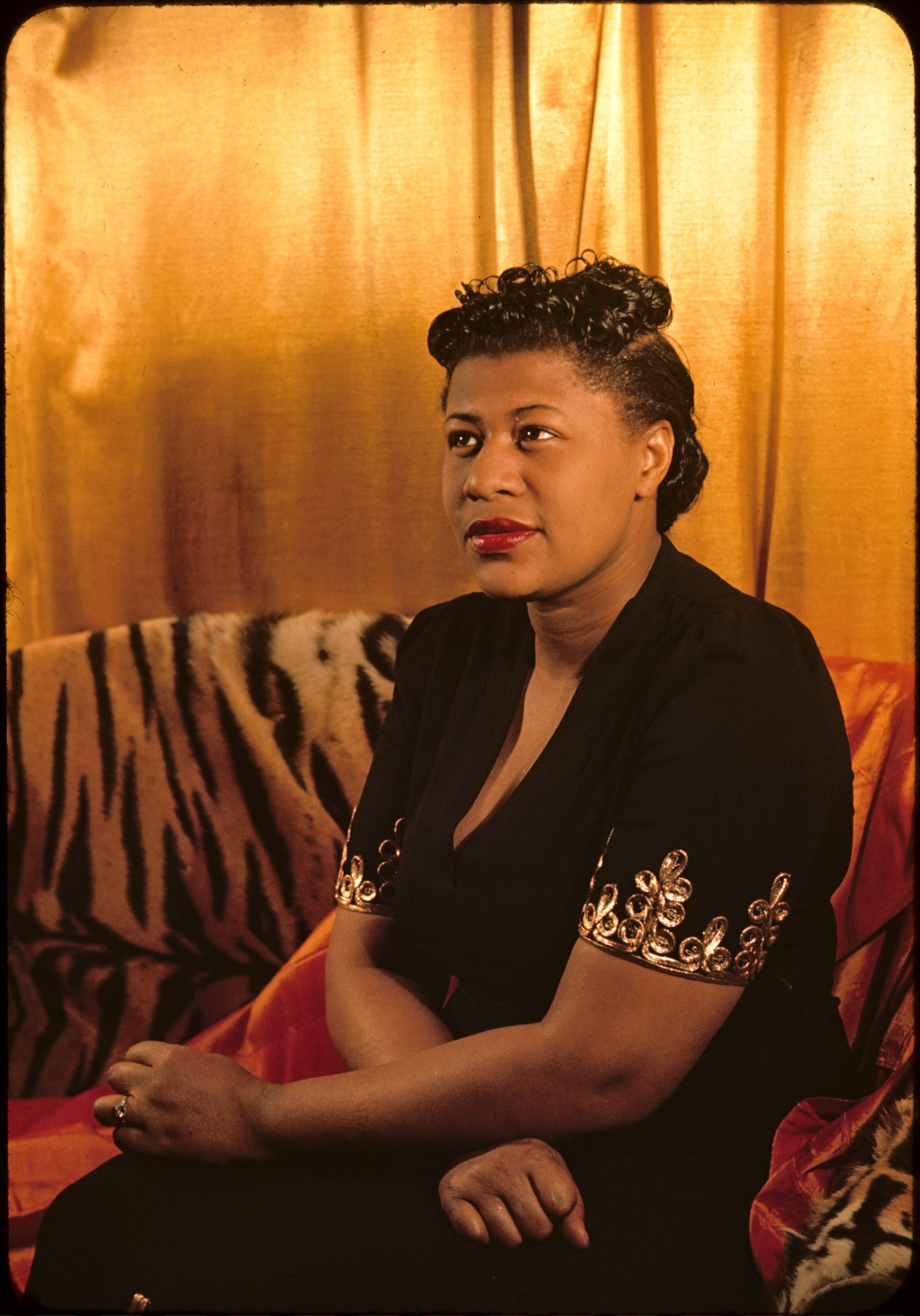
Ella Fitzgerald photographed by Carl Van Vechten in 1940.

Women's Skiing Fashions, Mount Kosciuszko, New South Wales, 1940

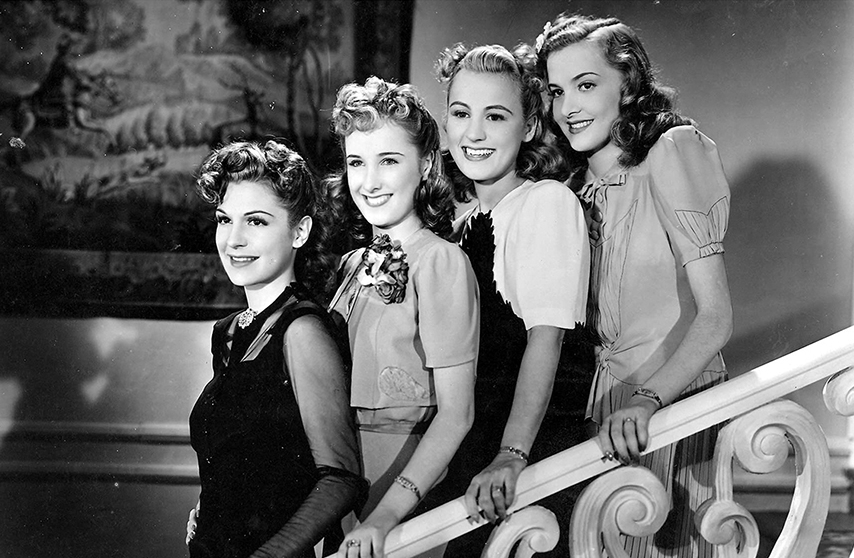
Zully Moreno, Mirtha Legrand, Nury Montsé and Silvana Roth in Los martes, orquídeas (1941).

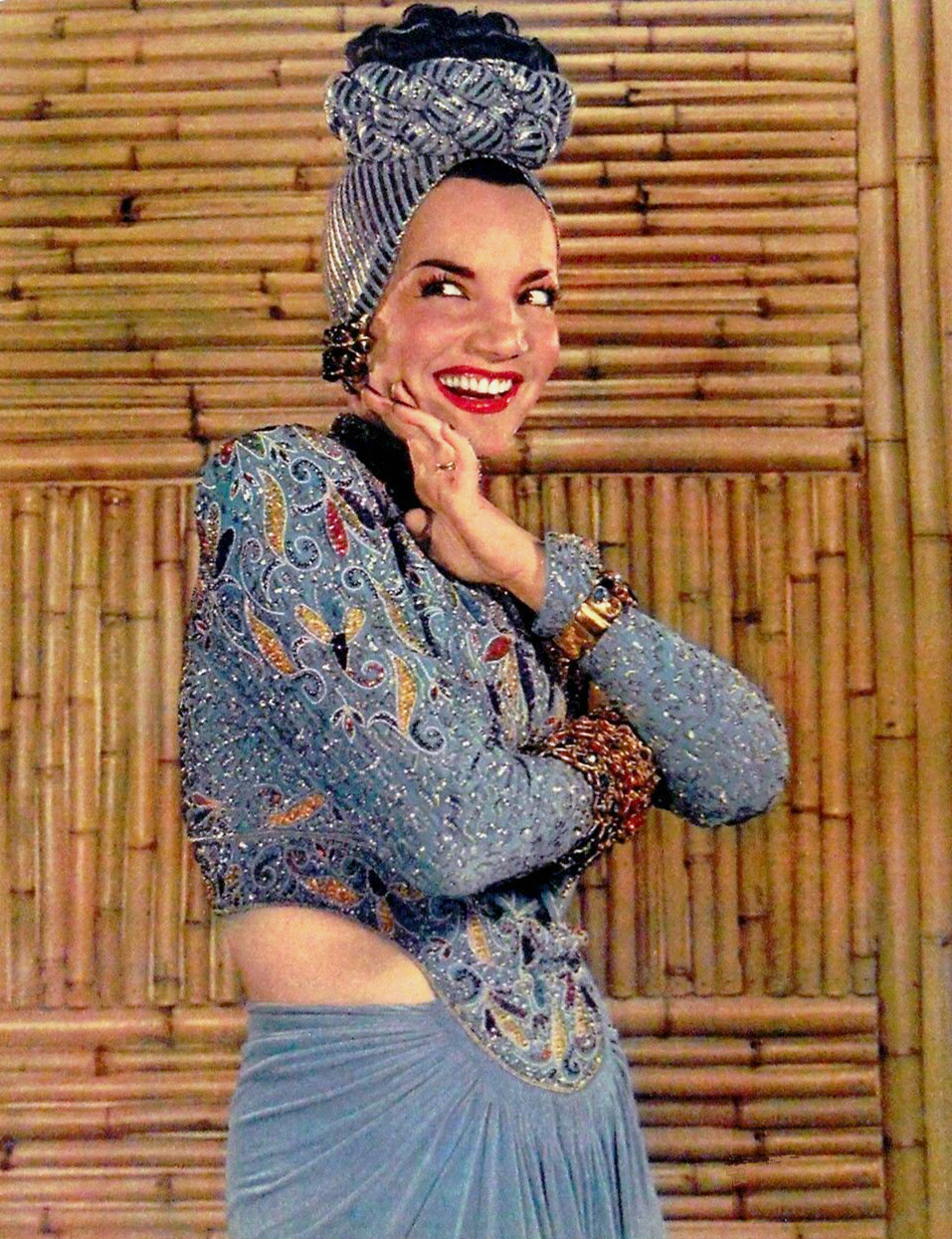
Carmen Miranda in a publicity still, 1941.

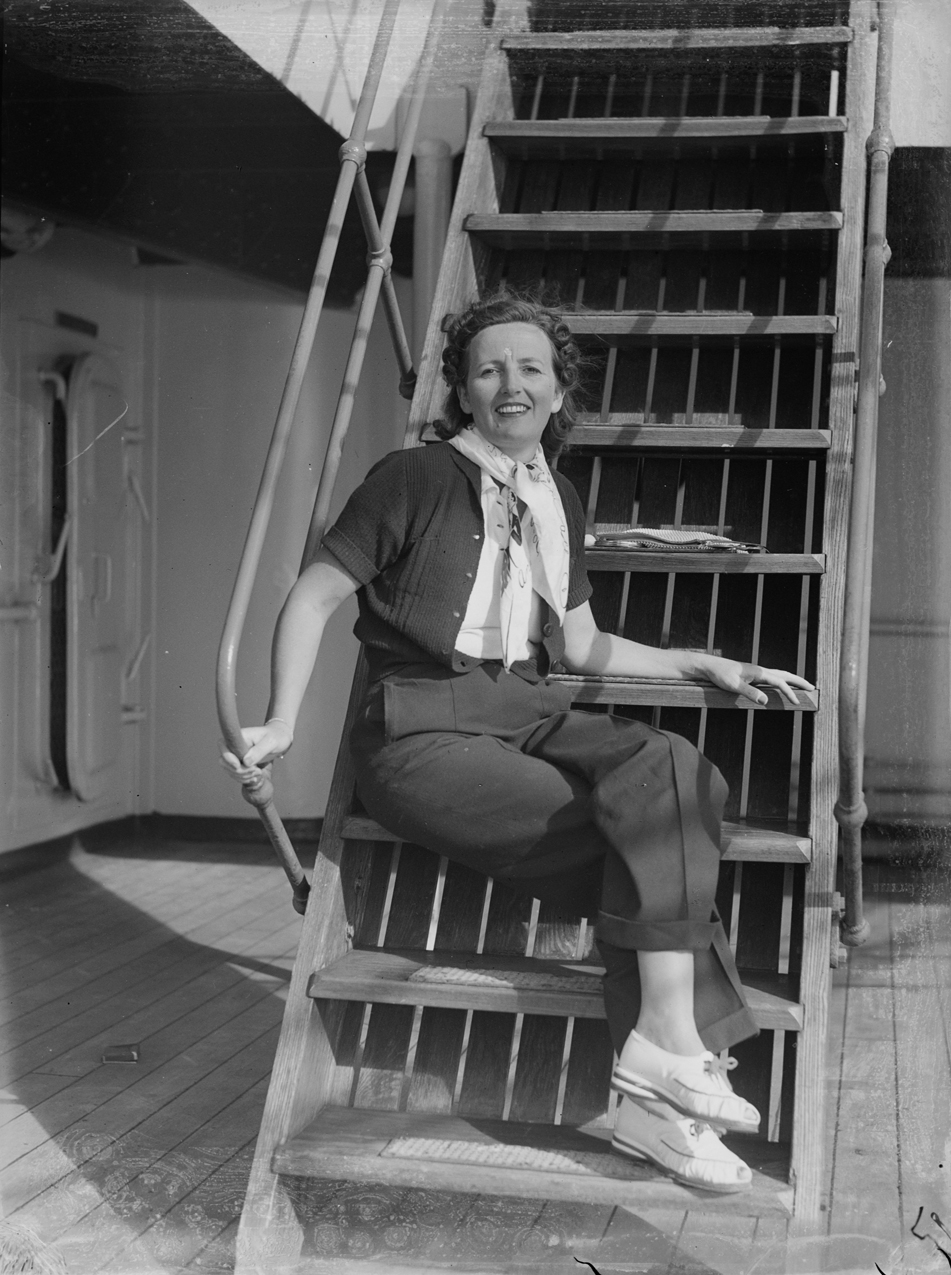
A woman seated on the steps of a ship in Australia, 1942.

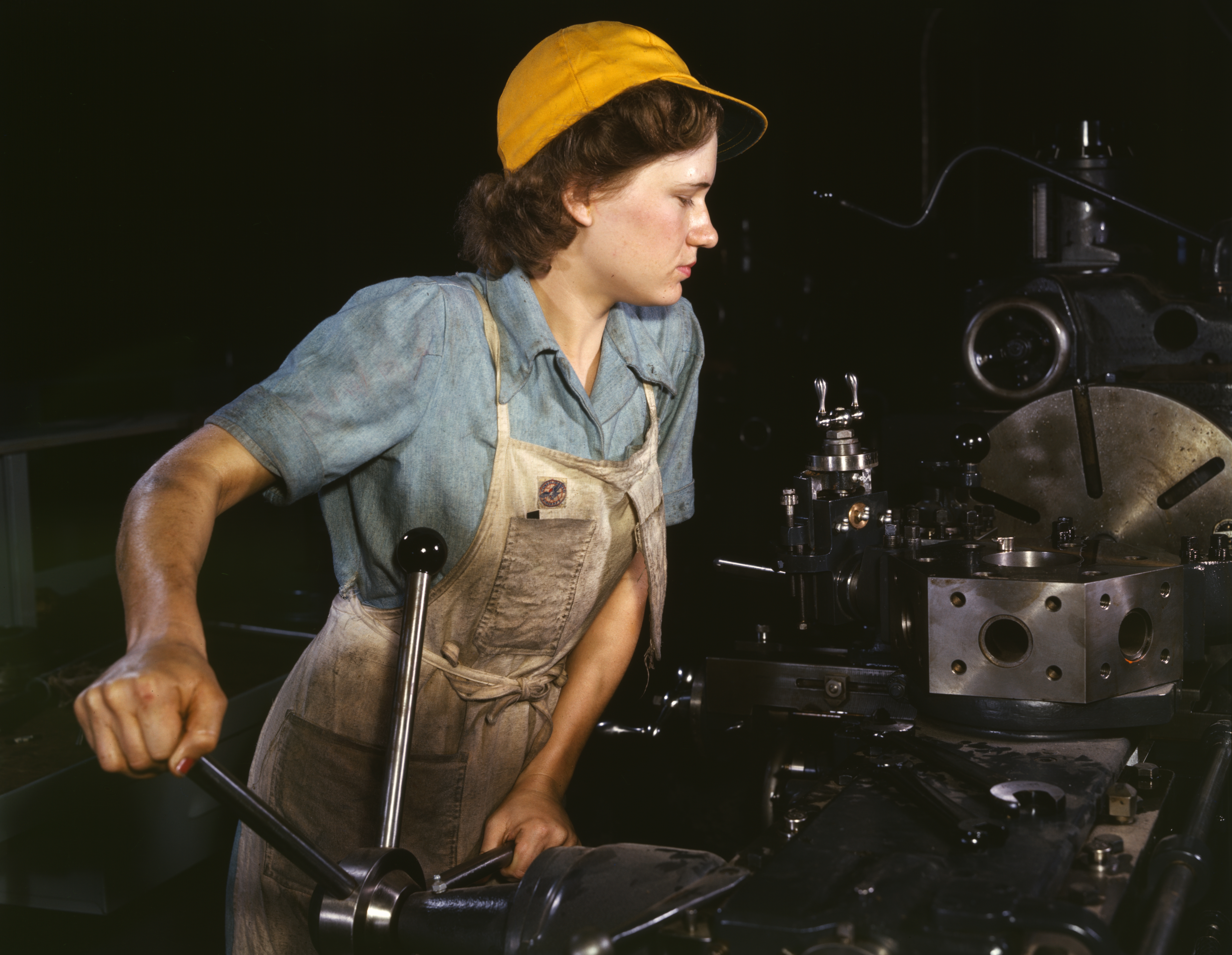
A factory worker at the Consolidated Aircraft Corporation plant in Fort Worth, 1942

Fashion in wartime, Australia, 1942

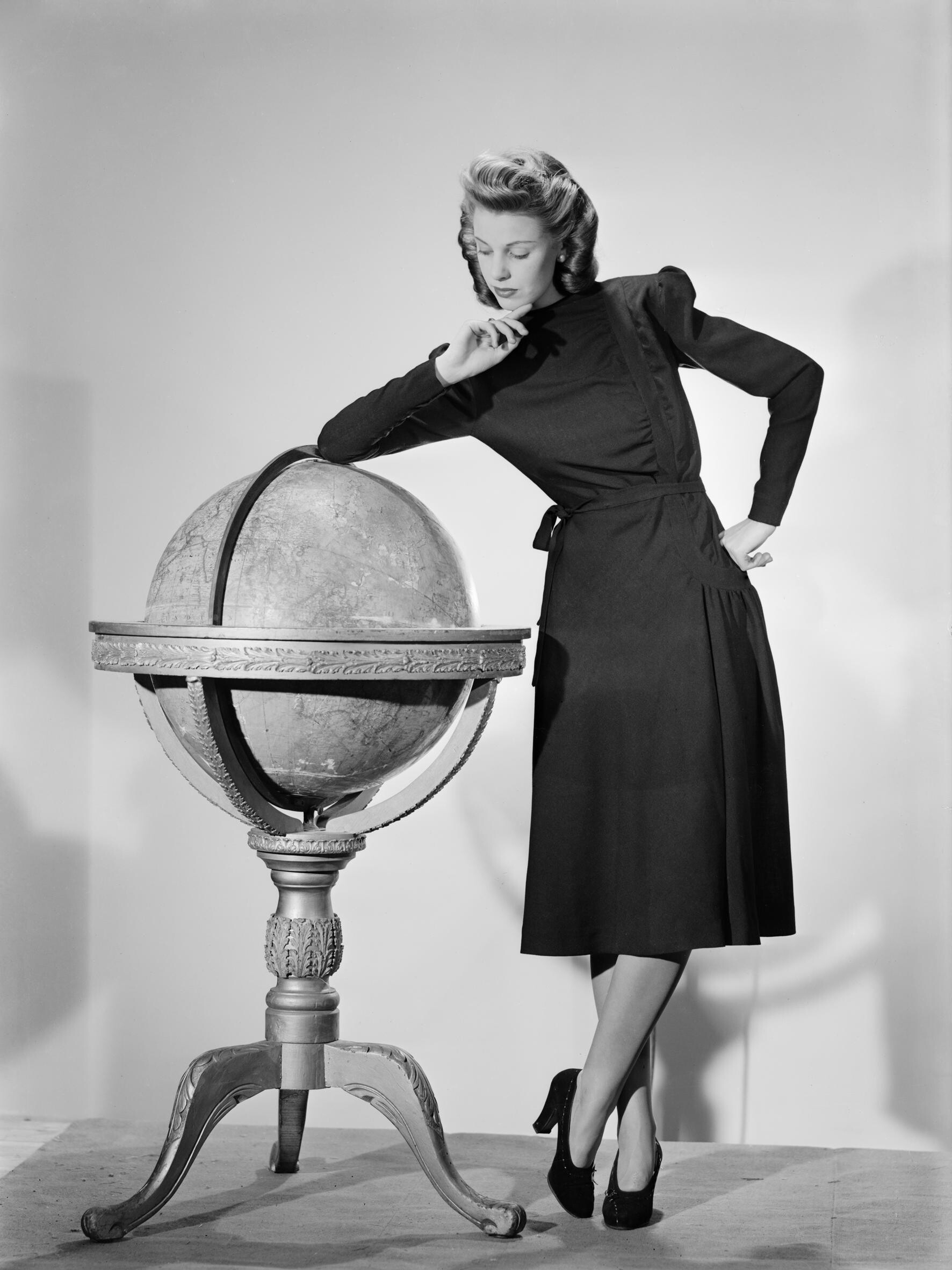
A model wearing a black woollen Utility Atrima dress in 1943.

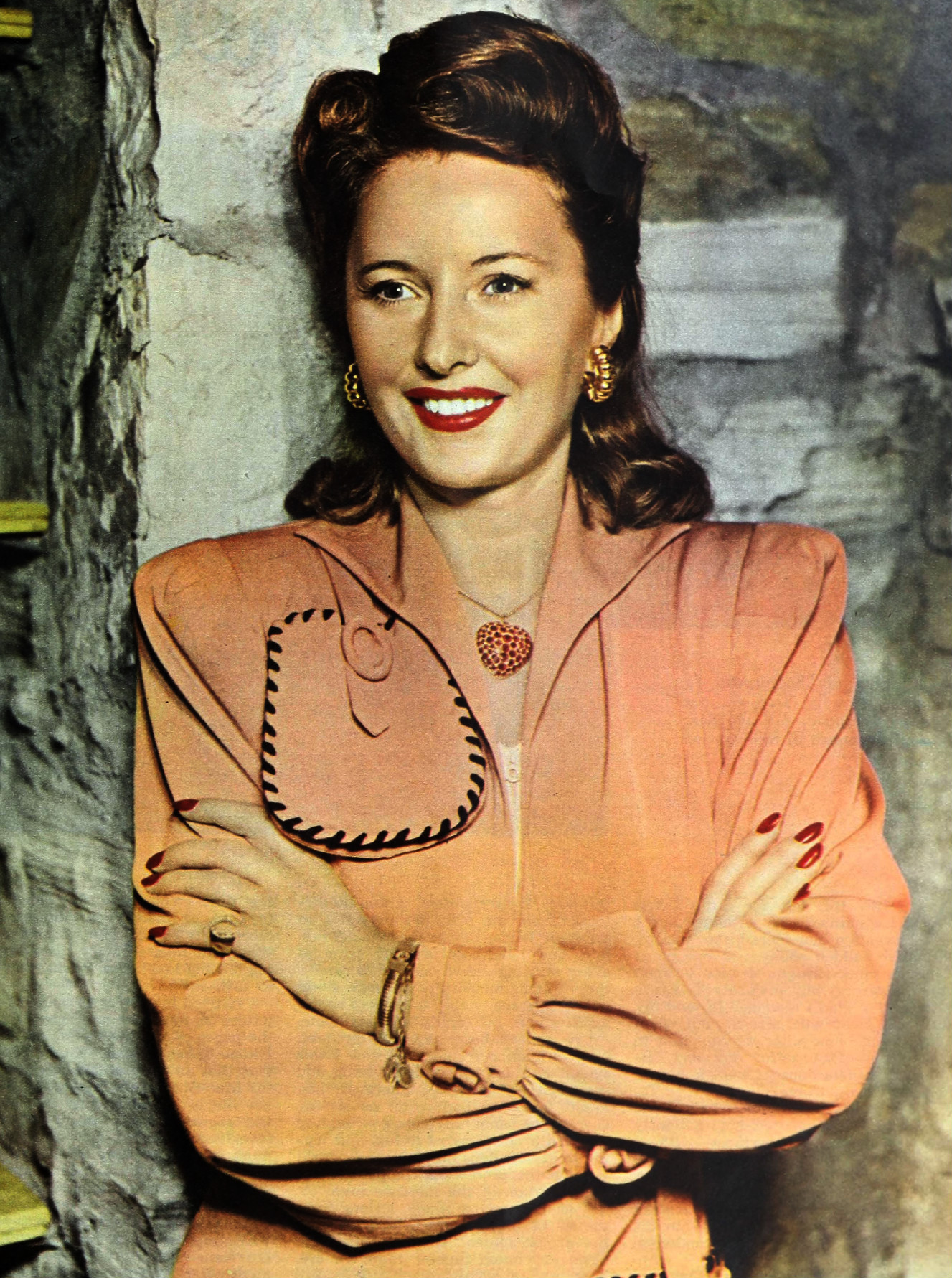
Barbara Stanwyck in a publicity still, 1943.

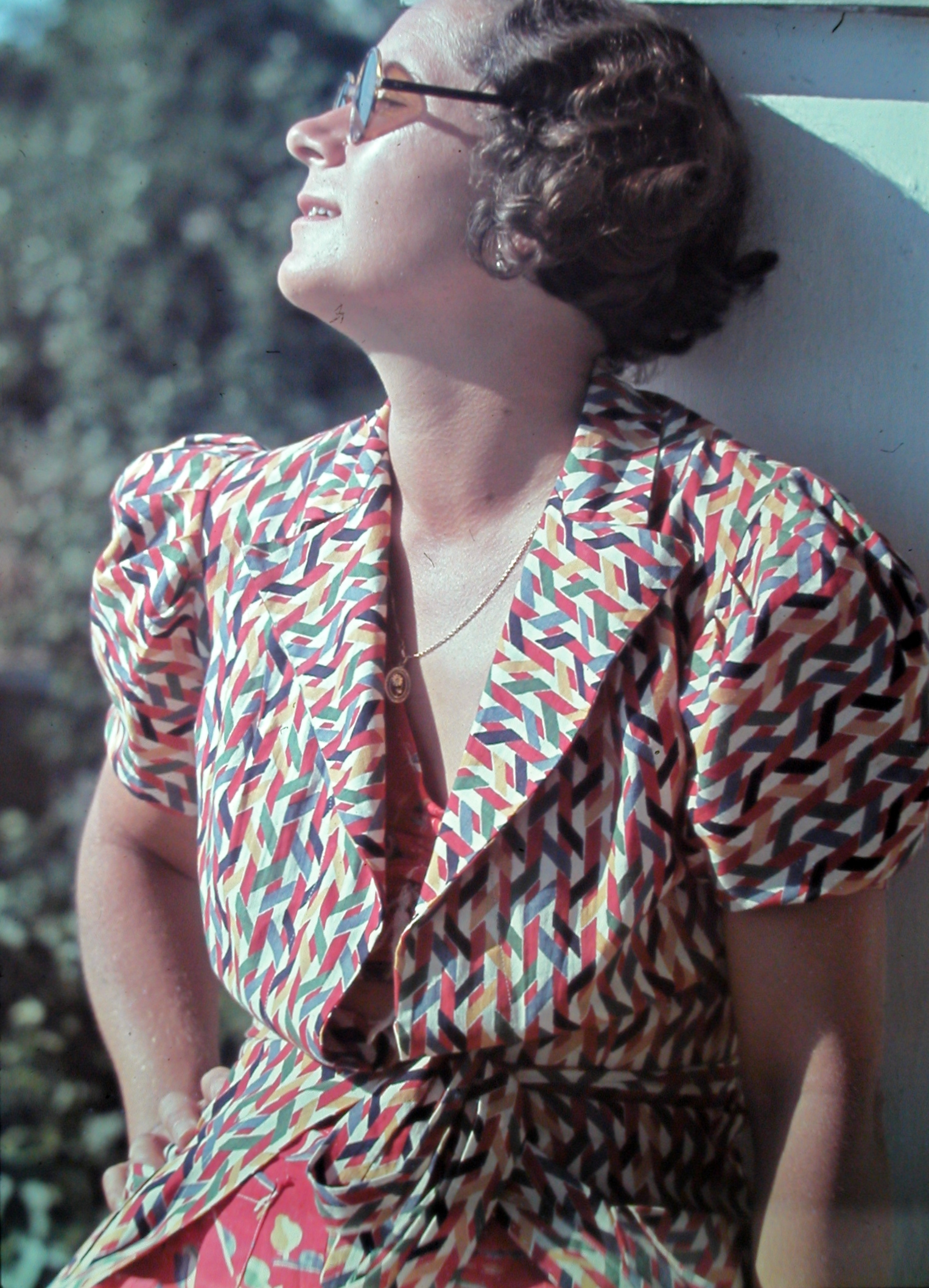
Hungarian woman in 1943.

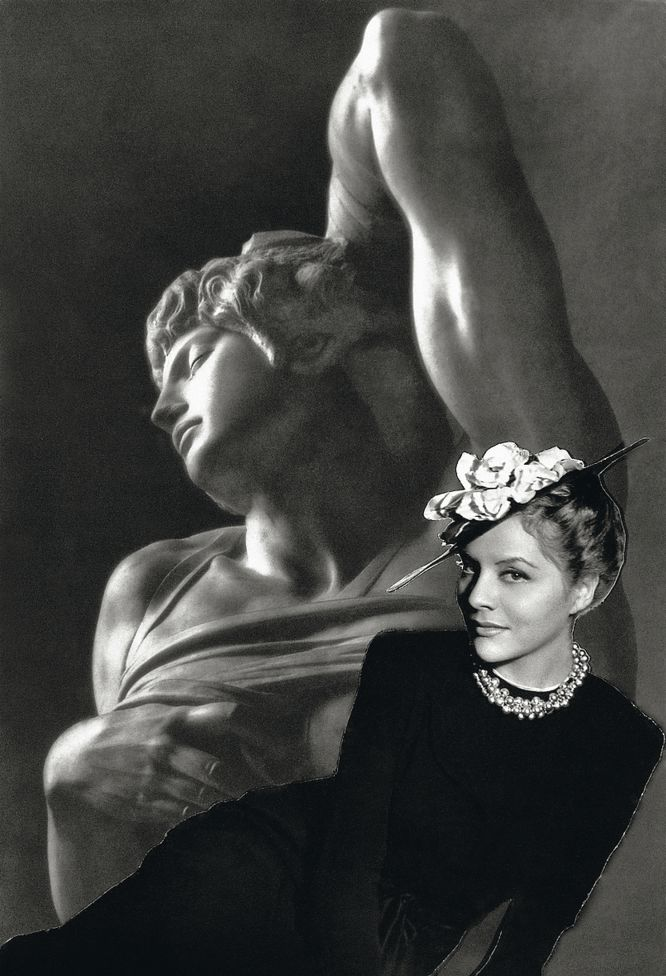
Photomontage portrait of Amelia Bence by Annemarie Heinrich, 1943.

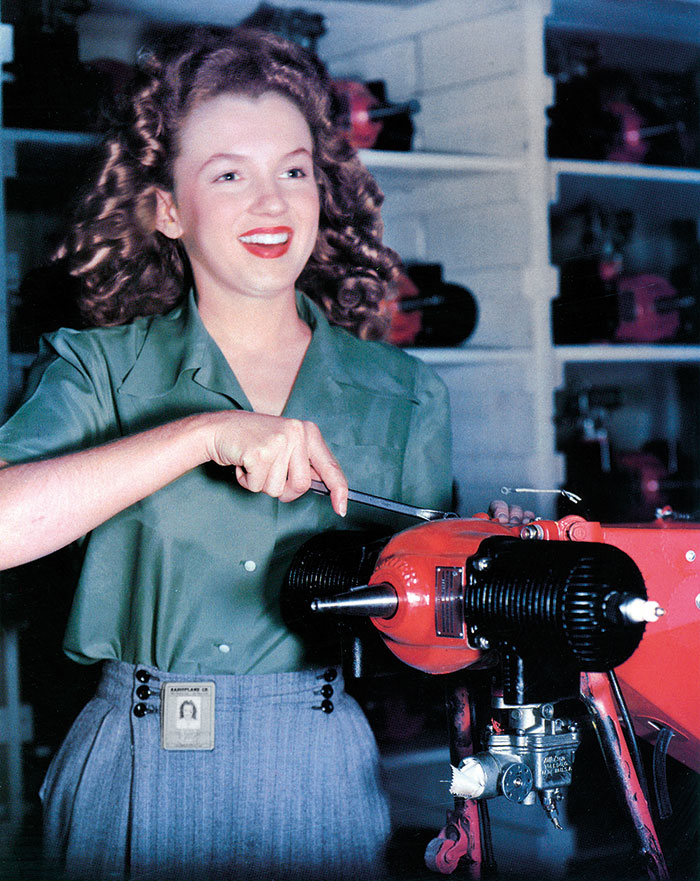
Marilyn Monroe working in a factory at the height of World War II, 1944.

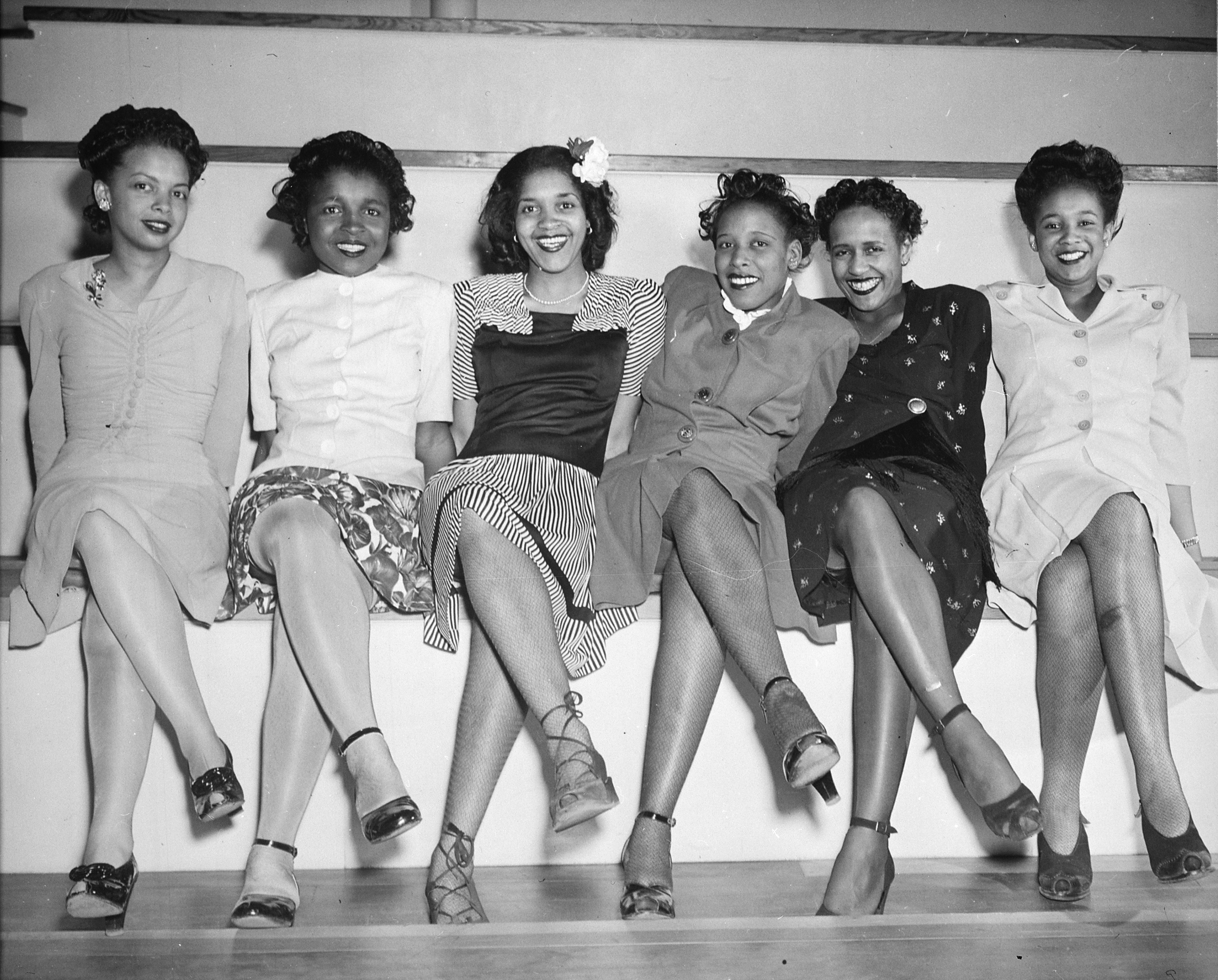
Pin-up girls at NAS Seattle, April 1944.

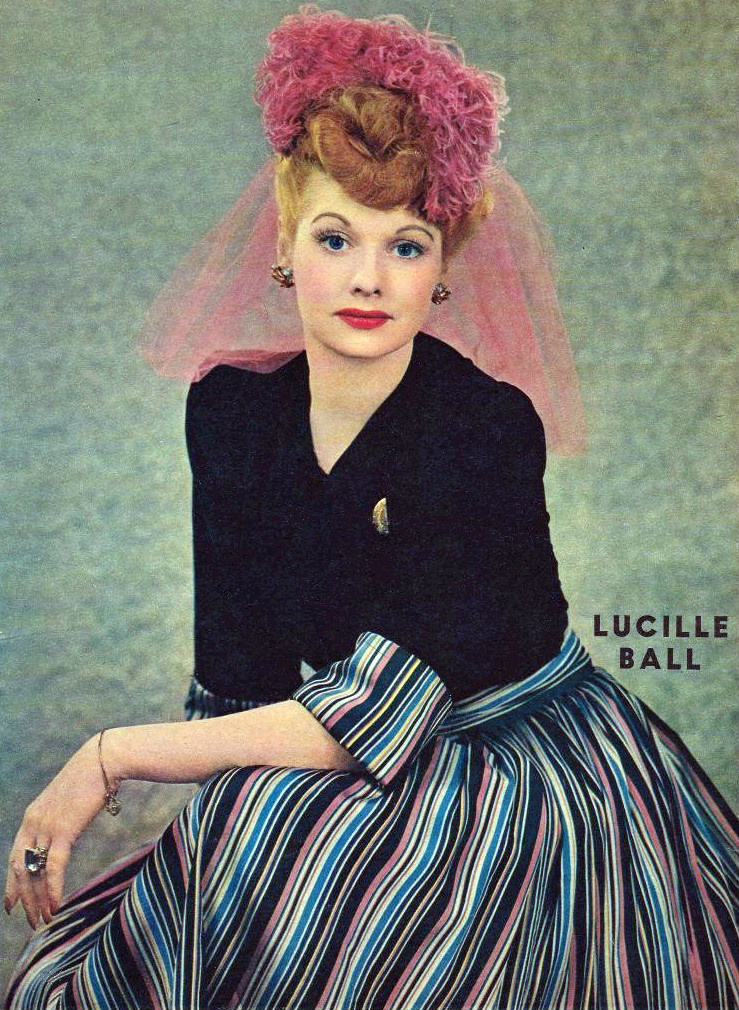
Lucille Ball in a publicity still, 1944.

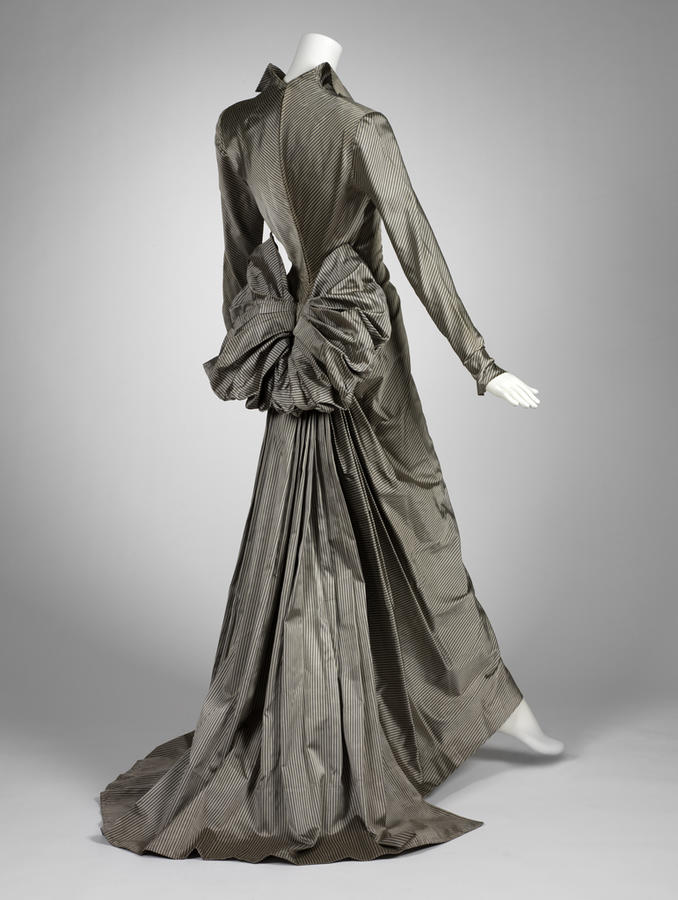
A taffeta evening dress with bustle bow designed by Eta Hentz in 1945.

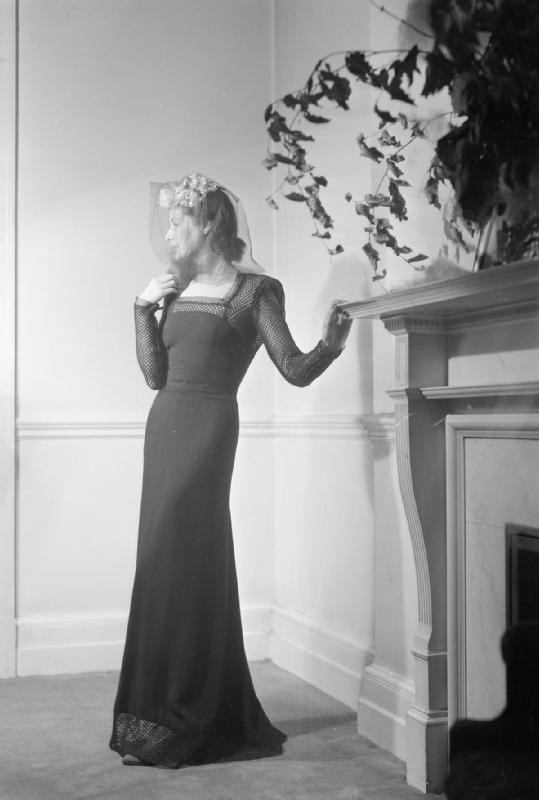
A model wear a black dinner frock by Peter Russell, member of the Incorporated Society of London Fashion Designers, 1945.

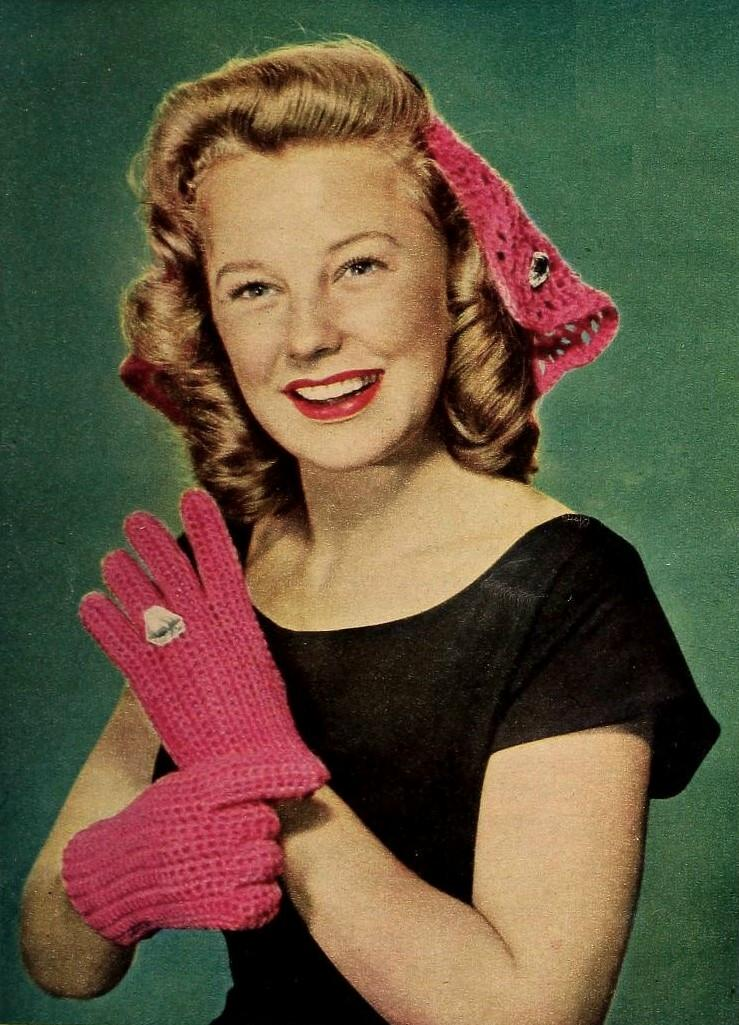
June Allyson modelling coif and gloves by Greta Plattry, 1945.

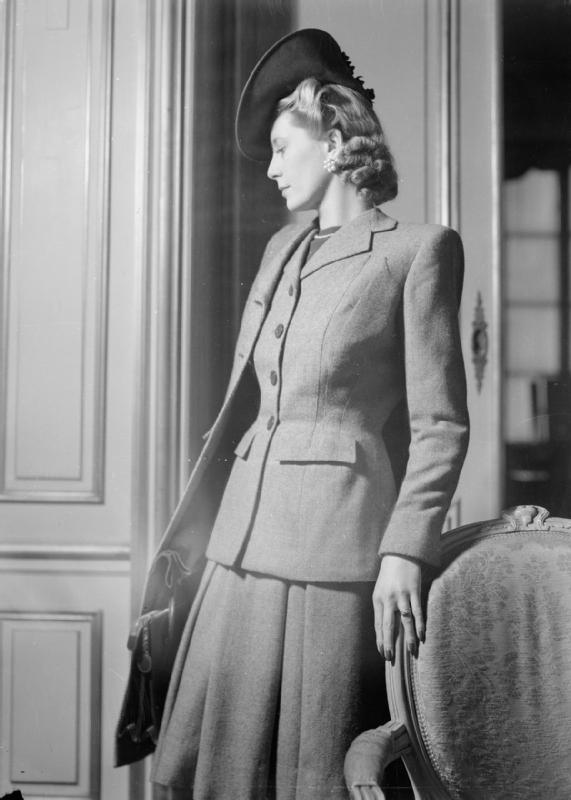
A model wears a brown and beige all-wool checked suit by Hardy Amies, member of the Incorporated Society of London Fashion Designers, 1945

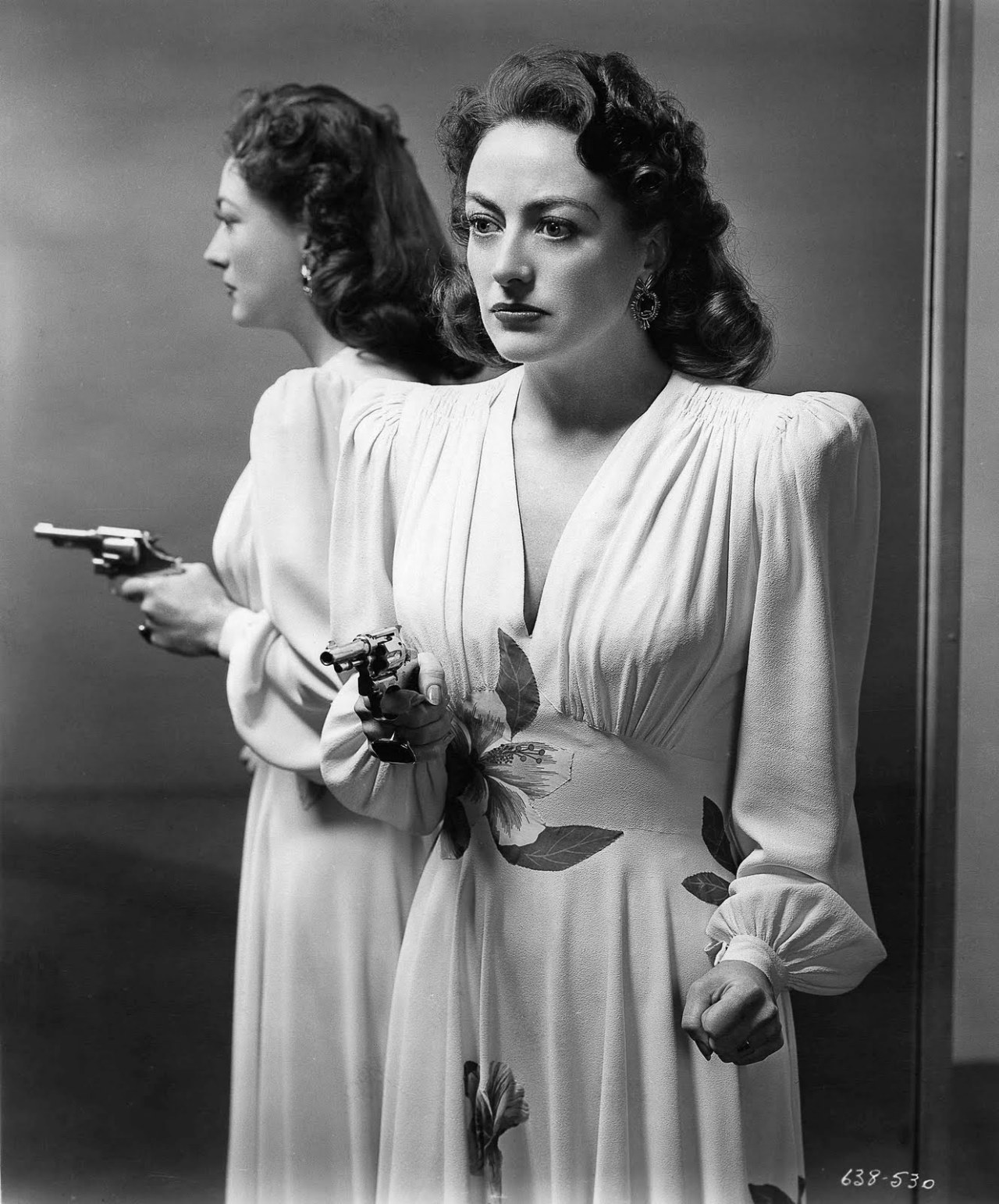
Joan Crawford in Mildred Pierce (1945).

=== Style gallery: Women's fashion, 1946–1949 ===
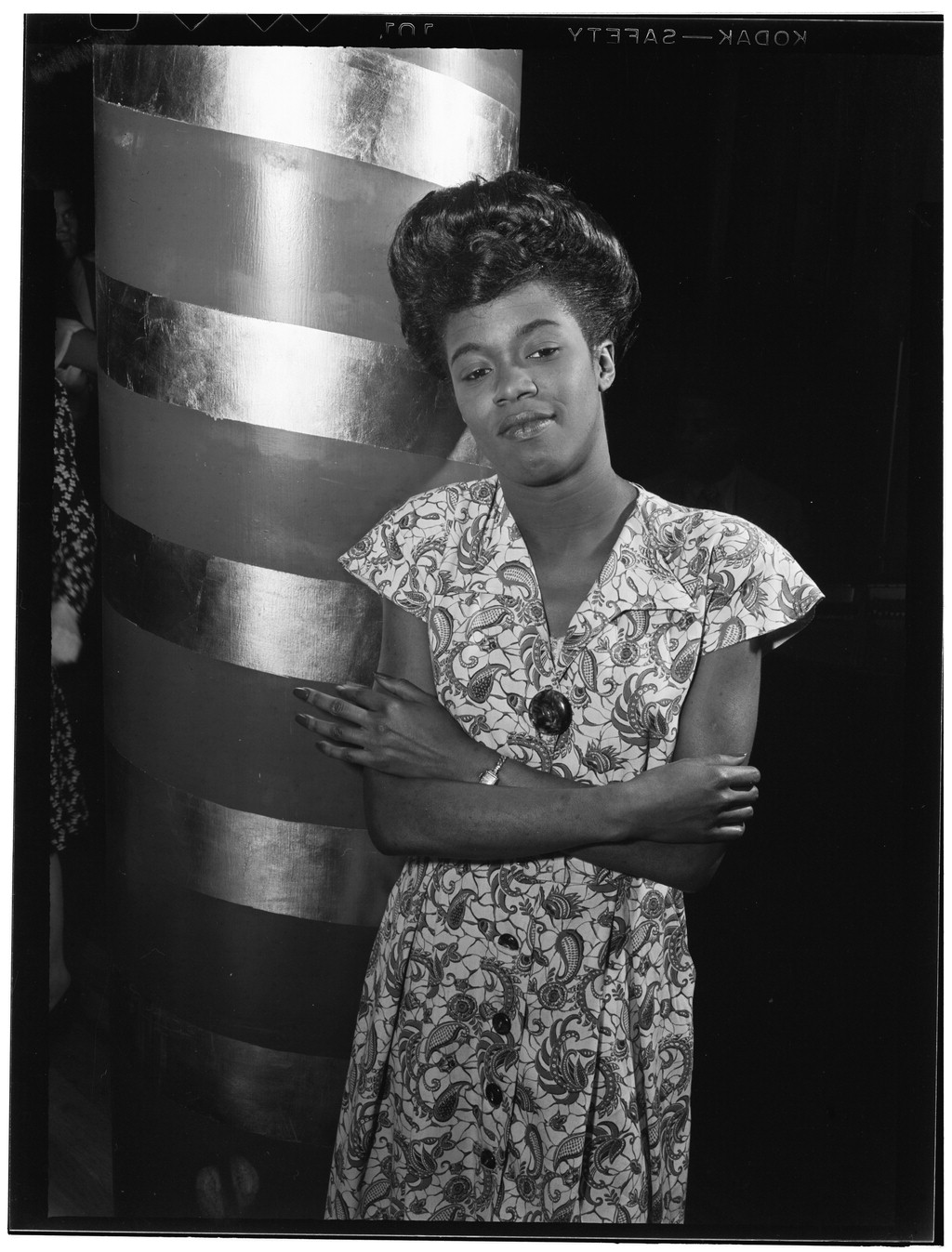
Sarah Vaughan in New York City, 1946.

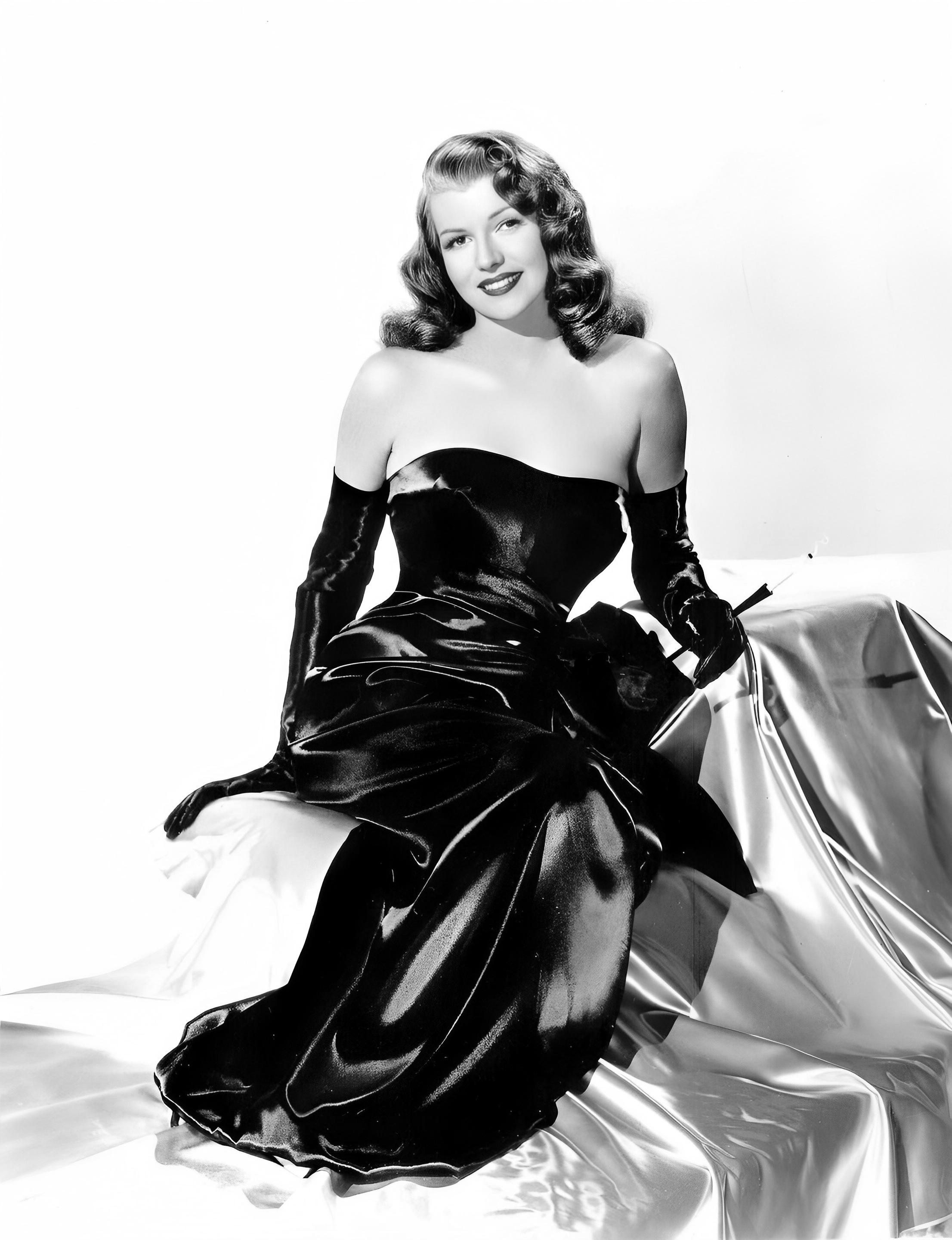
Glamour icon Rita Hayworth in a black gown designed by Jean Louis for Gilda (1946).

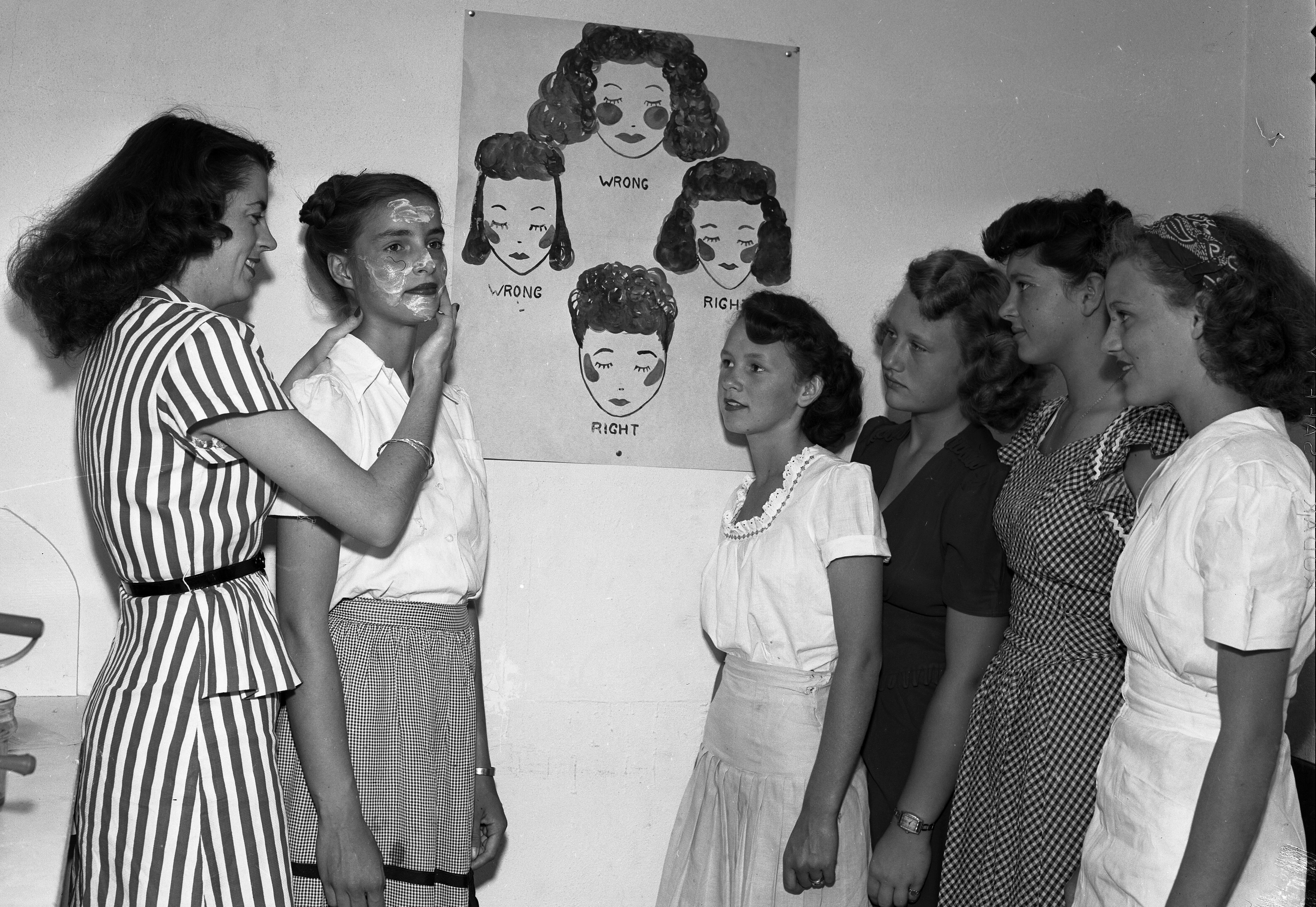
A cosmetology class in Arvin, California, 1946.

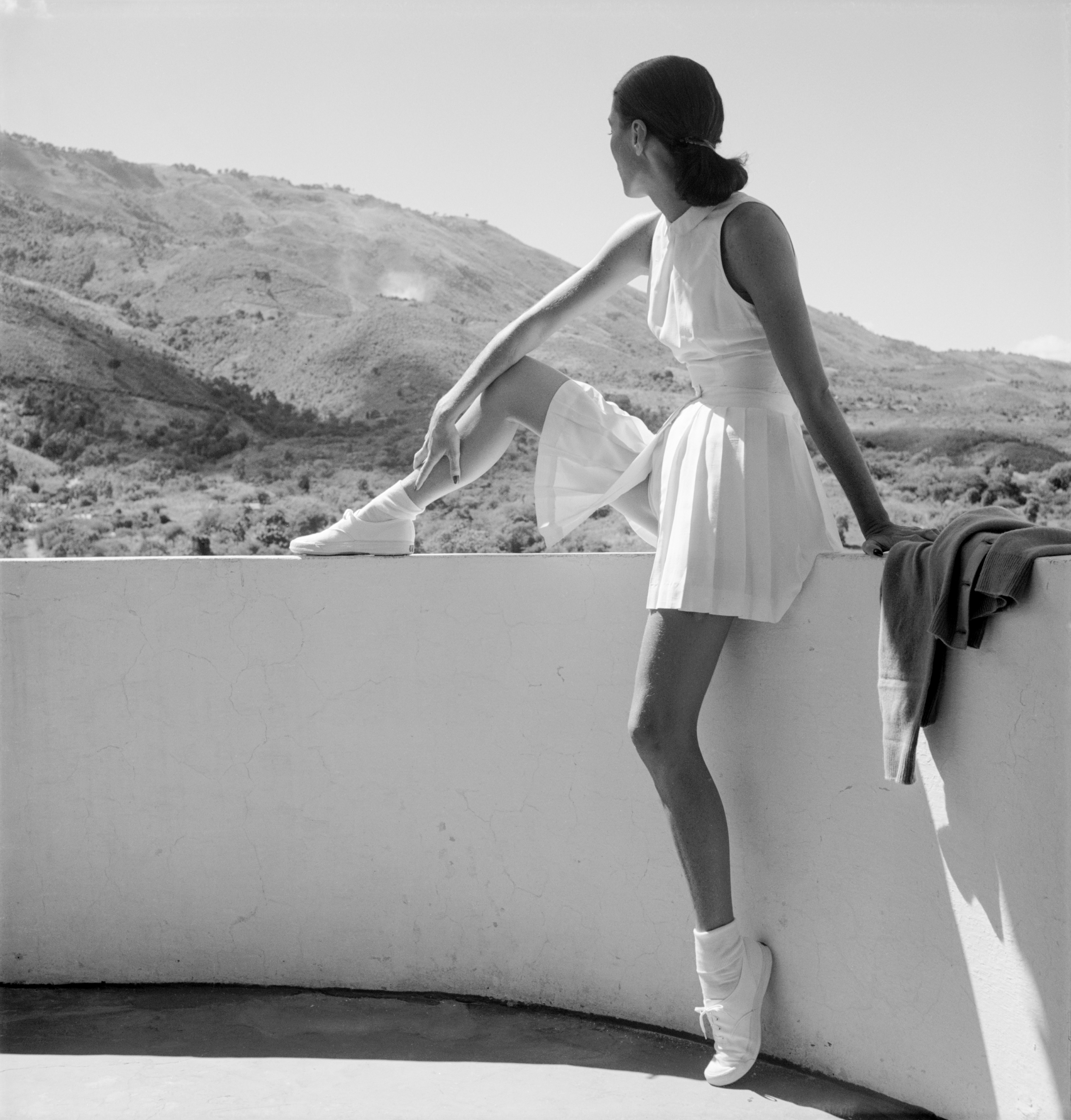
A woman in a tennis outfit, photographed by Toni Frissell, 1947.

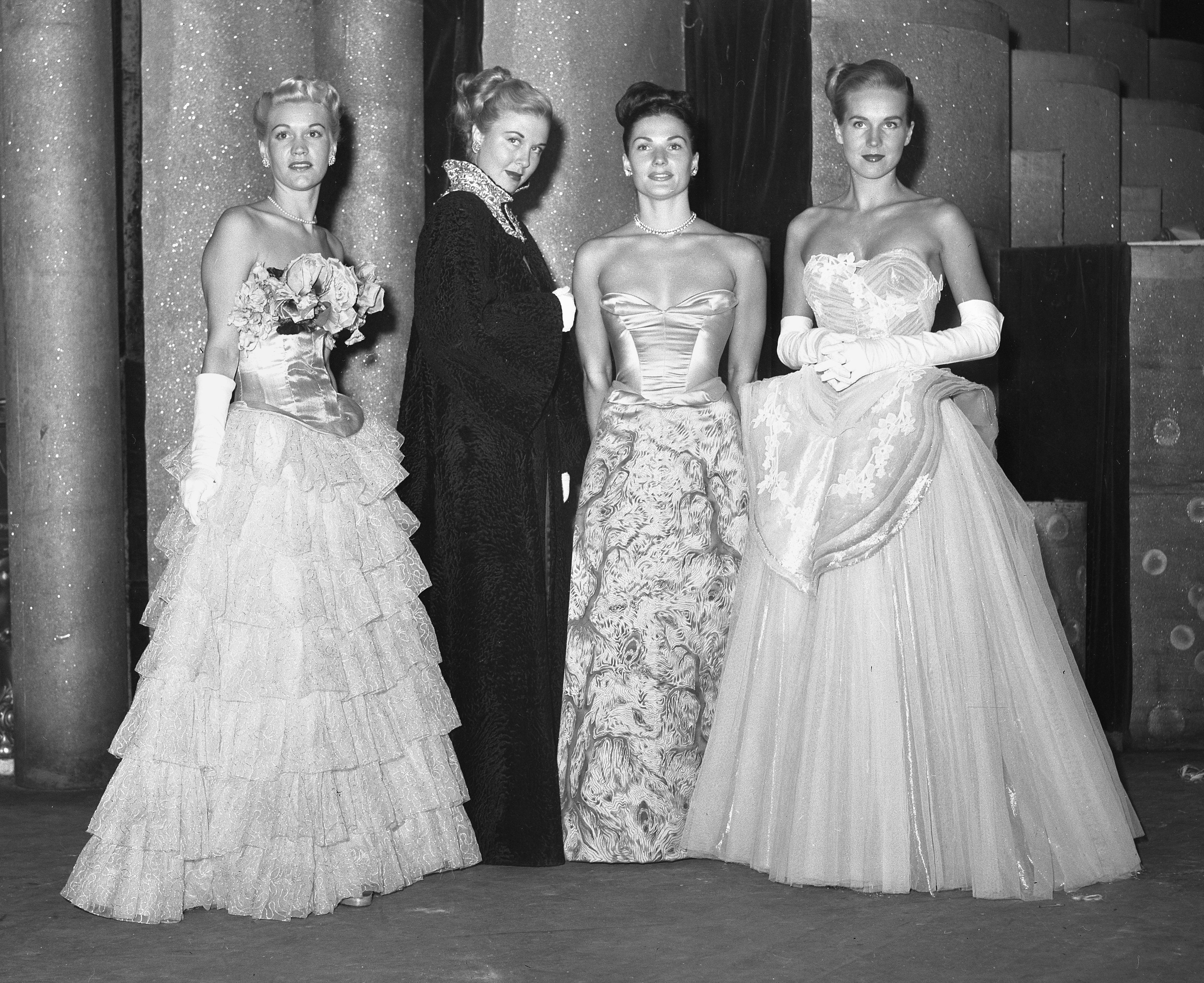
Evening gowns by Dorothy O'Hara, Orry-Kelly, Al Teitelbaum and Howard Greer in Los Angeles, 1947.

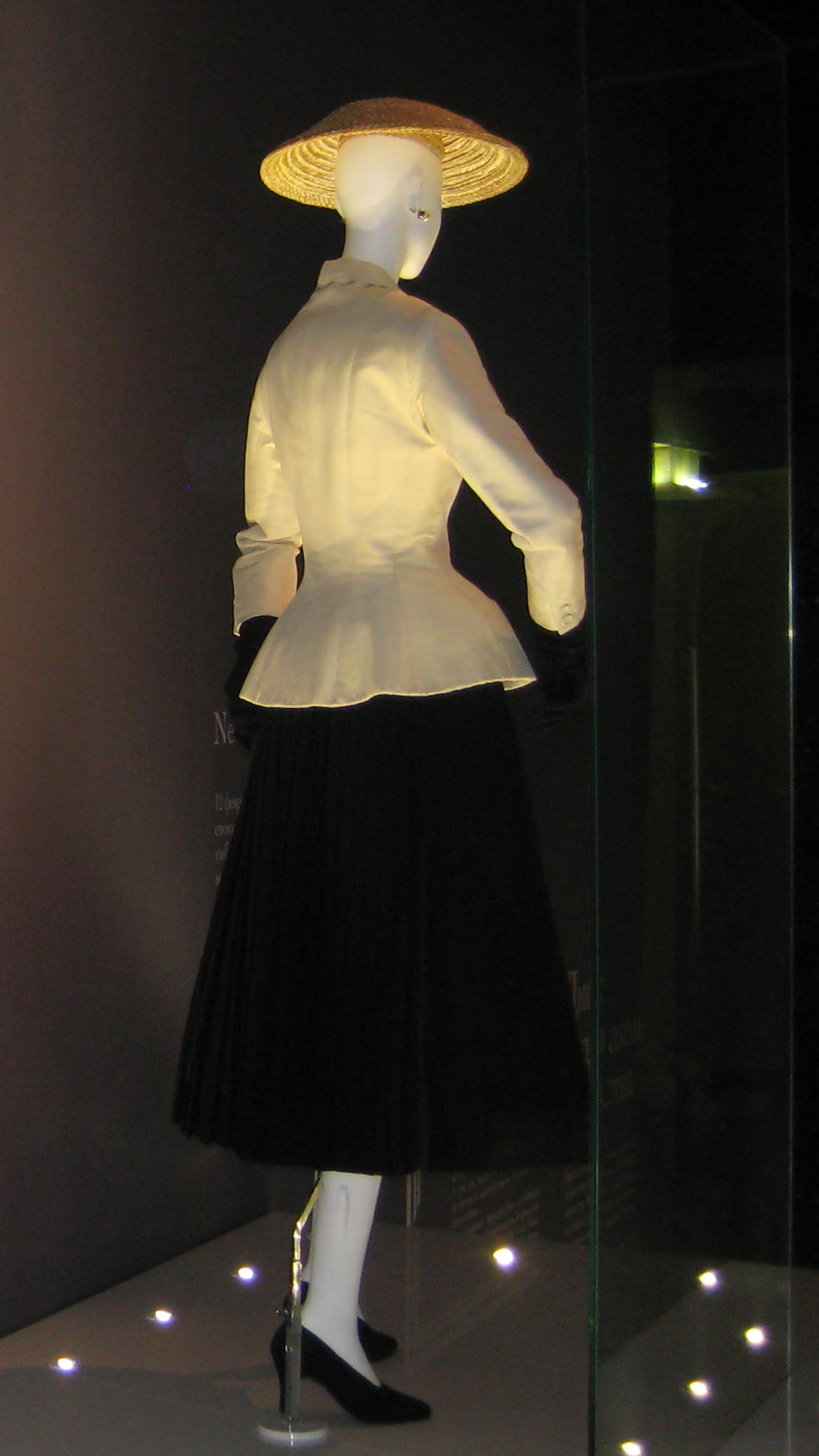
A Dior dress from his highly influential 1947 "New Look" collection.

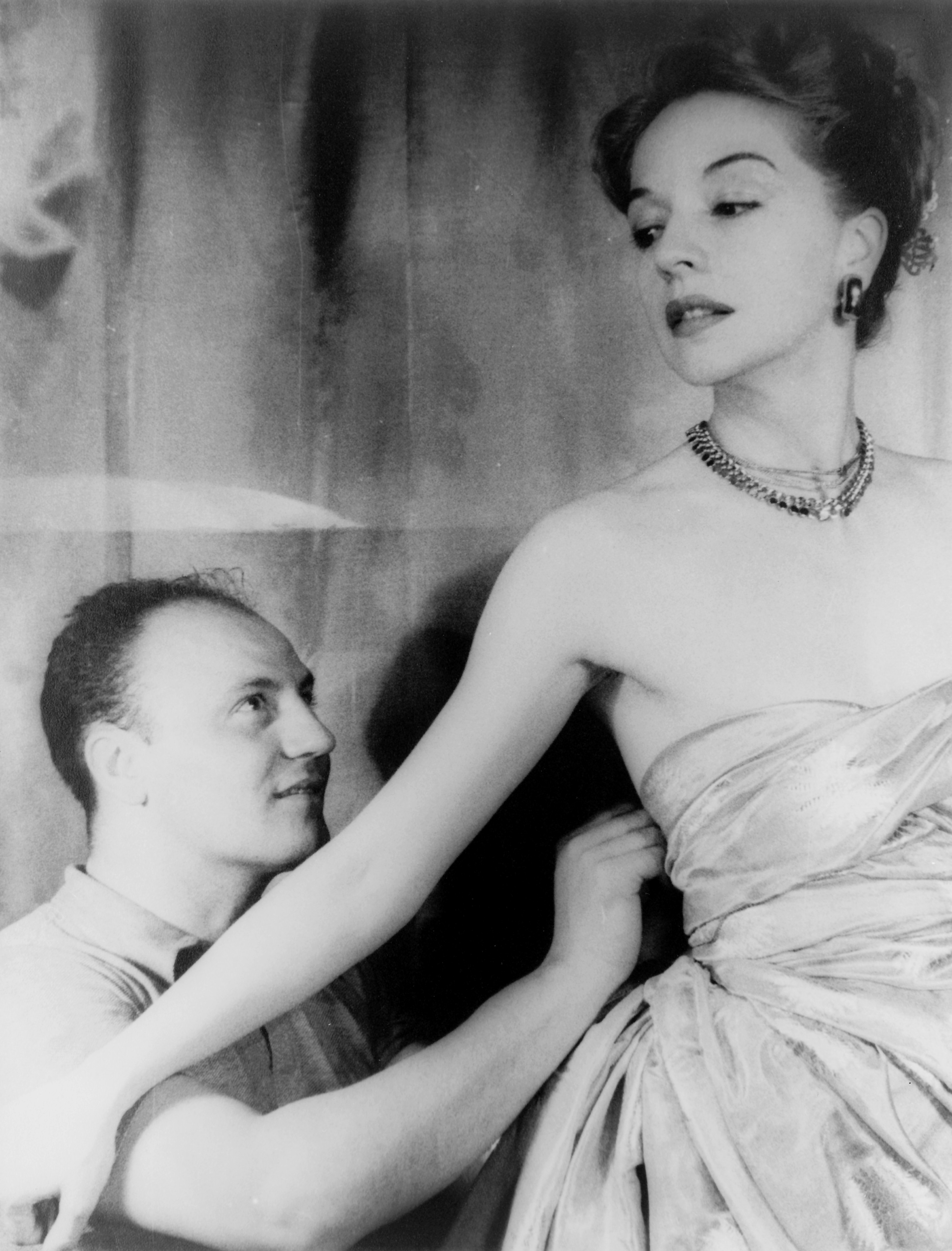
Pierre Balmain and Ruth Ford photographed by Carl Van Vechten, 1947.

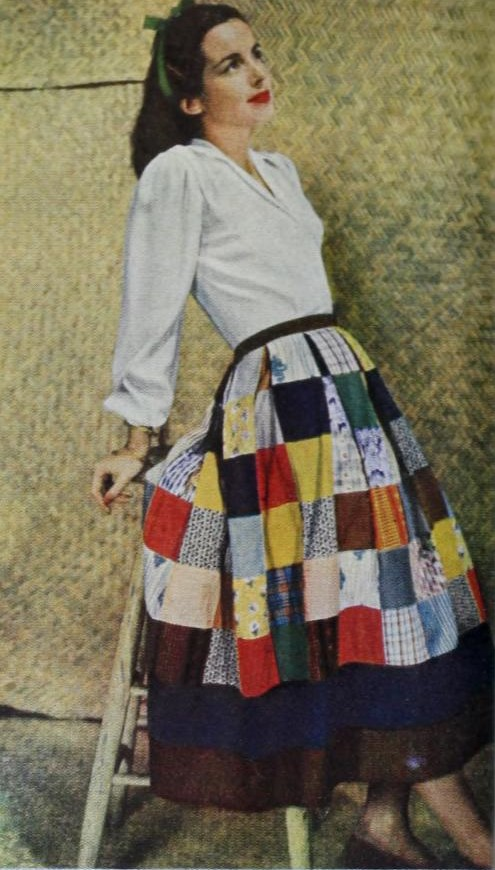
A patchwork skirt by Tina Leser, 1948.

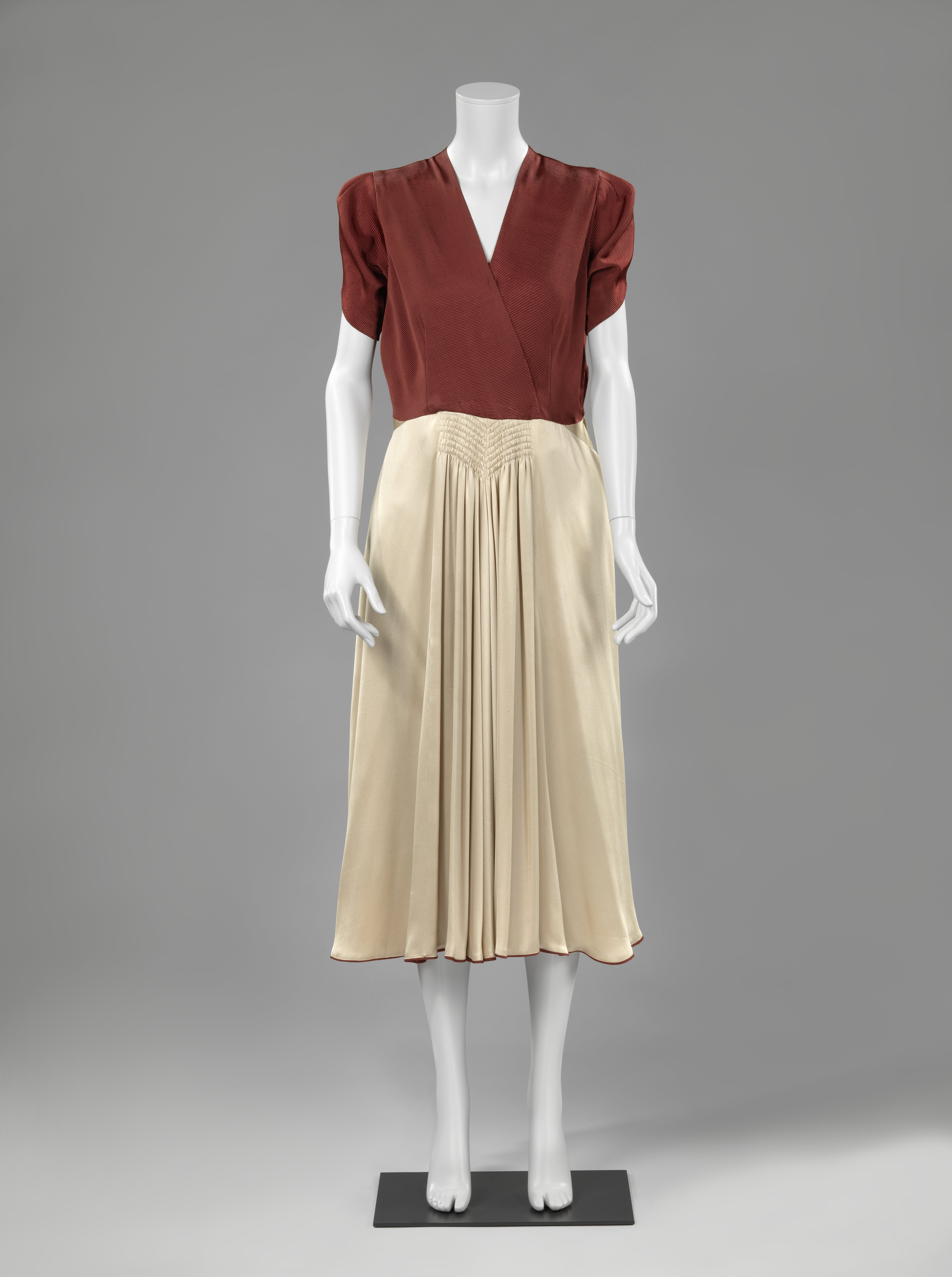
Outdoor dress with wine-red ribbed satin bodice and beige satin bell skirt, Netherlands, 1948.

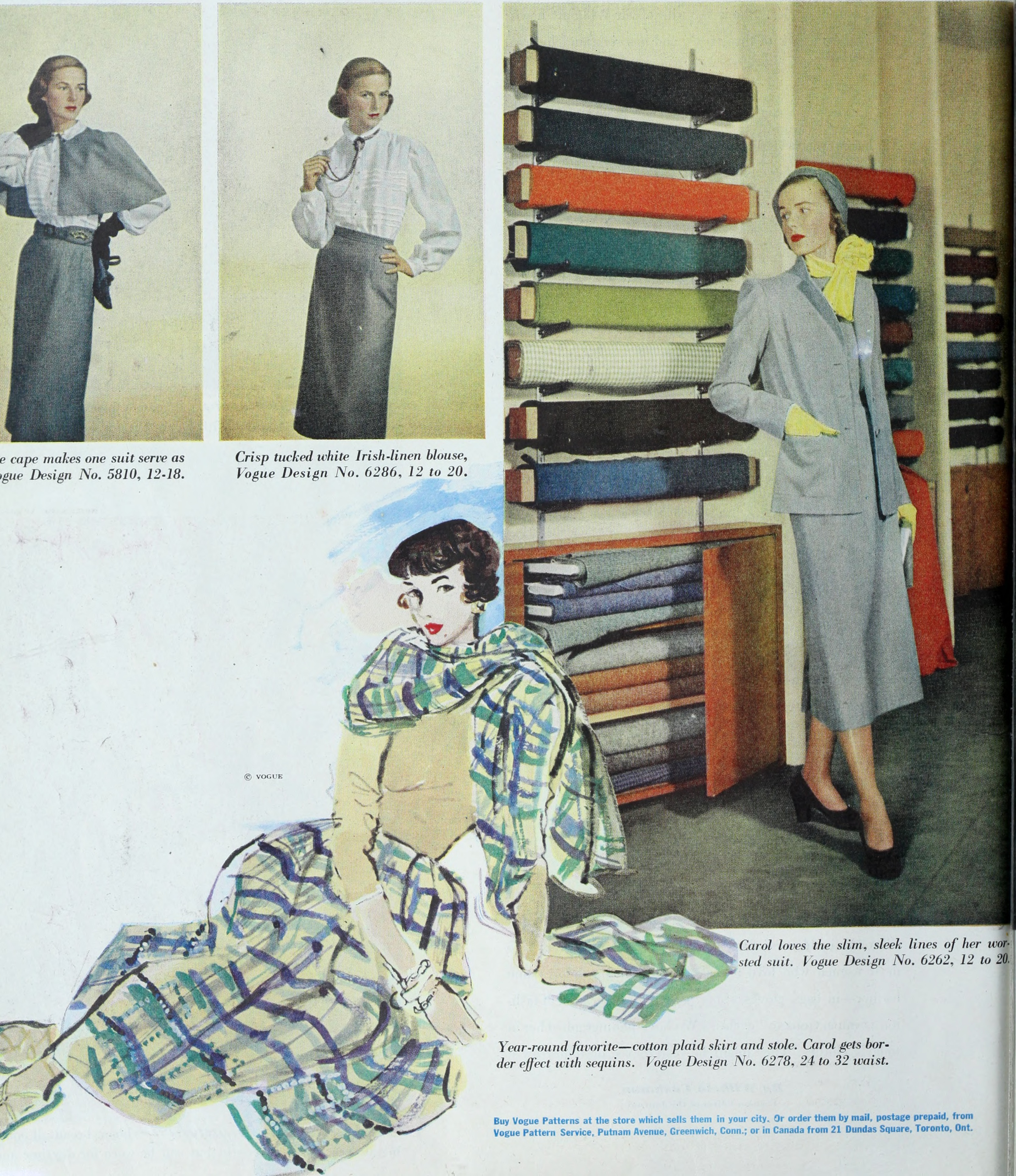
A page of the Ladies' Home Journal, 1948.

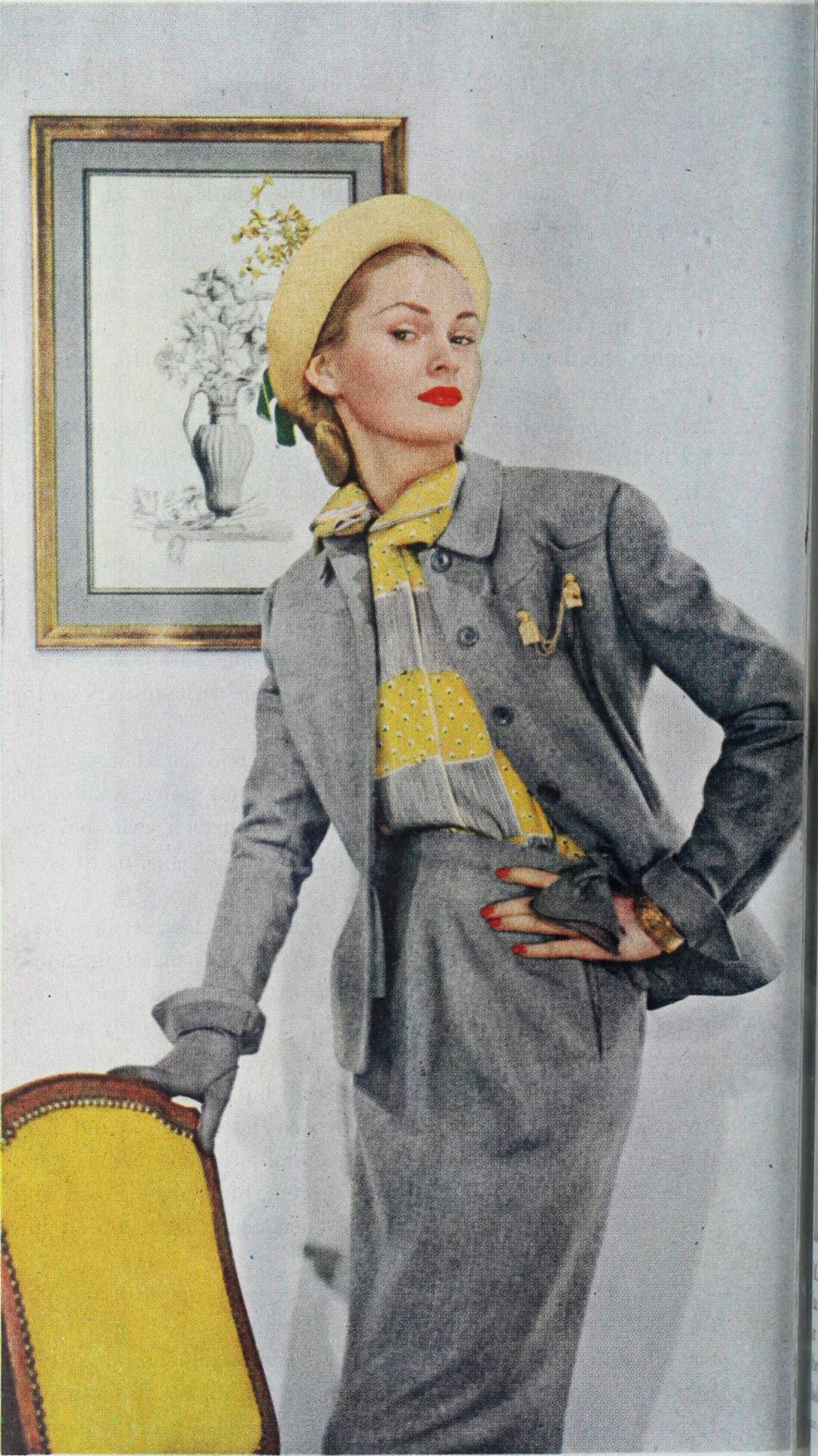
Suit, hat and blouse by Hattie Carnegie, 1948.

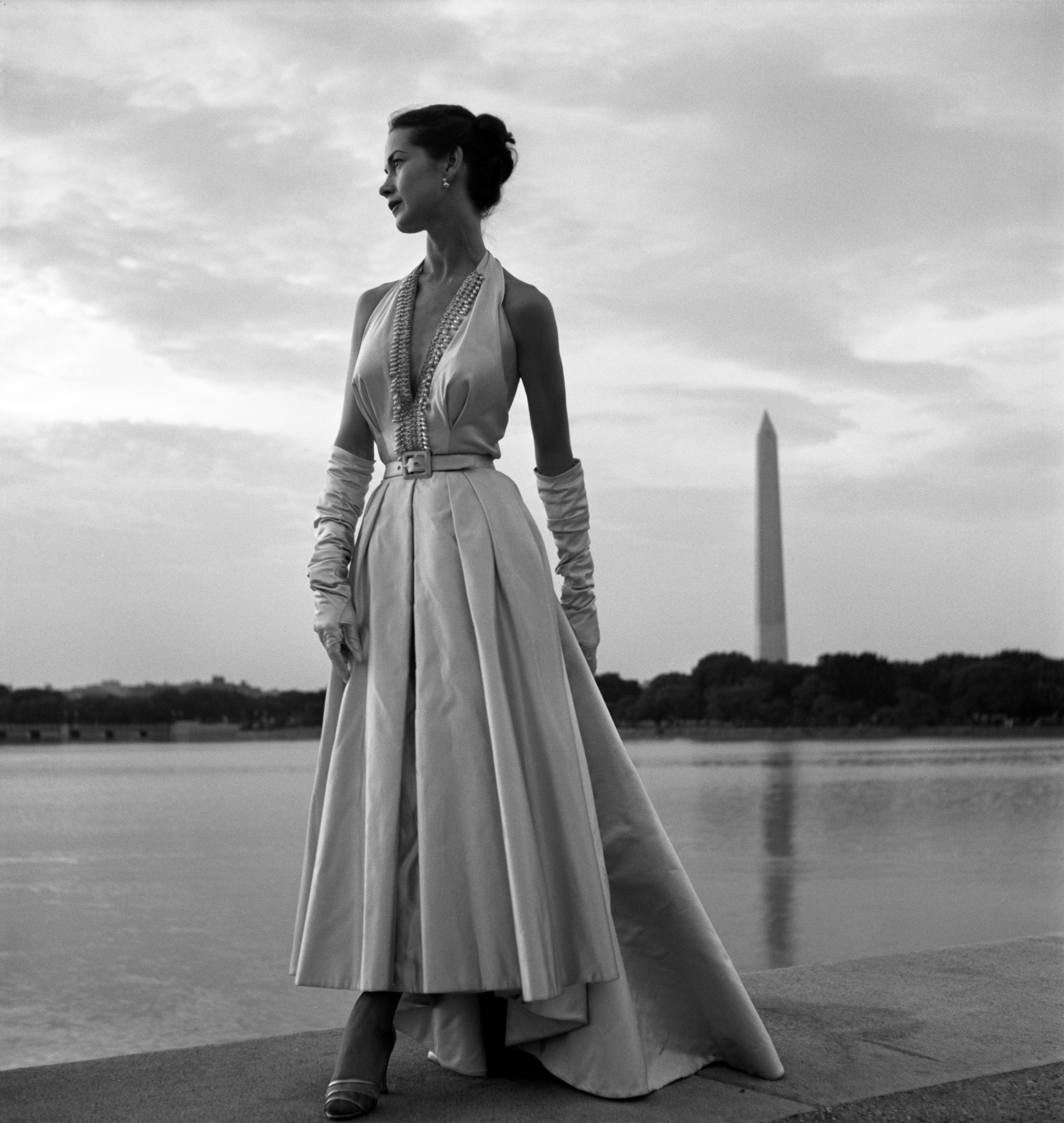
Fashion model posing in an evening gown on the steps of the Jefferson Memorial, photographed by Toni Frissell, 1949.

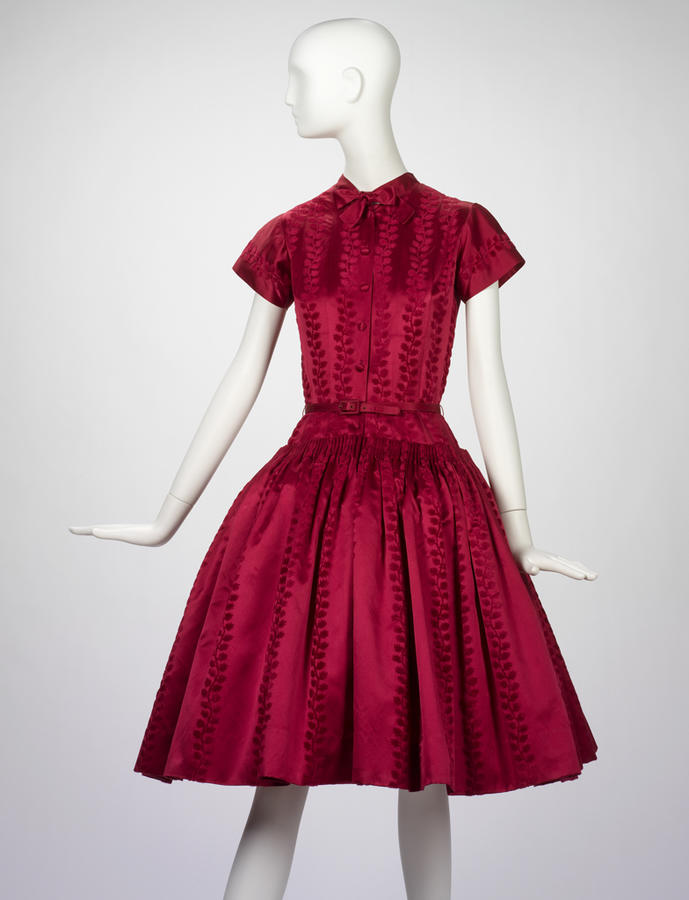
Red silk dress with pleated skirt by Norman Norell, 1949, anticipating the characteristic silhouette of the early 1950s.

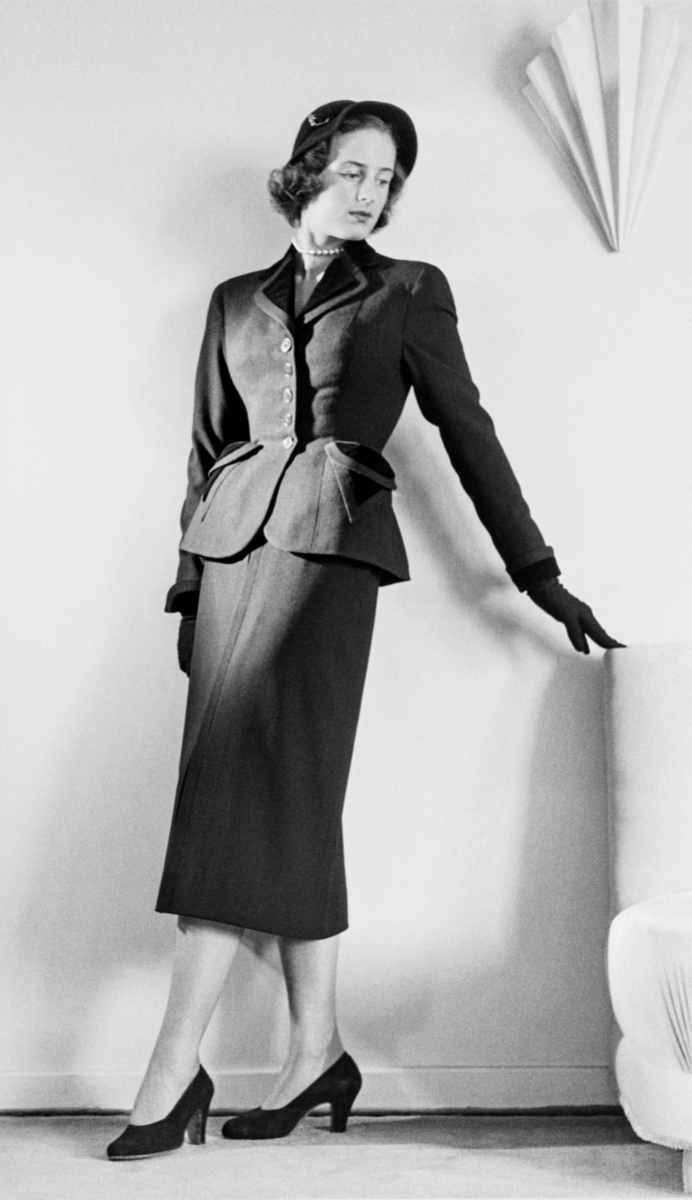
A Swedish fashion shoot, 1949.

=== Style gallery: Men's fashion ===
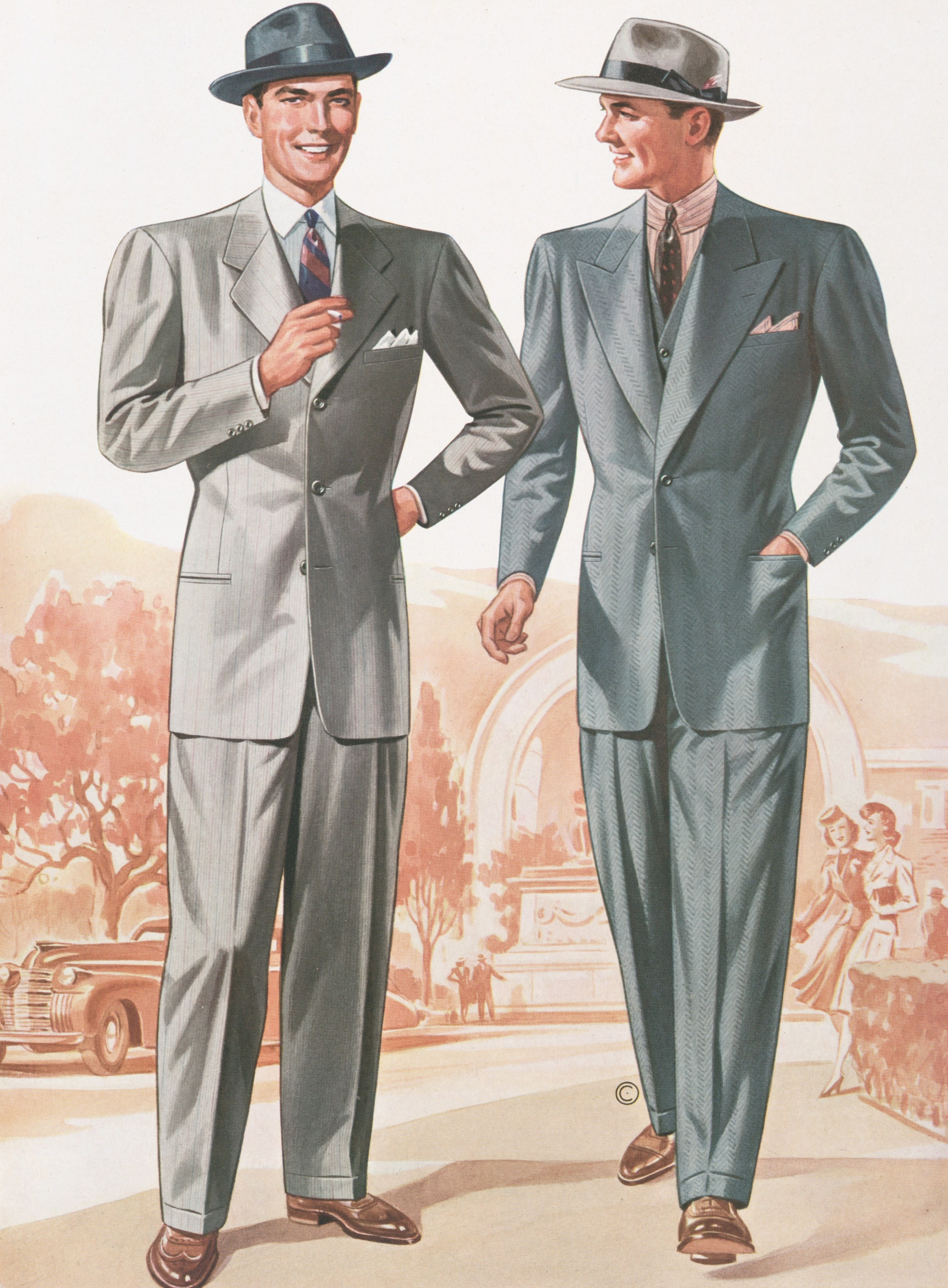
An American fashion plate for 1940–1941 men's fashion.

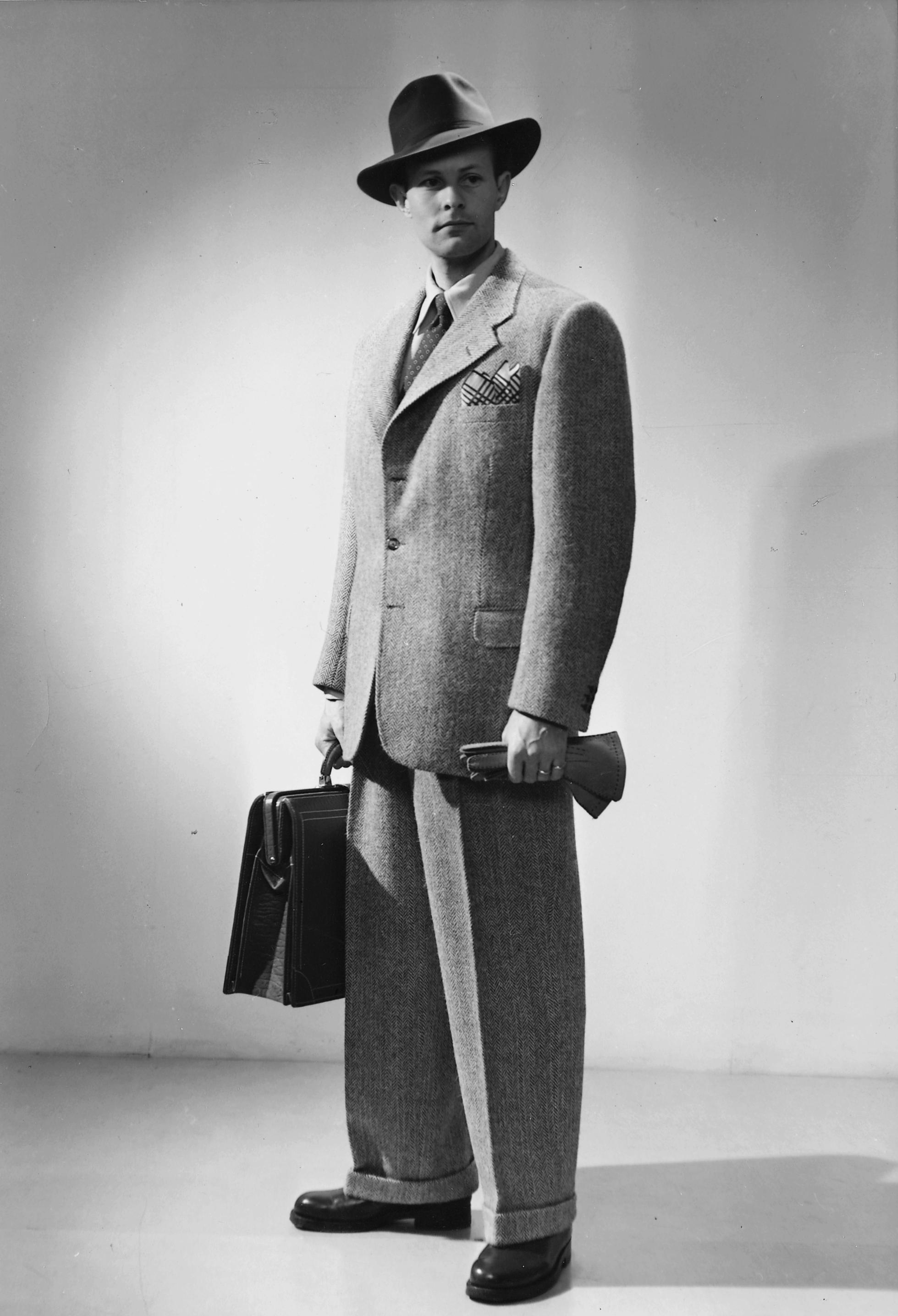
A Swedish fashion shoot, c. 1940–1945.

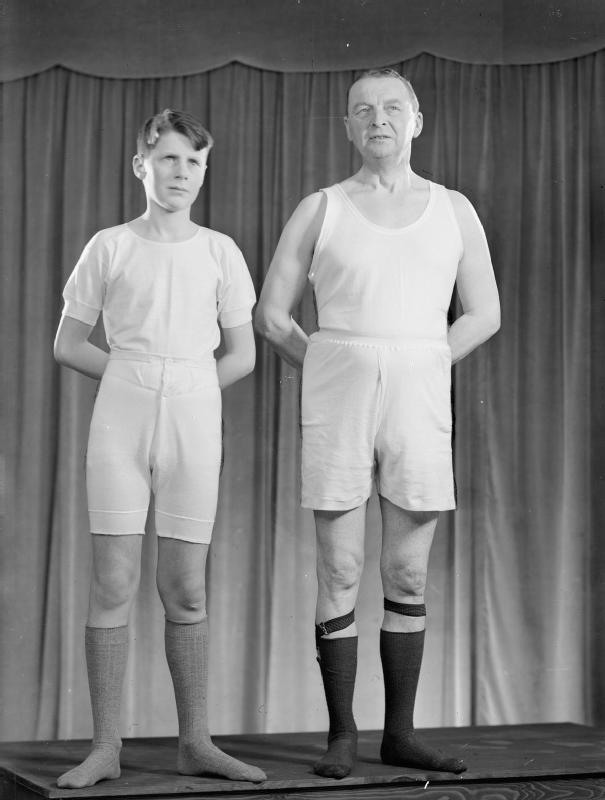
A man and a boy modelling wartime Utility underwear, United Kingdom, 1943.

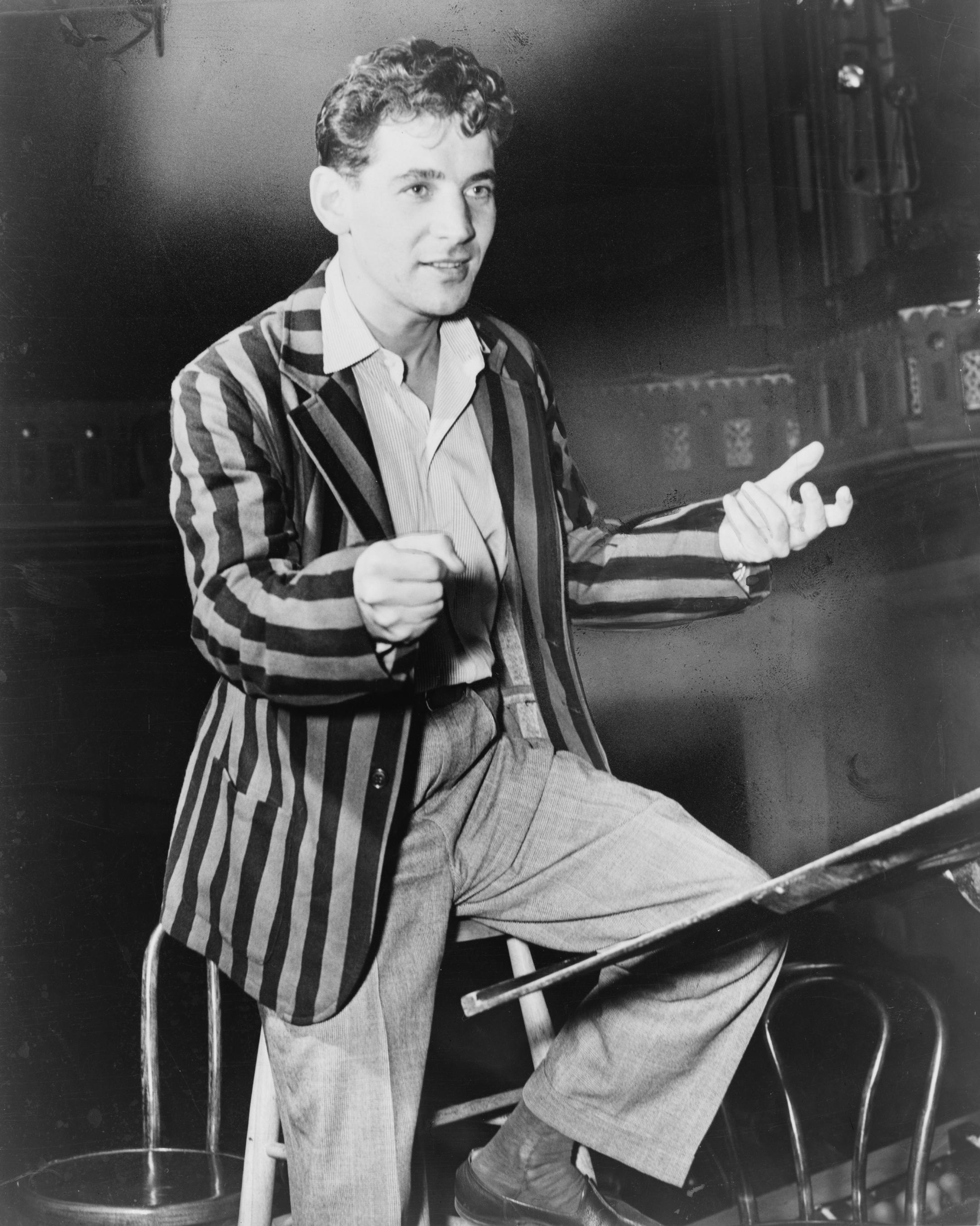
Conductor and composer Leonard Bernstein in New York City, 1945.

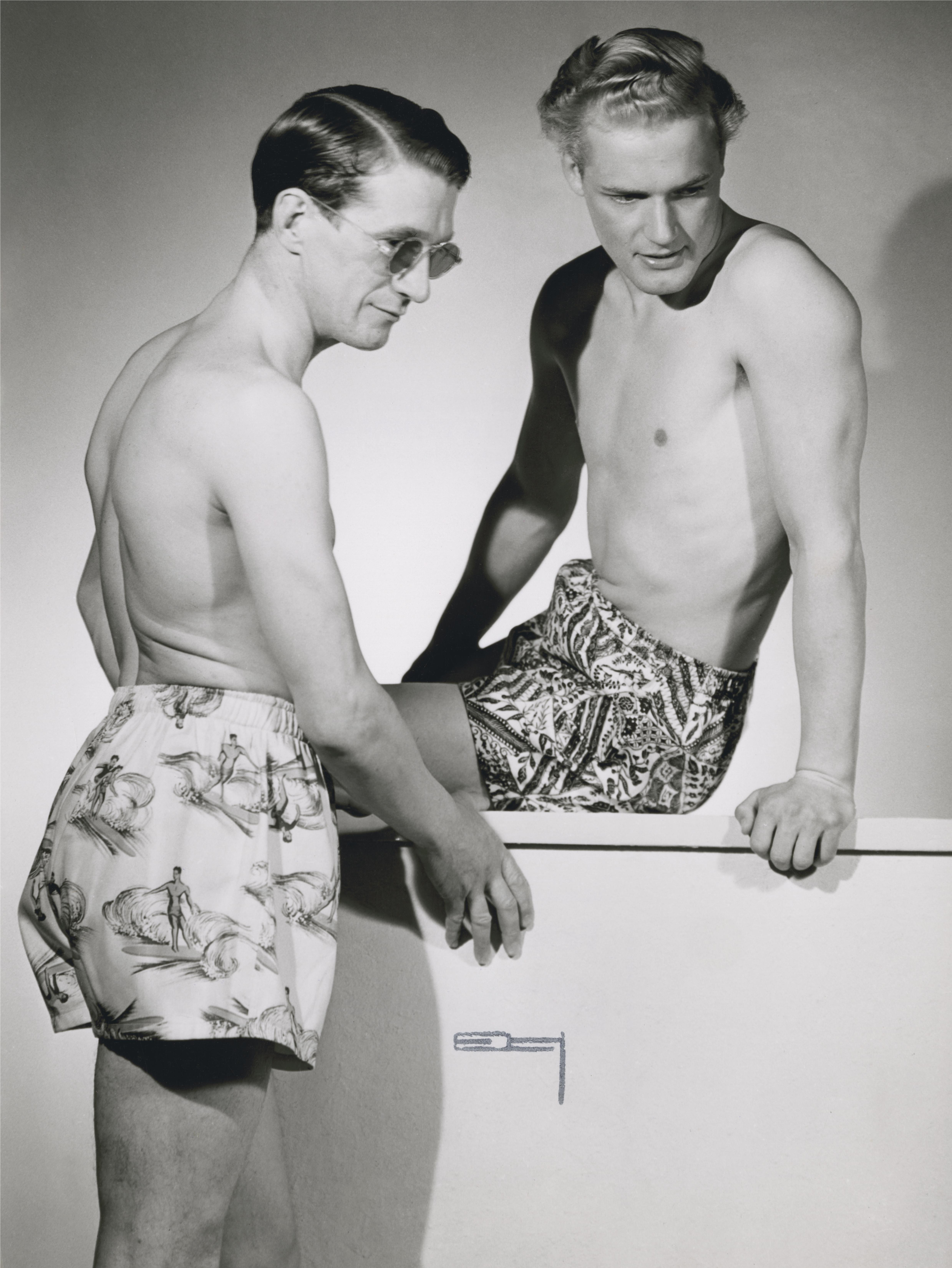
A Swedish fashion shoot for men swim trucks, 1947.

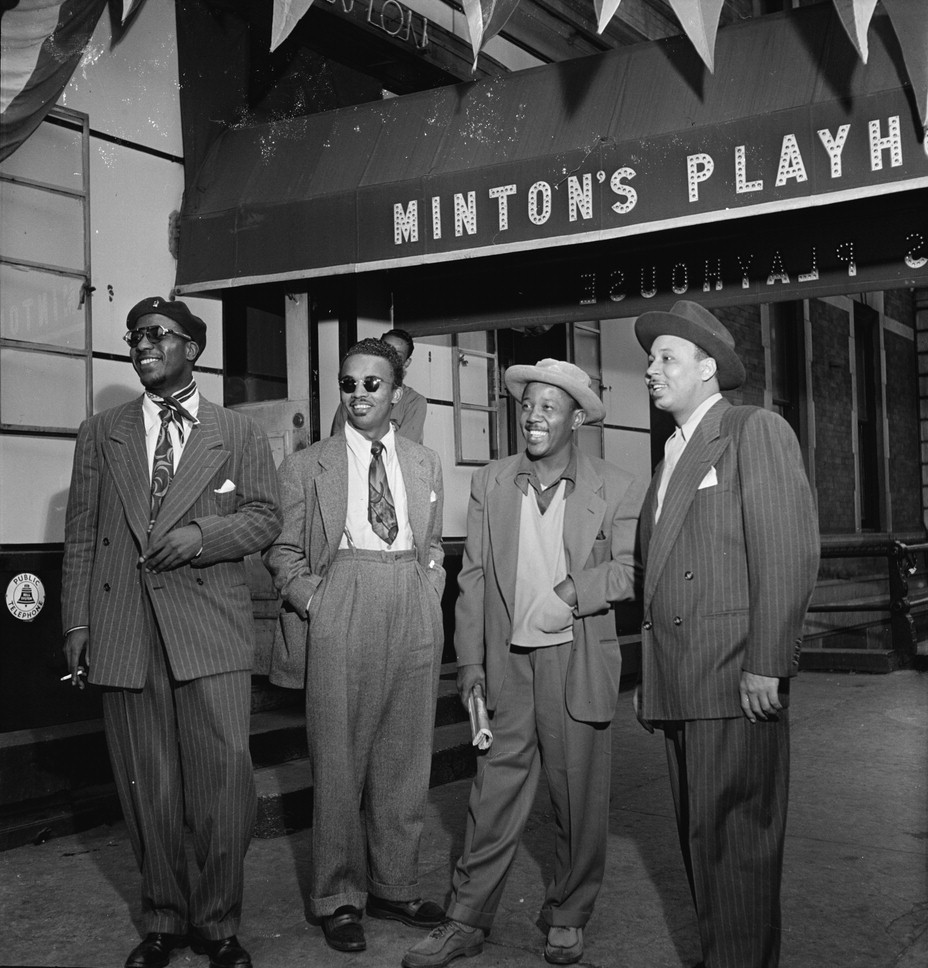
Thelonious Monk, Howard McGhee, Roy Eldridge and Teddy Hill in New York City, 1947.

== Bibliography ==
- Blanco F., José, ed. (2016). Clothing and Fashion: American Fashion from Head to Toe. Vol. 3. Bloomsbury Publishing. ISBN 978-161-069-310-3 – via Google Books.
- Cole, Daniel James; Deihl, Nancy (2015). The History of Modern Fashion. Laurence King Publishing. ISBN 9781780676036.
- Cumming, Valerie; Cunnington, C. W.; Cunnington, P. E. (2010). The Dictionary of Fashion History. Berg Publishers. ISBN 9781847885340.
- Dirix, Emmanuelle; Fiell, Charlotte (2013). 1940s Fashion: The Definitive Sourcebook. Goodman Fiell. ISBN 978-1-84796-046-7 – via Internet Archive.
- Hennessy, Kathryn; Fischel, Anna, eds. (2012). Fashion: The Definitive History of Costume and Style. Smithsonian. DK. ISBN 9780756698355.
- Laver, James (1960). The Concise History of Costume and Fashion. Harry N. Abrams, Inc. ASIN B000WONVOG.
- Tortora, Phyllis G.; Marcketti, Sara B. (2015) [1989]. Survey of Historic Costume (6th ed.). Fairchild Books. ISBN 978-1-62892-167-0.
