= Michael Donnellan (fashion designer) =

London couture designer 1940s-70s (1915–1985)

- Portrait of Michael by Tom Blau
- Born: Michael James Donnellan; 1915; Dublin, Ireland
- Died: 1985; Knightsbridge, London
- Other names: Michael of Carlos Place, Michael Donéllan
- Occupation: Fashion designer
- Notable credit: Member of Incorporated Society of London Fashion Designers

Michael Donnellan (1915–1985) – best known as Michael of Carlos Place and simply Michael – was an Irish-born fashion designer who headed the house of Lachasse from 1941, before running a successful eponymous couture house in London from 1953 to 1971. From the 1960s on, he combined the role of couturier with consultancy to mainstream fashion houses, most notably acting as a key consultant to Marks & Spencer.

His obituary of 1985 in The Times described his label as "the last great English tailoring house", saying also that Donnellan's death: "marks the end of an era". The Guardian fashion editor Alison Adburgham said he was best described as the Balenciaga of London.

== Early life and career ==
Michael Donnellan was born in Dublin and trained as a surgeon before making the move from medicine to fashion. After wartime service, he joined the fashion house of Lachasse as chief designer – he was named head of its operation from 1941. In this role at Lachasse, he was following in the footsteps of two other great London couturiers – Digby Morton and Hardy Amies. Although he was attached to a large and respected fashion house, he was already a name in his own right – Michael of Lachasse – and was included among London's "big 10" in a feature in Life in 1953 about the run up to the coronation of Elizabeth II.

He was skilled at spotting nascent fashion looks and was the first to work with the British 'supermodel' Avril James – refining her style and making her his early design 'muse'. James subsequently became one of the most familiar faces in British modelling – working for, among others, John Cavanagh – and became known in the British press as: "the girl who said no to Dior".

== Establishment of eponymous label ==
In 1953, Donnellan established his own label – from here on in he was almost universally known as 'Michael of Carlos Place', or simply 'Michael'. His showroom's location – Carlos Place – had previously been the premises of another leading light of the London couture scene Peter Russell, who sold his London business interests to Donnellan prior to emigrating to Australia.

A year later, Michael of Carlos place joined the Incorporated Society of London Fashion Designers (IncSoc) – although Donnellan had been aligned with IncSoc since 1950 as head of Lachasse.

=== Brand hallmarks ===
The hallmark of Michael of Carlos Place clothes was their exceptional tailoring, and this attracted clients such as Evelyn Laye and Claudette Colbert as well as many society women. In common with other IncSoc members, Donnellan designed in fine traditional fabrics such as tweed, but also used softer and more tactile materials such as jersey and leather. He was among the first designers in the 1950s to develop the "three piece model", a jacket, skirt and tailored matching blouse – showing this in 1957 for the first time and, it is said, inspiring the trend in Paris. By 1958, he had developed this concept further, also introducing much longer jackets that narrowed towards the hem.

Reviewing the Michael fashion collection for autumn/winter 1958, The Times reviewer said: "To examine the way seams are set, the grain of the fabric used, is to understand why such couture clothes are described as being 'built.' It is a fetish with Michael that his clothes must do something for the wearer, must flatter the woman".

== Later career ==
Donnellan was not only a skilled interpreter of couture trends but had "a prescient understanding of fashion change". Some fashion reviewers noted his impact on the precision tailoring of Clive – who trained initially with Michael and brought the Swinging London look into couture throughout the 1960s. As hemlines rose and customers moved from couture to ready-to-wear, Donnellan moved too. Although he did not close his couture house until 1971 – a period described by The Times as "fashion anarchy" – he had begun consulting to mainstream and mid-price retailers, notably Marks & Spencer, from the 1960s. In April 1965, it was reported that he had "edited' Marks & Spencer's first ever export collection in his role as the brand's consultant, an association announced at the start of that year. In his work for the dynamic mainstream fashion industry that was developing in the UK during this era, he was highly influential. His obituary notes: "he updgraded the cut and cloth of ready-to-wear clothes and became an overall advisor on mass-manufacture style."

=== Ready-to-wear and sewing patterns ===
In common with his fellow IncSoc member Mattli, Michael appeared as an expert on the BBC programme Clothes that Count, a 1967 series that focused on the burgeoning home sewing audience and gave advice on using and adapting sewing patterns. Michael – whose own designs appeared within the Vogue couturier pattern series as 'Michael of London' – assisted a home sewer to create a suit that fitted her body shape by providing advice on customising the pattern.

While some London couture designers were being criticised by the press by the late 1960s as being out of touch with the fashion trends, Donnellan was still considered influential. A 1970 review of his spring collection notes his skillful presentation of a new silhouette and quoted his guidance that if women didn't show the knees, they must define the hips. The review concluded: "It was a collection for 1970, entirely relevant to now – no nonsense about the twenties, the thirties nor the fifties." Donnellan was well placed to understand the move towards ready-to-wear – especially since he had been working with Marks & Spencer – and had begun including a few readymade items within his own couture shows from 1968, getting them cut and sewn in his Carlos Place workroom and charging around half the price of his couture lines.

Donnellan closed Michael of Carlos Place in 1971; his obituary notes that he didn't blame the market or the times for this, instead citing the shortage of skilled tailors available to British couturiers.

== Legacy ==
The Victoria and Albert Museum holds some examples of Michael outfits. His former premises, 2 Carlos Place, part of an historic listed building, is still a part of the London couture scene as a few doors down at number 8 is the London showroom for the French fashion designer Roland Mouret.
