= Roland Mouret =

French fashion designer (born 1961)

- Born: 27 August 1961 (age 65); Lourdes, France
- Occupation: Fashion designer
- Spouse: James Webster

Roland Mouret (born 27 August 1961) is a French fashion designer.

== Early life and training ==
Mouret was born in Lourdes, France, where he grew up in a devoutly Catholic family. His father was a butcher, and his mother worked as a waitress and a tour guide for visiting pilgrims in Lourdes. This is thought to have influenced his desire to be a priest in his younger years. He has one sister, Geneviève, who is a perfumier and yoga teacher.

His fashion training consisted of three months in a Parisian fashion college in 1979.

== Career ==
=== Early beginnings ===
In the 1980s, Mouret worked as creative director with Gai Pied Hebdo, was an ACT UP activist, and a model for brands such as Jean-Paul Gaultier, Yohji Yamamoto, and Claude Montana. When he left school to begin designing, he lacked skill in garment construction yet had "a native awareness of sensuality" that allowed him to create "irresistible" clothing.

=== Roland Mouret ===
Mouret showed his first line of 15 dresses in London in 1997, at the age of 36. Sharai and André Meyers bought his line in 1998.

After seven years and a move to New York, Mouret introduced his boatnecked, pencil-skirted Galaxy dress in his Spring 2006 collection. Called the "dress of the season" by many, its ubiquity was such that Vogue magazine would later write that "for weeks you [couldn't] open a newspaper or magazine without seeing another young Hollywood A-lister wearing" it. Less than two months after the dress's runway debut, Mouret split with his backers over a compensation dispute, in a move that shocked the fashion world. Mouret cited "managerial differences", but neither he nor the Meyerses has ever elaborated on the cause of the break-up. The Meyerses closed the line in 2006.

=== RM, 2006–2010 ===
After Mouret left his eponymous label, he took a two-year hiatus. He found a new backer in Simon Fuller and launched a comeback under the name RM by the designer Roland Mouret. (His previous backers had retained the rights to the Roland Mouret brand.) Under the new partnership, Mouret owns 50% of the business and is allowed creative freedom.

Before the bona fide launch of his new line, Mouret undertook small design engagements to pique public interest. He partnered with Bergdorf Goodman for a one-time-only consignment in which he personally signed each of the 36 dresses. He escorted Jacquetta Wheeler to the Met Costume Institute ball; she wore a long version of the Bergdorf dress. Mouret also designed a limited-edition dress line for the Gap.

The launch of RM by the designer Roland Mouret was designed as a global interactive event. Its inaugural fashion show was held on 4 July 2007 in Paris and featured 21 "easy-chic", geometric dresses. The next day, the show was available on the internet, and consumers could pre-order the garments on a website. As Mouret explained to Vogue, "[Women] see shows the day after they happen. Why should they have to wait?" The collection was an enormous success, with some pieces selling out within hours.

=== Roland Mouret, 2010–present ===
Mouret bought back the rights to his own name on 9 September 2010, with plans to open his first standalone store, on Carlos Place opposite The Connaught in London by 2011. The new premises includes two floors of retails space for Mouret's womenswear, menswear, atelier, design workshops and sales showroom. It is an historic couture setting, having formerly been the showroom of two Incorporated Society of London Fashion Designers members – Michael of Carlos Place and Peter Russell.

From 2010 to 2011, the Roland Mouret brand had a men’s wear line, named MR.

In 2011, French shoe label Robert Clergerie named Mouret as creative director.

In 2014, Mouret designed a 25-piece collection, mainly dresses, for Banana Republic.

In 2017, Roland Mouret returned to London Fashion Week to mark the 20th anniversary of the brand.

Although the company had already begun a financial restructure prior to the COVID-19 pandemic, closing its Manhattan flagship in 2018 and streamlining operations, the onset of the global pandemic shone further light on its precarious financial situation as sales plummeted by 80 percent in the first half of 2020.

In response, Mouret and co-owner Simon Fuller's XIX Entertainment sought outside investment to stabilise the business, with Mouret stating “I am going to be the last man standing,” in an interview with the Financial Times. The company sold a minority stake to its landlord, the Grosvenor Group, in June 2021.

In November 2021, it was announced that the company had collapsed into administration, leading to the loss of 84 jobs, with financial advisory Grant Thornton appointed to manage the administration and closure of the London flagship store.

Shortly after Mouret was forced to shut his business, fashion designer and entrepreneur Han Chong purchased the intellectual property and assets of the Roland Mouret brand through a newly formed company called SP Collection.

== Personal life ==
Mouret lives in a cottage in Framlingham, Suffolk, with his husband, the artist, sculptor, and antiquarian bookseller, James Webster.

He remains close friends with David and Victoria Beckham, whose début fashion collection he acted as an advisor for and spent his honeymoon at the Beckham's luxury apartment in Dubai's Burj Khalifa complex.
