= Bianca Mosca =

Italian-British fashion designer (d. 1950)

- Born: Bianca Lea Rosa Mottironi; Italy
- Died: June 16, 1950; Paris
- Occupation: Fashion designer
- Notable credit: Founder member of Incorporated Society of London Fashion Designers

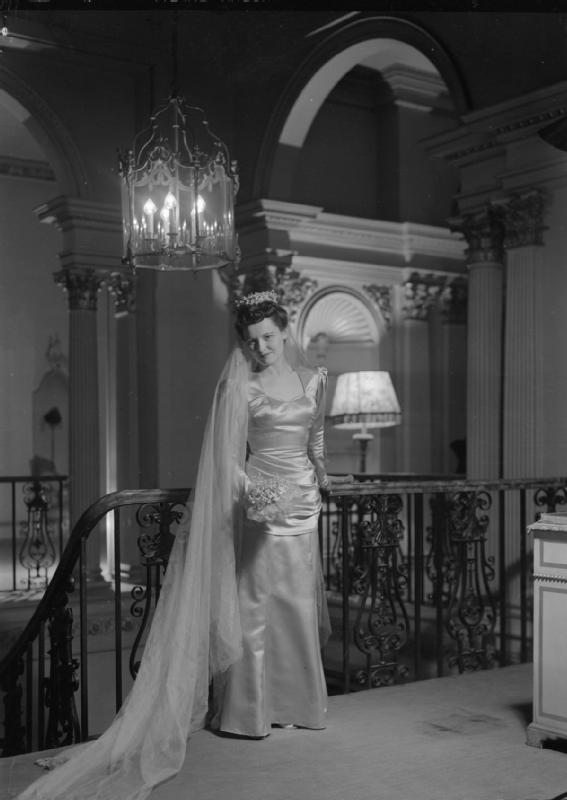
1945 Bianca Mosca wedding dress, part of her work with IncSoc, modelled by actress Peggy Bryan and designed to be worn in the British horror film Dead of Night

Bianca Mosca, born Bianca Lea Rosa Mottironi, was a London-based fashion designer who rose to prominence during the 1940s and was the only woman member of the Incorporated Society of London Fashion Designers (IncSoc), which represented the interests of the British couture industry. In her heyday she was described as "one of the big 10 of the British fashion world", the others being Digby Morton, Norman Hartnell, Charles Creed, Molyneux, Worth, Mattli, Victor Stiebel, Hardy Amies, and Peter Russell. Her firm closed in 1949, a year before her death.

== Early life and Paris career ==
Little is known about the early life of Bianca Mosca, but she was Italian by birth and a cousin of the fashion designer Elsa Schiaparelli, according to a 1932 article in The New Yorker, which describes her as: "the beautiful Bianca Mosca (Schiaparelli's cousin)". The New Yorker article notes that she had been among Schiaparelli's notable vendeuses (salespeople) in Paris. Mosca told a reporter in 1941 that she had spent eighteen years in Paris.

== Move to London ==
In 1937 Mosca launched a business in London. She was also appointed head designer for the London branch of the House of Paquin and also worked for Worth. In 1939 she became head designer for the Jacqmar studio, and it was both as its representative and as Paquin London's that she joined the Incorporated Society of London Fashion Designers as a founder member in 1942. In her role with IncSoc and Jacqmar, she became involved with designing prototype utility clothing designs.

With other IncSoc members, she became involved in creating film costumes to promote British couture. The 1949 romantic comedy Maytime in Mayfair is among her credits. Earlier, she created a wedding dress for Peggy Bryan for the 1945 horror film Dead of Night—the slim-fitting bridal outfit made under the Bianca Mosca label was photographed by the Ministry of Information.

== Marriage ==
In London, in 1942, Mosca married Claude Boisragon Crawford (born 1895), an India-born former British Army officer turned technician.

== Eponymous label ==
In 1946, Mosca opened her own couture house; this had financial backing from George Child Villiers, 9th Earl of Jersey, who would marry Mosca's niece Bianca Mottironi the following year. In early 1949, a review of her collection in the Australian press highlighted "semi-eveningwear"—sleeveless, floor length gowns in organza or brocade with full underskirts and coats designed on similar principles. At this stage, Mosca's notable clients included the Duchess of Kent. One of her co-designers was William Meggison, who went on to a successful career as a fashion designer in Australia in the 1950s.

Mosca continued to work to promote British fashion. She and Victor Stiebel—who succeeded her at Jacqmar—showed a series of suits in London in 1949 using British woollens and worsteds in a bid to attract overseas buyers. Mosca was closely involved with Sekers fabrics in Whitehaven, using its silks in her collections and working with some of its innovative fabrics. In 1949, she donated a dress to the collection of Doris Langley Moore, later to establish the Fashion Museum, Bath. The dress was permanently pleated and made of nylon fabric – as such, it became the first British couture dress in the collection to feature a synthetic silk. Mosca designed a showstopping black brocaded silk evening gown for Margot Fonteyn, worn by the prima ballerina at a reception in New York after her opening performance of Sleeping Beauty in 1949. Fonteyn was photographed by Cecil Beaton for British Vogue in this dress.

By December 1949 Mosca's eponymous label was failing and the receivers were called in—this during a post-war slump in sales of British couture, due to a dwindling home market and overseas buyers' preference for Paris fashions. Claude Crawford, Mosca's husband, told the newspaper reporting the story that the company intended to continue trading under the Bianca Mosca name and was still taking orders.

== Death and legacy ==
Having fallen ill with "a rare form of asthma" in 1949, the same year that she underwent what was described as "a serious operation", Mosca died at Paris's Hôpital Necker in June 1950. Her obituary notice in The Sydney Morning Herald notes that she had recently opened an office in Paris to promote British fabrics in France. A short tribute in The Times noted: "Fashion was her métier, and she epitomized the chic that she dispensed". In October 1951, it was announced in The Yorkshire Post that a trust fund would be established by friends of Bianca Mosca in order to award a fashion design scholarship in her name. In 1954, the Council of the Royal Society of Arts took over the administration of the Bianca Mosca Memorial Trust, introducing two new bursaries for designers in the field of fashion, shoes, millinery or jewellery and announcing that the awards jury would include Edward Molyneux and Audrey Withers.
