= Elspeth Champcommunal =

English fashion designer (1888–1976)

- Elspeth Champcommunal in 1928, photographed by Man Ray
- Born: Elspeth Mary Hodgson; 1888
- Died: 10 November 1976 (aged 87–88)
- Occupations: Fashion designer, magazine editor

Elspeth Champcommunal (1888 – 10 November 1976) was a British fashion designer and the first editor of Vogue in Britain. She was influential as a designer in her own right in Paris, with an eponymous brand, later taking on the role of chief designer of Worth London. She was among the founder members of the Incorporated Society of London Fashion Designers (IncSoc) and remained involved with the organisation during her tenure at Worth London.

== Background and life in France ==
Born Elspeth Mary Hodgson, little is known about her early life. British by birth, she married the French artist Joseph Champcommunal, who died in 1914 in the first year of World War I. She remained in France, becoming closely associated with the Paris literary and artistic set and posing for portraits by photographer Man Ray. She was a friend of Virginia Woolf – who called her 'Champco' – and the Bloomsbury Set artist Roger Fry, who helped her sort through her husband's paintings and would later stay in her home in the south of France.

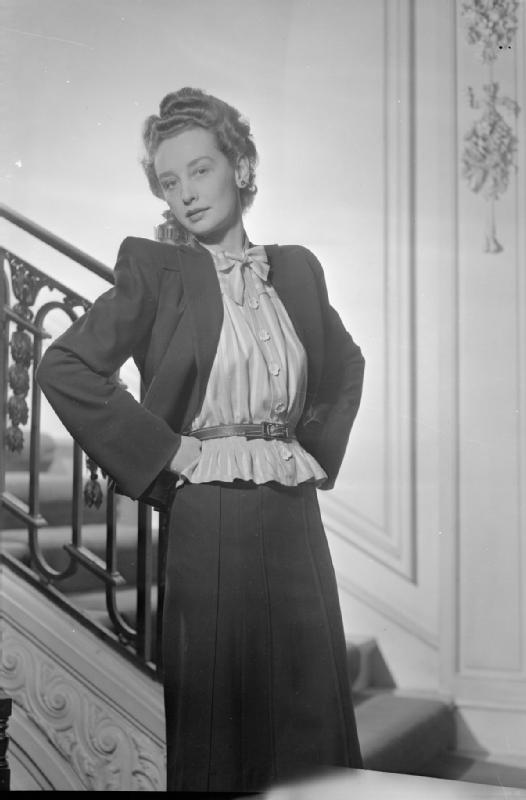
Elspeth Champcommunal outfit for Worth London, 1945, photographed by the Ministry of Information to promote utility designs created by IncSoc members source: IWM

She travelled in Europe every summer from 1929–39 with the American literary publisher and modernist Jane Heap and Heap's friend Florence Reynolds. Champcommunal was in the Bavarian Alps with her two friends and the American journalists/writers Solita Solano and Janet Flanner at the outbreak of World War II and the group managed to return to London via Switzerland. Heap would remain in London as Champcommunal's partner until her death in 1964.

== Editor's role ==
Champcommunal became the first editor of the Vogue London edition, which was launched in September 1916. Produced in Europe to bypass shipping restrictions and paper shortages, the British version was largely a reproduction of the American edition initially, but Champcommunal thought it important that Vogue be more than a fashion magazine and it later included articles on health and beauty, society and sport, as well as travel and opinion pieces. Champcommunal remained with the magazine until the end of 1922.

== Eponymous label ==
From the mid 1920s, Champcommunal had an eponymous couture label in France. An advertisement in a French periodical of 1926 places her salon in the Rue de Penthièvre, in the eighth arrondissement of Paris. Champcommunal's reputation was significant enough for one of her gowns to feature in the same year in an American newspaper article entitled: "Clothes that express fall fashion decrees".

== Worth London ==
After moving back to Britain with Jane Heap, Champcommunal was appointed head designer with the firm of J. Reville-Terry. When this took over the British operation of Worth in 1936 – a formal split from the Paris arm – Champcommunal became house designer for Worth London.

In 1942, when IncSoc was founded, Champcommunal represented Worth's interests among the so-called "big ten" of couture houses in London. In this role, she participated in IncSoc activities – including creating utility couture designs to promote its work. An image of a Worth London outfit by Champcommunal, comprising pussycat-bow blouse and slim tailored suit, originally photographed by the Ministry of Information in 1945, remains part of the Imperial War Museum archive. In 1949, Worth London designs featured in the lighthearted fashion-themed romance Maytime in Mayfair within a fashion show sequence promoting the work of IncSoc members. In March 1953, shortly before her retirement, Champcommunal was photographed with other IncSoc members for a lavish feature in Life magazine about the preparations for the coronation of Queen Elizabeth.

== See also ==
- Charles Frederick Worth
- House of Worth

Media offices
Preceded by First	Editor of British Vogue; 1916–1922	Succeeded by Dorothy Todd
