= Incorporated Society of London Fashion Designers =

- Formation: 1942; 84 years ago
- Purpose: Maintain and develop London as a fashion centre
- Location: London, England
- Remarks: Disbanded in the 1970s and succeeded by British Fashion Council

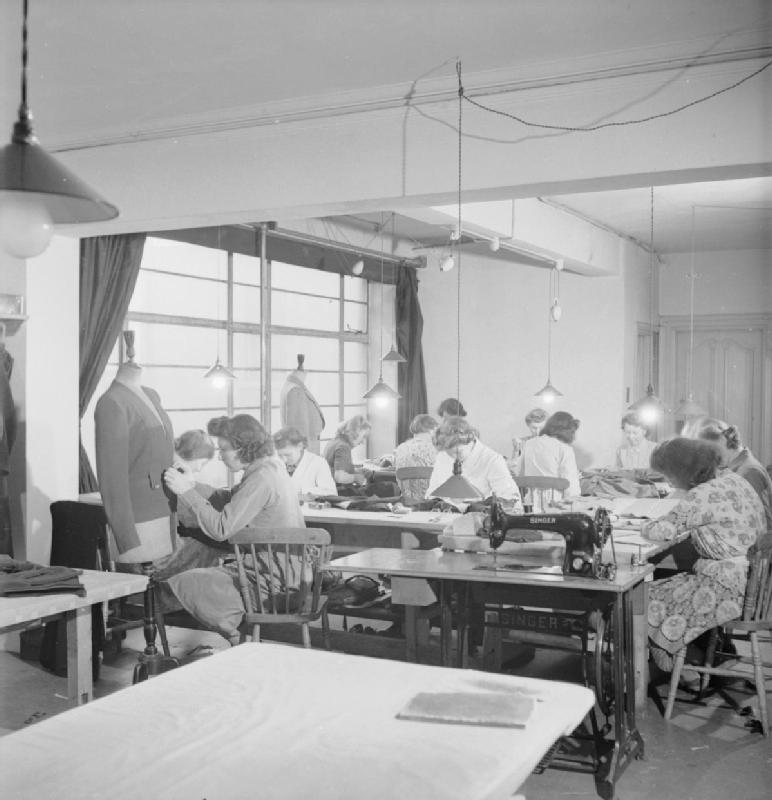
The design studio of Norman Hartnell source: IWM

Peter Russell dinner gown, produced during wartime for IncSoc and photographed by the Ministry of Information to promote the idea that utility could be incorporated into couture source: IWM

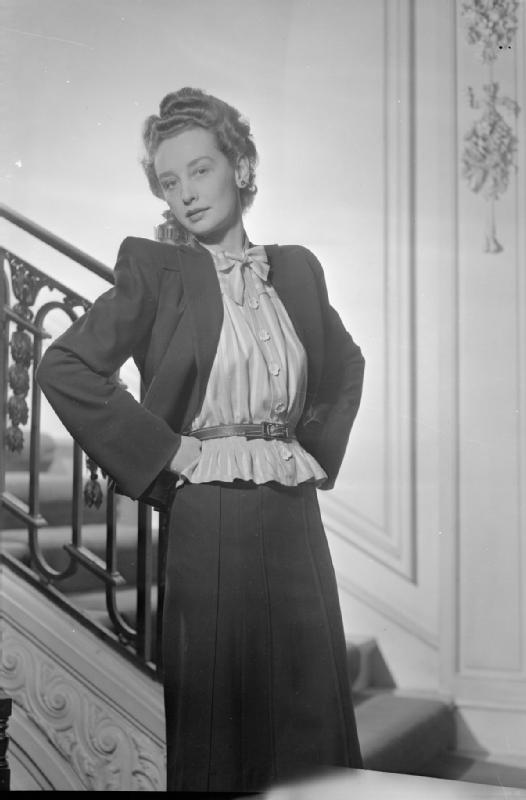
Elspeth Champcommunal design for Worth London, produced under wartime restrictions source: IWM

The Incorporated Society of London Fashion Designers (also known as IncSoc, Inc Soc and ISLFD) was a membership organisation founded in 1942 to promote the British fashion and textile industry and create luxury couture to sell abroad for the war effort. It aimed to build the relationship between government and fashion industry and represent the interests of London couturiers. The organisation continued after the war and sought to present itself as an alternative to the revived Paris couture industry.

== Establishment ==
Some sources suggest Inc Soc was established by Harry Yoxall, managing editor of British Vogue, and others indicate it was the idea of Sir Cecil Weir of the Board of Trade.

Ernestine Carter states that the IncSoc had its origins in 1941 with an export collection sent to South America by the British Colour Council, designed by Charles Creed (at Fortnum & Mason), Norman Hartnell, Edward Molyneux, Digby Morton, Peter Russell, Victor Stiebel (of Jacqmar) and Worth London. Along with Bianca Mosca and Hardy Amies, all would go on to be founder-members of the IncSoc the following year, except Creed, who was the first designer voted in as a member.

In March 1942, on the invitation of the Board of Trade, the members of Inc Soc – all of whom were used to custom-creating designs for customers – designed 34 utility clothing garments suitable for mass manufacture in order to demonstrate how high-fashion elegance could be achieved within the strict rationing restrictions. Known as the Couturier Scheme, the project had a very high profile in the press at the time with a fashion show held to launch the clothes. The prototype models were featured in Vogue magazine and donated to the Victoria and Albert Museum later that year.

== Post-war activities ==
Inc Soc had organised seasonal showings in each London couture house based on the Parisian couture system. After the war, Inc Soc coordinated spring and autumn collections in London with the Chambre Syndicale de la Haute Couture in Paris to allow cash-rich overseas buyers to take in both cities' collections.

In 1949, members of Inc Soc showcased British fashion in the film Maytime in Mayfair in a sequence that showed models wearing an outfit by each of the ten member designers.

In July 1968, The Guardian reported that although associate membership for makers of hats, gloves, shoes and other accessories had been wound up, the society continued with Edward Rayne as chairman and Lady Hartwell (previously Lady Pamela Berry) as president.

By 1969, IncSoc was reported to be struggling due to high taxes and overheads and competition from London's booming ready-to-wear designers. Most had added ready-to-wear designs to shore up their businesses. In January that year the society – which had shrunk from 12 to seven members over the previous six years – announced it would no longer host a group fashion event for UK and international buyers. Instead, each designer would host an individual show. The organisation was still extant in 1974, but disbanded soon afterwards.

== Membership ==
The founding members were nicknamed the "Big Eight" in the press of the time. By 1949 they had become the "Big Ten" or "Top Ten of Fashion". The fashion journalist Ernestine Carter recalled in 1974: "At one point we called them the Top Ten, another the First Eleven, once the Baker's Dozen, then a Rowing Eight. Finally, we stopped giving them numbers at all." Each new member needed to receive the votes of at least two-thirds of the existing members. Normally, the designer had to have shown at least four collections before being considered for membership, although some later members achieved this faster, due to the strength of their work.

Starting in 1956 IncSoc began accepting fee-paying associate memberships from supporting fashion businesses, industries such as: hosiery, knitwear, footwear, furriers, corsetry, knitwear, leather and textile merchants, and millinery.

=== IncSoc members and joining dates ===
Listings show joining date, where known, and were originally published in an article in Costume, the journal of the Costume Society, in 2001. The couture house of Rahvis is not included in that article, but was listed as among the members in the 1960s in UK and international newspaper reports. In 1974, Ernestine Carter put together a potted history of the Society with the assistance of Ann Ryan, who administrated the Society between 1956 and 1960. They noted that Norman Hartnell, Hardy Amies, and Rahvis were the last three remaining members of the Society, with the shoemaker Edward Rayne, 'though not defunct, in abeyance.'

- Hardy Amies – 1942, founder member. Was still a member in 1974.
- John Cavanagh – 1952
- Charles Creed – 1942. While Carter lists Creed as a contributor to the 1941 collection, he is not listed as one of the original eight founding members of 1942, but as the first designer to be elected to the society.
- Angele Delanghe – 1945–7, rejoined 1961
- Clive Evans – worked at three IncSoc houses before launching eponymous label 'Clive', joining in 1964
- Norman Hartnell – 1942, founder member. Was still a member in 1974.
- Lachasse – 1950
- Michael Donnellan (formerly Lachasse then eponymous label Michael of Carlos Place) – 1954
- Mattli (Giuseppe 'Jo' Gustave) – date not recorded, but early 1940s
- Molyneux – 1942, founder member. (resigned 1947 when sister took over business. However, Carter & Ryan say Molyneux left the Society in 1950.)
- Digby Morton – 1942, founder member.
- Bianca Mosca (London branch of Paquin; Jacqmar studio; own couture house from 1946) – 1942, founder member. Died in 1950.
- Ronald Paterson – 1953, showed first collection in 1954.
- Rahvis – sisters Raemonde and Dora joined in 1968 They were still members of the Society in 1974.
- Peter Russell – 1942, founder member. Retired in 1952.
- Michael Sherard – 1949
- Victor Stiebel – 1942, founder member. Retired in 1963.
- Worth London (Charlotte Mortimer and Elspeth Champcommunal) – 1942, founder member. Carter lists Mortimer, who ran Worth London, as a founder, although Champcommunal was house designer. In the 1950s, Owen Hyde Clark was the designer for Worth London. Worth London resigned from the Society in 1960.

==== Associate members ====
- Aristoc – 1956 (hosiery)
- Berlei Foundations – 1956 (corsetry)
- Bolton Leathers – 1956 (leather merchants)
- Dumas & Maury – 1956 (textile merchants)
- Edward Harvane (model milliner)
- Lilliman & Cox Ltd. – 1956 (drycleaners)
- S. Lock Ltd. (embroidery firm)
- Simone Miraman – 1956 (model milliner)
- Paris House Ltd.
- Pringle of Scotland – 1956 (knitwear)
- H&M Rayne – 1956 (footwear)
- Rene of Mayfair Ltd. (hairdresser)
- Vidal Sasson (hairdresser)
- Aage Thaarup Ltd. – 1956 (model milliner)
- Vernier (Model Hats) Ltd. – 1956 (model milliner)

=== Presidents and chairs ===
According to Carter and Ryan, the presidents of the society and their dates were:

- The Hon. Mrs. Reginald Fellowes – May 1942 – November 1948.
- Lady Rothermere (Ann Charteris, later Mrs. Ian Fleming) – January 1949 – February 1952
- Elizabeth Jane Clark, wife of Kenneth Clark – April 1952 – November 1953
- Lady Pamela Berry (later Lady Hartwell) – April 1954 onwards.

The chairs were:

- Margaret Havinden (wife of Ashley Havinden) – until 1942
- Edward Molyneux – May 1942 – December 1946
- Norman Hartnell – January 1947 – June 1956
- Victor Stiebel – June 1956 – June 1959
- Hardy Amies – June 1959 – June 1960
- Edward Rayne – June 1960 onwards (Rayne shoes was an associate IncSoc member)

== See also ==
- British Fashion Council
