= Delanghe =

Delanghe is a surname. Notable people with the surname include:

- Angele Delanghe (died 1971), Belgian fashion designer
- Maxime Delanghe (born 2001), Belgian footballer
