= Hardy Amies (fashion house) =

British fashion house

Coordinates: 51°30′39.7″N 0°8′25.6″W

Hardy Amies London Limited
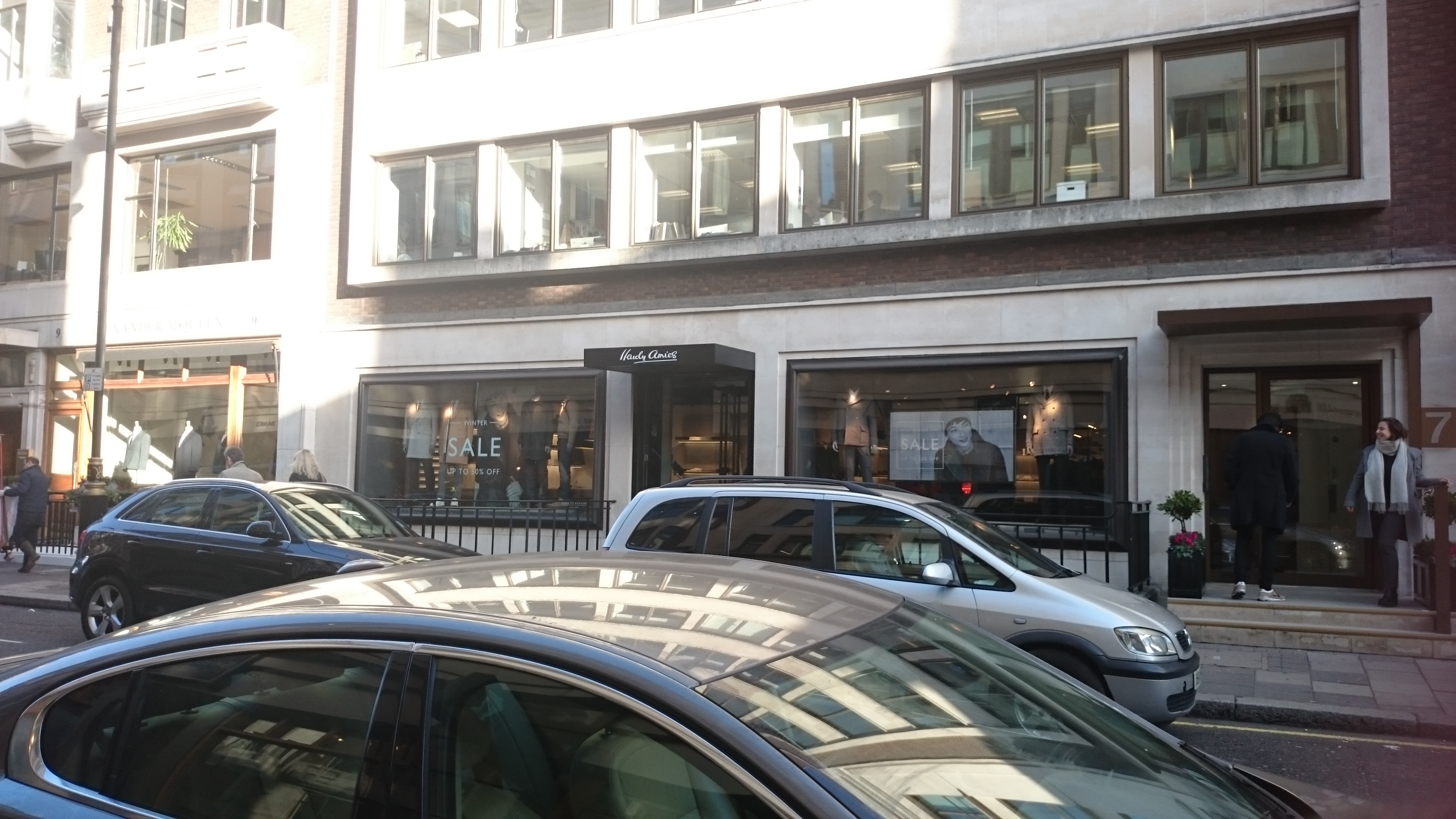
- Location in 2017 at 8 Savile Row in London
- Type: Private limited company
- Industry: Fashion
- Founded: 1946
- Founder: Sir Hardy Amies
- Defunct: 2024
- Headquarters: Savile Row, London, W1; United Kingdom
- Key people: Tony Yusuf (Managing Director); Mehmet Ali (Design Director)
- Products: Luxury goods

Hardy Amies London Limited was a UK-based fashion house specializing in modern luxury menswear.

Sir Hardy Amies founded the house in 1946. He was involved in the ready-to-wear menswear market in the 1950s and 1960s.

Amies was commissioned to create high-profile specialized clothing for customers, including the British World cup and Olympic teams, Stanley Kubrick for 2001: A Space Odyssey, and Queen Elizabeth II.

The fashion house has changed ownership several times throughout its history and, for a time, was the property of Fung Capital.

In 2018, the company went into administration for a second time. The Savile Row store was closed in March 2019 and Hackett London took over the space in June as its flagship store.

== History ==
Sir Hardy Amies, KCVO (17 July 1909 – 5 March 2003) was born Edwin Hardy Amies in Maida Vale, London. His father worked for the London County Council, and his mother was a saleswoman for Madame Gray at Machinka & May, London. In his teens, he adopted his mother's maiden name (Hardy) and always cited her as the inspiration for his chosen professional path.

Amies was educated at Brentwood School, Essex, leaving in 1927. Although his father wanted him to attend Cambridge University, it was his ambition to become a journalist. His father relented and arranged for a meeting between his son and R. D. Blumenfeld, the editor of the Daily Express. His father was mortified when Blumenfeld suggested his son travel around Europe to gain some worldly experience. After spending three years in France and Germany, learning the languages, working for a customs agent, as an English tutor in Antibes, and later Bendorf, Germany, Amies returned to England, where in 1930, he became a sales assistant in a ceramic wall-tile factory, after which he secured a trainee position as a weight machine salesman with W & T Avery Ltd. in Birmingham.

Amies' mother's contacts in the fashion world and his flair for writing secured him his first job in fashion. It was his vivid description of a dress, written in a letter to a retired French seamstress, which brought Hardy to the attention of the owner of the Mayfair couture house Lachasse on Farm Street, Berkeley Square, as the wearer of the dress was the owner's wife. He became Managing director at the age of 25 in 1934. In 1937, he scored his first success with a Linton tweed suit in sage green with a cerise overcheck called 'Panic.' 'Panic' was to be his debut in the fashion bible Vogue and was photographed by Cecil Beaton. By the late 1930s, Amies was designing the entire Lachasse collection. His second celebration creation was 'Made in England,' a biscuit-coloured checked suit for the Hollywood ingénue Mildred Shay. He left Lachasse in 1939 and joined the House of Worth in 1941.

At the outbreak of World War II, Amies was recruited into military intelligence because of his fluent German and French. He listed among his accomplishments on his application mountaineering, shooting, boxing and sketching. Amies saw service in the Special Operations Executive or SOE. Posted to SOE Headquarters in Baker Street in London, Amies was put in charge of the Belgium section and worked with the various Belgian resistance groups organising sabotage assignments. Amies rose to the rank of lieutenant colonel. SOE's commander Major General Colin Gubbins did not regard a dressmaker as suitable military material, but his training report stated:

"This officer is far tougher both physically and mentally than his rather precious appearance would suggest. He possesses a keen brain and an abundance of shrewd sense. His only handicap is his precious appearance and manner, and these are tending to decrease."

=== № 14 Savile Row ===
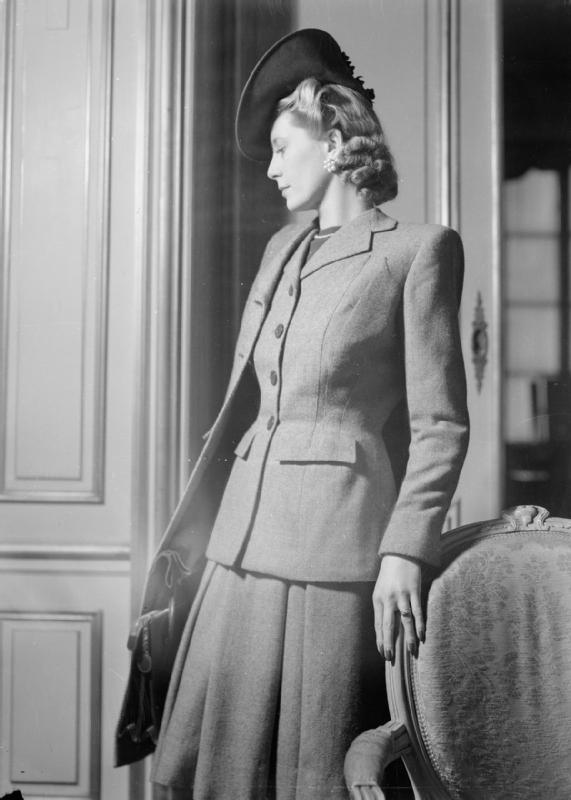
A wool outfit by Hardy Amies in 1945

On 12 November 1945, Virginia, Countess of Jersey (erstwhile Hollywood film star and the first Mrs. Cary Grant), who had been a former client during his days at Lachasse, financed Amies' move to Savile Row. The following January, Amies established his own couture fashion house business – Hardy Amies Ltd. Although Savile Row is the home of English bespoke tailoring, the Hardy Amies brand developed to become known for its classic and beautifully tailored clothes for both men and women. The business quickly took off in the postwar years when customers, who had been deprived of couture during the preceding years, snapped up his elegant, traditional designs. Amies was quoted at the time as saying, "A woman's day clothes must look equally good at Salisbury Station as the Ritz bar". Amies was vice-chairman of the Incorporated Society of London Fashion Designers from 1954 to 1956 and then chairman from 1959 to 1960.

=== Commercial success ===
Amies was successful in business by being able to commercially extract value from his designs while not replicating his brand to the point of exploitation. Amies was one of the first European designers to venture into the ready-to-wear market when he teamed up with Hepworths in 1959 to design a range of menswear. In 1961, Amies made fashion history by staging the first men's ready-to-wear catwalk shows at the Savoy Hotel in London. The runway show was a first on many levels as it was both the first-time music was played and for the designer to accompany models on the catwalk.

Amies also undertook design for work wear, which developed from designing special clothes for England's 1966 World Cup team, the 1972 British Olympic squad; and groups such as the Oxford University Boat Club and London Stock Exchange. During the mid-1970s, he ventured into interior design, including designs for Crown Wallpaper. In 1974, Amies was entered into the International Best Dressed List Hall of Fame.

=== 2001: A Space Odyssey ===
In 1967, Amies was commissioned by director Stanley Kubrick to design the costumes for his film 2001: A Space Odyssey. The collection allowed Amies to design totally futuristic fashions. In 2001, the standard attire was a business-as-usual approach to corporate fashion. There were no neck-ties as they were in zero gravity. The Russian women scientists wore dark conservative clothing, reflecting their own conservative values. Although Kubrick's 2001 wardrobe was practical, it still reflected the mid-1960s slender look. The military and spacecraft uniforms were as common as they are now, with no dramatic changes. American women in 2001 retained roles they held in the 1960s as Hotel receptionists and air stewardesses. The women wore space-age travelling hats while carrying handbags. According to 'Setting the Scene' by Robert S. Sennett (Harry N. Abrams, Inc., Publishers, 1994), many design elements of the film seem to reflect swinging London c. 1968 rather than the imagined future. The stewardesses' uniforms, designed by Hardy Amies, look like the uncomfortable unisex pant suits that were being promoted in the late 1960s. An epic science fiction film, it demonstrated the immense range of Amies' design ability and was nominated for four Academy Awards – receiving one for visual effects. The film was an inductee of the 1991 National Film Registry list.

Amies' work was seen in a handful of other films of the 1960s: he dressed Albert Finney in Two for the Road, Tony Randall in The Alphabet Murders, Joan Greenwood in The Amorous Prawn and Deborah Kerr in The Grass is Greener.

=== Queen Elizabeth II ===
Amies is best known to the British public for his work for Queen Elizabeth II. The association began in 1950 when Amies made several outfits for then Princess Elizabeth's royal tour to Canada. Although the couture side of the Hardy Amies business was traditionally less financially successful, the award of a Royal Warrant as an official dressmaker in 1955 gave his house respectability and publicity. One of his best-known creations is the gown he designed in 1977 for Queen Elizabeth's Silver Jubilee portrait, which he said was "immortalised on a thousand biscuit tins." An estimated 500 million people watched the day of events on television. Knighted in 1989, Amies held the Warrant until his death in 2003. He gave up visiting The Queen himself in 1990 so that his Design Director, Ken Fleetwood, could create for the Queen until 1996. The House of Hardy Amies was still designing for her under Design Director Jon Moore until 2002.

=== ABC of Men's Fashion ===
Having written a regular column for Esquire magazine on men's fashion, Amies published the book ABC of Men's Fashion in 1964. His strict male dress code – with commandments on everything from socks to the summer wardrobe – made for compelling reading:

A man should look as if he has bought his clothes with intelligence, put them on with care and then forgotten all about them.

When the Hardy Amies designer archive was opened in July 2009 on Savile Row, the Victoria & Albert Museum reissued the book.

== Hardy Amies' ownership ==
In May 1973, Hardy Amies Ltd. was sold to Debenhams, which had already purchased Hepworths, who distributed the Hardy Amies line. Amies purchased the business back in 1981. In May 2001, Amies sold his business to the Luxury Brands Group. He retired at the end of the year when Moroccan-born designer Jacques Azagury became head of couture. In November 2008, after going bankrupt, the Hardy Amies brand was acquired by Fung Capital. Hardy Amies has been owned since 2008 by No.14 Savile Row, which in turn is owned by Fung Capital which is the private investment holding company of the Fung family, who are separately the controlling shareholders of publicly listed Li & Fung Limited and Trinity Limited.

In 2018 Hardy Amies went into administration for the second time, and a buyer was being sought for its operations and intellectual property rights in 2019. The company had been operating at a loss for some time. The Savile Row store was closed in March 2019 and the space taken over by Hackett London in June as its flagship store.
