= Georges (store) =

Australian department store

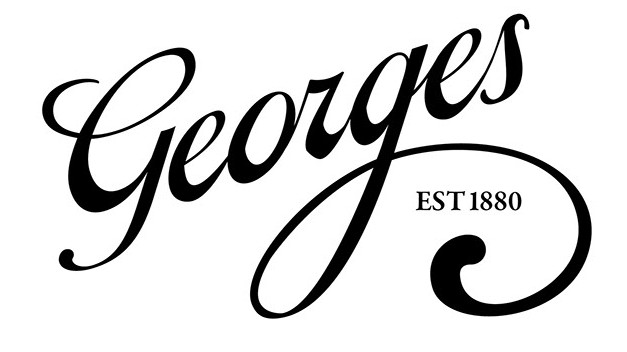
- Type: Department Store
- Industry: Retail
- Founded: 1880
- Defunct: 1995
- Fate: Closed by David Jones
- Headquarters: 162—168 Collins Street, Melbourne, Victoria, Australia
- Key people: William George and Alfred George (founders)
- Products: clothing; manchester; leather goods; soft furnishings; furniture; hardware; food
- Website: http://www.georgesoncollins.com.au/

Georges was a department store in Melbourne, Victoria, Australia, established in 1880 and closed in 1995, and was well known for its last 50 years as the city’s premier women's fashion department store.

== History ==
Brothers William Henry George (1855—1935) and Alfred Harley George (1857—1930) were born in England, educated in London, and began their working life in retailing in the 1870s. They emigrated to Melbourne in 1877, and soon found work at Robinson’s drapers at 37 Collins Street East, in 'the block', the most fashionable section of retailing in the city. In 1880, when still only in their late 20s, the opportunity came to take over the business, rebranded as George & George. Finding success in a booming economy, in 1883 they moved a few doors down to a large four-storey building at 11-17 Collins Street East (now 280 Collins Street), which had been built in 1877 as Briscoe's warehouse), and rebranded again as George & George’s Federal Emporium, selling a wider range of goods, from men's and women's clothing, underwear and hats, to children's toys, manchester, furniture, drugs, sweets, wines and spirits, and even coal and wood.

In 1888, when financier Benjamin Fink bought the building, planning to replace it with an arcade, they bought the business of the Equitable Co-operative Store, located a block away, up a hill, and away from the retail heart of the city. It was a grand classical revival style building at what is now 162—168 Collins Street, and was built in 1884, designed by architects John Grainger and Charles D'Ebro. For over a year they ran the business in the two sites, until in September 1889 a disastrous fire destroyed their 280 Collins premises (which was then replaced by the first stage of the Block Arcade). Despite being underinsured, they kept the business going at the new location, soon doing well enough that in 1891 the building was refurbished and extended through to Little Collins Street, designed by D'Ebro alone.

The 1880s boom was followed by an economic crash in the 1890s, when William left for New Zealand, becoming a partner in the Economic Store in Wellington, while Alfred stayed and managed to keep the store afloat. One notable innovation in the 1896 was the sale of bicycles, especially to women, with the top floor transformed into a 'cyclotorium', where they could learn to ride the newly improved devices.

Following financial restructuring and the return of William George, the store underwent a major renovation in 1908, inserting a full-height atrium in the centre, and building extensive ‘walk-through’ show windows on Collins Street, to provide for window shoppers in a period when store hours were curtailed through labour laws. The new store was no longer a universal provider, instead specialising in women's wear and accessories. In the 1910s and 20s, there was much competition, with large and small department stores in the city and suburbs competing for custom; Georges maintained a position through basement sales, and firmly aiming at middle income and better off women. In 1930 Alfred George died, and William's son Douglas George became a director, while William himself stayed on through into his 70s.

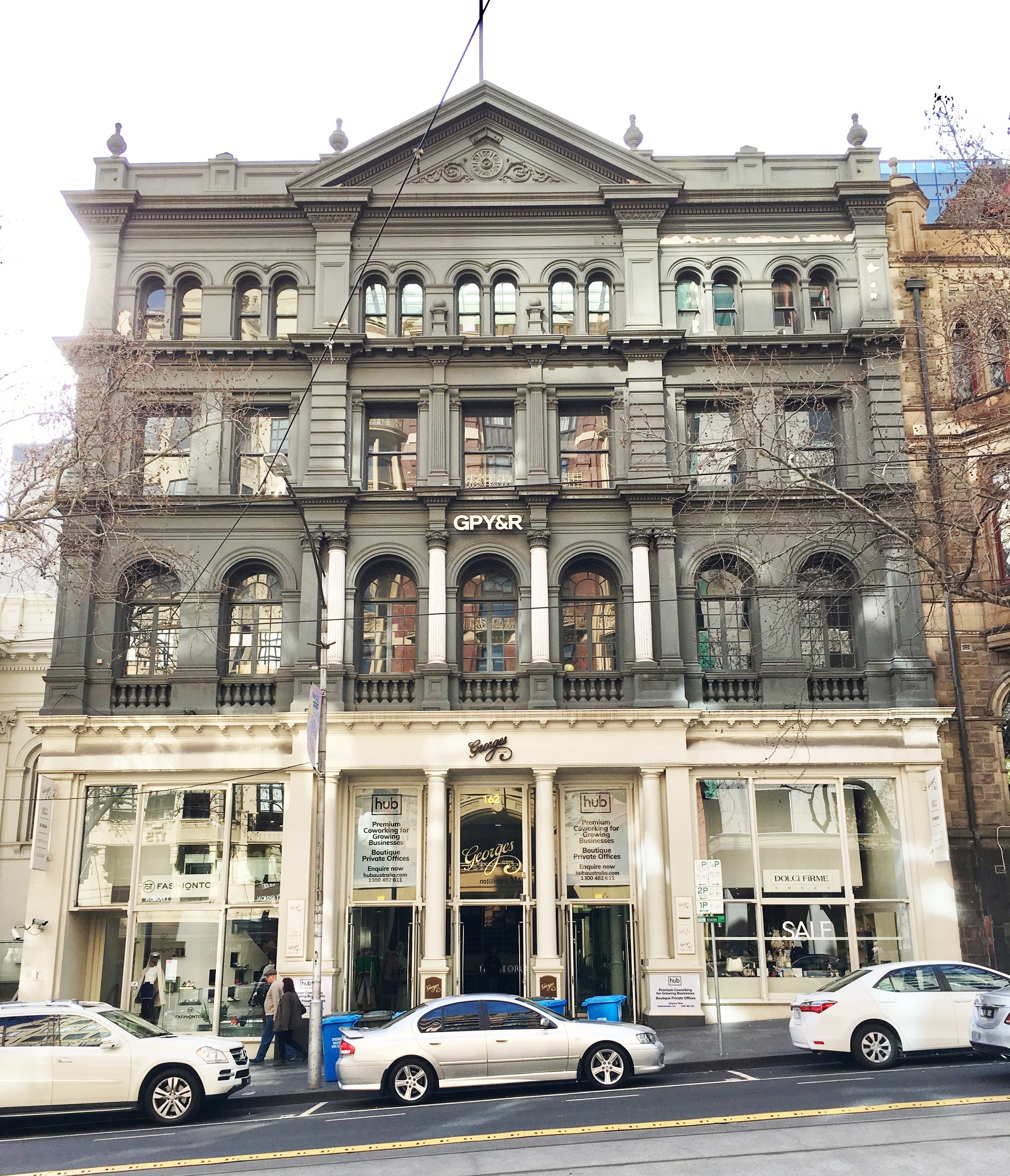
Georges building in 2018

The store managed to survive the Great Depression of the early 1930s. A renovation in 1933 reinstated the floors across the atrium. In 1934 the name changed to the simpler Georges, and in 1935 William George, still a part of the store aged 80, died. In 1936, Arthur John George, the son of a third George brother, who had grown up in Wellington New Zealand and become a shoe retailer, was appointed general manager. He re-introduced an old motto, Quod facimus, Valde facimus, (What we do - We do well), and ended the bargain basement sales. In 1937, Douglas George hired Reta Findlay, one of Australia's few women advertising executives, to run promotions, bringing a new sophistication and sense of exclusiveness to the store's advertising, window displays, and eventually their buying policies. A thorough internal renovation in 1938 involved all new counters and displays and an elegant curved double stair from the ground level entry to the main floor half a level above the street. The design, by David Eggleston, created a spacious uncluttered store interior, creating a more upmarket environment. The store weathered the difficulties of WWII, and immediately after became a leading fashion retailer, for instance offering Norman Hartnell designs in 1946. That same year Reta Findlay was made an associate director, joining an unheard of four females in senior management, heading what was by then a largely female staff.

The store kept up with the latest overseas trends, and invited designers to come out, such as Peter Russell and milliner Aage Thaarup, purchasing designs from them, and staging regular fashion parades. By the early 1950s the store catered to the cream of Melbourne society, and the show windows drew admiring crowds.

Georges developed a reputation for superior quality equal to that enjoyed by Harrods or Fortnum & Mason of London and Bergdorf Goodman of New York. The stores' staff handbook instructed employees to avoid high pressure sales techniques. Author and customer Annette Cooper states that Georges: "wanted to foster loyalty, and if they made you feel good about coming into the store you would come back." In the 1950s Georges became the exclusive retailer for Georg Jensen homewares, Waterford crystal and Liberty fabrics.

When Reta Findlay died suddenly in 1954, her status was such that her funeral was held in St Paul’s Cathedral, and Georges was closed for half a day.

The firm was taken over by retail holding company Cox Brothers in November 1960 through the purchase of all the ordinary paid up capital in Georges Holding Limited. Cox Brothers began to incur loses in 1962/63 and went into receivership in 1966. Georges was listed (again) as a new company on the Melbourne Stock Exchange as Georges Australia Limited.

In 1960 the store prepared to expand across Little Collins Street to the rear by buying the premises of Specialty Press, which had printed much of their promotional material. It had originally been built in 1891 as a Cyclorama, incorporating a large circular hall that displayed 360° paintings of famous scenes, such as the 1871 Siege of Paris. After a complete renovation, it opened the Hostess Store, for all the homewear departments. Soon after the basement of the main store was refurbished as a menswear department. The store also had an art gallery, first between 1945–48, then a larger space opened in 1963, along with the Georges Invitation Art Prize, won in the first year by John Olsen; the gallery was used for a wide range of exhibitions, from photography to ceramics, and embroidery to furniture.

In January 1970, Georges launched a successful takeover bid of Ball & Welch in a deal valued at $1.48 million. The directors of Georges believed that Ball & Welch stores would give Georges a foothold in the suburbs. The flagship Flinders Street store was sold in May, 1976, and ultimately only two outlets were retained as Georges branches; one in Burke Road, Camberwell, opening in 1977, and one in The Jam Factory on Chapel Street, South Yarra, opening in 1979.

The Sydney based department store David Jones then took over Georges in 1981, refurbishing the store and operating as it always had, but the prime position of the store slowly faded. The store was closed on 5 October 1995.

In 1996, work began to comprehensively refurbish the building to a design by Stephen Bennett and UK retail guru Terence Conran to create something like the successful Habitat stores in the UK. The atrium was reinstated but in modern materials, and the Edwardian walk-through windows were removed in favour of a reconstruction of the original Victorian shop windows. The new 'Georges' opened in 1998, but closed the following year. Since then various hospitality ventures have occupied the basement, retail has occupied the front ground floor section, and various businesses on the upper floors. From 2018 a major tenant was the co-working provider, Hub Australia.

== Published books ==
The store had such cachet that there have been four books written about it. In 1979 Keith Dunstan published The Store on the Hill, one year before the store's centenary. In 2003, the former head of visual merchandising Laurie Carew, with former model Diane Masters, published Behind the Glass, which they followed up with a second book Still Here in 2006. Annette Cooper’s Remembering Georges: stories from Melbourne’s most elegant store, a compendium of interviews with former staff and clients, was published in 2014.

The store had such cachet that four books have been written about it. In 1979, journalist Keith Dunstan’s The Store on the Hill was published to coincide with the store’s centenary the following year; in 2003, Behind Glass was published, written by former head of visual merchandising, Laurie Carew, with former model Diane Masters; in 2006, Still Here was published, also by Laurie Carew and Diane Masters; and, in 2014, Annette Cooper’s Remembering Georges: stories from Melbourne’s most elegant store was published, a compendium of interviews with former staff and clients.

== A family anecdote ==
The Powne family holds a personal connection to this day. William Powne was a migrant from Cornwall, England, who initially had a drapery business in Ballarat named Powne and Cray, and later worked for the George brothers when the store was still the Federal Emporium. In 1886, Powne gave notice that he would be leaving to start a drapery business in Clarendon Street, Melbourne. As a mark of esteem for Powne, the George brothers gave Powne a purse of sovereigns 'as a token of their respect and goodwill'. This kind act was perhaps so unusual, and the company so prominent, that it was reported in The Age on 14 September 1886.

These sovereigns have been passed down through William Powne's children and beyond, with the success story of George and George being front and centre.
