= Clive Evans =

Clive Evans may refer to:

- Clive Evans (footballer)
- Clive Evans (fashion designer)
