= Lachasse =

British couture firm

- Company type: Private company
- Traded as: Lachasse
- Industry: Fashion
- Founded: London, England (1928)
- Founder: Fred Shingleton
- Defunct: 2006
- Headquarters: London, England
- Key people: Digby Morton, Hardy Amies, Michael Donnellan, Owen, Peter Lewis-Crown
- Products: Couture, ready-to-wear (from 1981)

Lachasse was a British couture firm operating from 1928 until 2006, making it one of the longest surviving high fashion houses in London.

Part of the Incorporated Society of London Fashion Designers (IncSoc), it is notable for being a major training ground for British couturiers, numbering Digby Morton, Hardy Amies, and Michael Donnellan among its chief designers. Later it would train further designers, with names such as Stephen Jones and John Galliano passing through the couture house as trainees on their way to successful solo careers.

During the heyday of couture, Lachasse's customers included Princess Marina and Countess Mountbatten.

== Early history of the brand ==
Founded in 1928, Lachasse focused on the 1920s trend for sportswear. Some sources say it was established by a Mrs Philips, however the more prominent name behind the brand was Fred Shingleton. It was an offshoot of the couture house of Gray, Paulette & Shingleton – Paulette was a fashion house that had been bought by Shingleton. Writing in 1964, The Guardian fashion editor Alison Adburgham said: "People often ask, why Lachasse – there is no individual of that name, nor has there ever been. Lachasse was an offshoot... of a famous dress house in Berkeley Square called Paulette".

Its original designer was Digby Morton, who is credited with coming up with the name because, as he later said, British women wouldn't buy high-end fashion designs unless they sounded French. Morton's first women's collection for Lachasse introduced unusual colour combinations into Donegal tweed and reduced detailing so that the cut of the suit stood out. This transformed what had previously been considered staid country wear into something chic enough for town. As Alison Adburgham noted in 1964, Morton: "made it fashionable to wear tweeds in London". The elegantly cut daywear suit became one of the hallmarks of Lachasse and would be refined by later house designers.

=== Hardy Amies years ===
After five years, Morton set up his own label and he was succeeded at Lachasse by Hardy Amies, then a would-be designer and former Avery weighing machine salesman who had got the job of managing the store simply because a letter he wrote describing a dress came to the attention of Shingleton. Another telling of this story by Colin McDowell is that the letter Amies wrote was to his aunt – a vendeuse at a court dressmaker – and was describing the dress worn by Shingleton's wife at a dinner party Amies had attended. Amies' early pieces showed his lack of experience; later he would describe some of them as hideous and extravagant. In 1937, however, his tweed suit called 'Panic' scored a huge hit. Cecil Beaton photographed the suit for Vogue; it had padded hips, a nipped in waist (Amies had introduced corsets to the collection) and was made in green Linton tweed with a cerise pink check. By the time war broke out, Amies was designing the whole Lachasse collection.

== Post-war designs ==
In 1941, Michael Donnellan was named head of operations at Lachasse – while on wartime service – and became its chief designer after his return. Donnellan – more usually known as Michael or Michael of Carlos place – was an established name and his designs for Lachasse bore the label 'Michael of Lachasse'. Later he would be described as the Balenciaga of London for his focus on simplicity of form and defined tailoring. Such was his stature, and that of Lachasse during this era, that the house was included in a 1953 feature about London's "big 10" designers in a feature in Life prior to the coronation of Elizabeth II. This would be one of his last assignments for Lachasse as in 1953 he set up on his own, taking over the couture house of Peter Russell.

At Lachasse, the next head of design was Owen, who continued the tradition of fine tailoring that was a hallmark of the label, as seen in a red suit that now forms part of the V&A archive. Owen was described by The Guardian in 1964 as: "a titled Irishman who is sheltering under the pseudonym of Owen". Almost a decade earlier, The Times revealed that Owen was the "Marquess McSweney". Also among the company's design team during this era was Clive Evans – sometimes known simply as Clive – who would go on to become one of the hottest designers of the Swinging London scene.

=== Export drives ===
In common with other London couturiers, Lachasse participated in a variety of export drives – especially for the American market. Its tailored suits had some success internationally, especially after the Wall Street crash, when many American buyers looked to London rather than Paris for fashions because of its lower prices. In 1936, The Times reported a small fashion show held in New York to mark the arrival of the Queen Mary, at which Lachasse showed Scottish tweeds. Its new blue and red tweed was described as one of the "novelties". In 1951, The Guardian reporting from the IncSoc autumn shows said that Lachasse had been: "wildly, and rightly, complimented by the American buyers". That same season, its chenille coat drew applause from the buyers at the Venice fashion show.

With increased international focus on London fashion during coronation year, The Times reported on Michael of Lachasse's new lines, describing his "masher" (cutaway) jacket and narrow skirt inspired by Edwardian fashions as the "ace of trumps". It added: "No designer has done more than he [Michael of Lachasse] since the end of the war to show that London has not only impeccable tailoring to offer but also style, and new fabrics to be used in new ways". That same year, Lachasse – along with IncSoc members and wholesale houses such as Susan Small, Aquascutum and Simpsons – showed its fashion at St Moritz as part of an export drive organised by The Ambassador magazine.

== New ownership ==
In 1965, Peter Lewis-Crown, who had joined as an apprentice in 1948, became director of Lachasse. Subsequently, he took on ownership of the couture house and was also responsible for design. While this was an era when most of the London couture houses were struggling – with the explosion of a new crop of London designers and the rise of ready-to-wear – Lachasse retained a loyal clientele. The Times said, in 1966: "Lachasse's clothes are entirely undatable, and in that must lie the secret of his success with an obviously older clientele. Skirts are generally straight, often with kick pleats and firmly cover the knee". A critique of the London couture houses in 1967 – in which the author contrasted their work with that of designers such as Mary Quant and Jean Muir – noted: "Lachasse's collection was so far removed from the current fashion idiom to seem almost a museum piece. His clothes, built to the standards of elegance, taste and fit of years gone by, are obviously designed for the older woman who remembers and loves straight cut skirts, low, square necklines, draped bodices, hip bows and cuffed, bracelet-length sleeves".

Lachasse continued to restrict itself to couture until 1981, when it opened a small boutique at its Thurloe Place, Kensington premises selling ready-to-wear. Couture, however, was still its main business and in 1990, Liz Smith writing in The Times described it as one of the go-to places in London for bespoke clothing: "Peter Lewis-Crown today continues the house tradition for natty tailoring (a suit costs around £1,000) that looks little changed from the days when Princess Marina and the late Countess Mountbatten were customers".

=== Later designers ===
Lachasse continued to provide a training ground for London's young designers. Both milliner Stephen Jones and future Givenchy and Dior head designer John Galliano spent time training there. An article in Vogue by fashion journalist Hamish Bowles, who had himself served an internship at Lachasse in the 1980s, described fashion shows featuring cocktail dresses and Derby day suits shown to a clientele comprising ladies in waiting to the Queen and "Mayfair matriarchs", adding: "It was quaint, it was heaven, it was an insight into a world that seemed long vanished even then".

=== Legacy ===
Lachasse clothing is held in the archives of the V&A and the Fashion Museum, Bath. Among the items at the Fashion Museum, Bath is the Virginia Lachasse doll, a miniature mannequin created in 1954 for a London exhibition and equipped with an entire couture wardrobe, from daywear to bags, nylons and cigarettes. The doll was among the centrepieces of a 2007/8 V&A touring exhibition The Golden Age of Couture.
