= Maytime in Mayfair =

- Film poster
- Directed by: Herbert Wilcox
- Written by: Nicholas Phipps
- Produced by: Anna Neagle; Herbert Wilcox
- Starring: Anna Neagle; Michael Wilding
- Cinematography: Mutz Greenbaum (as Max Greene)
- Music by: Robert Farnon
- Production company: Herbert Wilcox Productions (as Imperadio)
- Distributed by: British Lion Films
- Release date: 12 September 1949 (general release)
- Running time: 94 minutes
- Country: United Kingdom
- Language: English
- Box office: £268,984 (UK)

Maytime in Mayfair is a 1949 British musical romance film directed by Herbert Wilcox and starring Anna Neagle, Michael Wilding, Nicholas Phipps, and Tom Walls. It was a follow-up to Spring in Park Lane.

The film was one of the most popular movies at the British box office in 1949.

== Plot ==
The film begins with a brief history of Mayfair then shows a man walking into a florist in Shepherd Market.

Debonair Michael Gore-Brown inherits a London fashion house: Maison Londres. Knowing nothing about business or fashion, he becomes romantically involved with its beautiful manageress, Eileen Grahame, who he says reminds him of Anna Neagle. He blithely helps himself to the petty cash to buy her lunch and brings in his ex-military cousin Sir Henry as a 'business advisor'. They are interrupted by the foppish D'Arcy Davenport, Eileen's fiancé.

A nearby rival fashion house learns of Eileen's new secret collection and leaks the story to the papers. It emerges that the cousin accidentally passed the story whilst drunk. Eileen angrily quits the business to work for the rival, who now plans to buy the business at a knock-down price. When she learns that Michael is about to do this, she returns to sort out the mess, and marries him.

== Cast ==
- Anna Neagle as Eileen Grahame
- Michael Wilding as Michael Gore-Brown
- Peter Graves as D'Arcy Davenport
- Nicholas Phipps as Sir Henry Hazelrigg
- Thora Hird as Janet
- Michael Shepley as Shepherd
- Tom Walls as Inspector Hennessey
- Max Kirby as Mr Keats
- Desmond Walter-Ellis as Mr. Shelley
- Tom Walls Jr. as Constable
- Doris Rogers as Lady Manbury-Logan-Manbury
- Mona Washbourne as Lady Leveson

== Costume Design ==
- Hardy Amies
- Charles Creed
- Norman Hartnell
- Mattli
- Molyneux
- Digby Morton
- Bianca Mosca
- Peter Russell
- Victor Stiebel

== Production ==
The film marked the fourth teaming of Anna Neagle and Michael Wilding.

After the film started shooting Tom Walls called Wilcox asking for a role. Wilcox put in a part of a policeman for the actor. Filming took place in January through to March 1949. Four lines of clothing were designed specifically for the film.

== Soundtrack ==
- Maytime in Mayfair

Music by Harry Parr Davies
Lyrics by Harold Purcell

- Amor

Written by Gabriel Ruiz and Ricardo Lopez
English Lyrics by Sunny Skylar

- Do I Love You?

Written by Bruno Bidoli, David Heneker and Don Pelosi

- I'm Not Going Home

Written by Kermit Goell and Fred Prisker

- The Moment I Saw You

Music by Manning Sherwin
Lyrics by Harold Purcell

== Reception ==
=== Box Office ===
The film was hugely popular in Britain. The Motion Picture Herald said it was the third most watched film of the year after The Third Man and Johnny Belinda. Neagle and Wilding were voted the most popular stars of the year in Britain. According to Kinematograph Weekly the 'biggest winner' at the box office in 1949 Britain was The Third Man with Maytime in Mayfair being a "runner up".

However even by December 1949 the film had not recouped its cost.

=== Critical reception ===
The New York Times called the film "nauseously Technicolored flimflam"; while TV Guide noted "The plot is about as simple as they come, but it's told so nicely that you can't help but be charmed. Wilding and Neagle are a sort of British Astaire and Rogers, playing well off each other in this lighthearted romp. The beautiful fashion designs, as well as glorious set decor, are well captured in the Technicolor photography."
