= Angele Delanghe =

Belgian fashion designer (d. 1971)

- Delanghe, c. 1945
- Born: Brussels, Belgium
- Died: 27 May 1971; Schruns, Austria
- Occupation: Fashion designer
- Notable credit: Member of Incorporated Society of London Fashion Designers

Angele Delanghe (sometimes Angèle Delanghe), was a Belgian fashion designer based in London who ran an eponymous label from the late 1930s to the mid 1960s and also produced couture designs for the West End department store Fortnum & Mason.

== Early career ==
Delanghe was born in Belgium and came to the UK in 1914, at the outbreak of World War I, as a refugee. She presented her first collection in London in 1939. While wartime interrupted the activities of all London's couture houses, fashion went on and the influential British Vogue editor Audrey Withers was described as being among her early fans. Delanghe was among the earlier members of the Incorporated Society of London Fashion Designers (IncSoc), joining in 1945 but withdrawing two years later due, reportedly, to financial difficulties.

=== Brand hallmarks ===
Delanghe was known for her soft tailoring and feminine gowns – particularly romantic eveningwear and wedding dresses. At a January 1947 fashion show – in which she shared space and billing with fellow IncSoc member Charles Creed – Delanghe featured draped and brocaded evening gowns with stiffened hems slightly raised at the front, while daywear was characterised by simple designs with high necklines and checked and plaid fabrics. Her designs had broad appeal, a fashion writer in The Times noting in 1948: "Angele Delanghe has built her collection on the three Balzac types – the unmarried girl, the woman of 30 and the woman of the world".

== Later career ==
By 1949, Delanghe was designing for Fortnum & Mason. Although she had resigned her membership of IncSoc, taking her out of the so-called "big ten" of British fashion designers, her work was still considered important enough to regularly feature in newspaper reviews of the couture shows. That year, she presented a collection featuring lightweight woollen suits with soft silhouettes, slim waists and pleated skirts. For the spring 1950 showed – designed for Fortnum & Mason – the reviewer noted her clever use of featherweight tweeds and worsteds, alongside cotton and linen and the fact that she had, as usual, designed with a focus on colour and suitability for the British climate.

Delanghe continued to service a loyal client base from her Bruton Street showroom throughout the 1950s, regularly announcing her new collections in the classified adverts section of The Times. She rejoined the Incorporated Society of Fashion Designers in 1961 – the first new member in eight years. A reviewer of her second show of the year noted that although she had established a reputation for beautiful workmanship and attracted a loyal client base to her salon in Bruton Street, this collection's harem skirts, knickerbockers and stiff silk taffeta gowns was "backward looking" and out of keeping with the contemporary mood towards soft and flowing fashions.

By this stage, Delanghe was part of the old guard, with a perspective of fashion design that was possibly out of keeping with the 1960s trend for androgynous shifts and mini skirts. She told a correspondent for The Times in January 1965 that models had neglected their waistlines, adding: "I had to interview more than 20 girls for the show before I found one with a waist as slender as 23 inches".

In 1966, Delanghe withdrew her membership from IncSoc – this at a time when the whole British couture industry was struggling due to high taxation, a shrinking customer base and the rise of ready-to-wear.
