= Pussy bow =

Scarf or neckcloth tied in a floppy bow

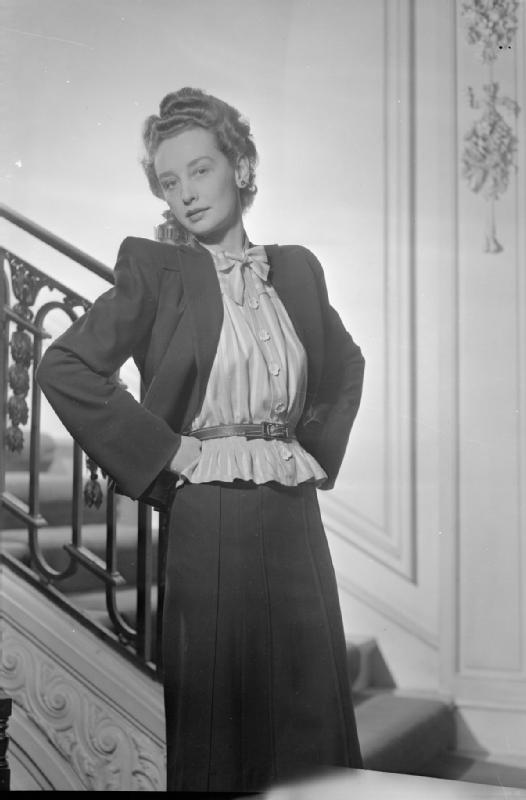
Pussycat bow blouse designed by Elspeth Champcommunal for Worth London, 1945

A lavallière, also called a pussycat bow or pussybow, is a style of neckwear worn with women's and girls' blouses and bodices. It is a bow tied at the neck, which has been likened to those sometimes put on "pussy cats".

== History ==
While bows at the neck had been worn since at least the 19th century; the term "pussy cat bow" took hold in the 20th century. It has been suggested that "There is always been something subtly subversive about the pussybow", and that it "evokes defiance". Kate Strasdin of Falmouth University says "Historically, it's associated with women who are starting to invade male spaces – the golf course, the workplace – and challenge traditional dress codes". The pussybow blouse is often paired with trousers.

=== The lavallière in 19th century France ===
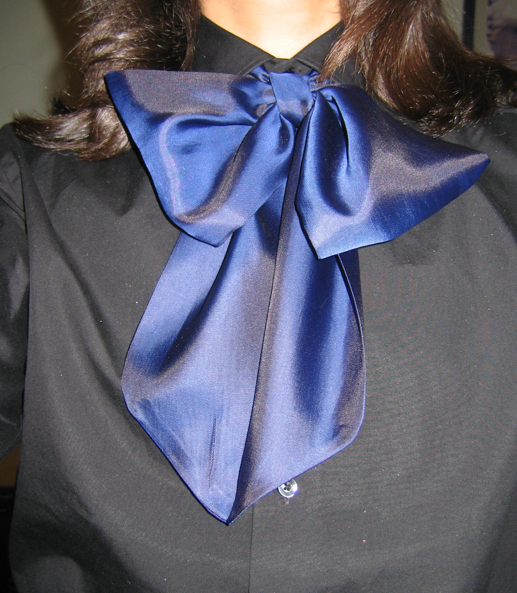
The lavallière

The lavallière is a type of cravat similar to the bow tie that was popularly worn in the 19th century in France. It is of similar fashion to the bow tie, but has a larger knot and drooping ends. The length of the scarf can be up to 1.60 metres (5.2 ft) and is knotted in the same way as a bowtie, but forms two falling shells and two free ribbons. The name is associated with the Duchess of La Vallière (mistress of Louis XIV). It was primarily worn by women, artists, students, and intellectuals associated with the political left in 19th century France.

=== 20th century ===
In 1934, the St. Petersburg Times offered a pattern for an Anne Adams dress featuring a convertible collar which could be worn in four different ways, including as "an intriguingly feminine pussy cat bow tied high under your chin." In 1947, pussy cat bows were part of the look inspired by Gibson Girls and 1890s fashions created by designers such as Omar Kiam.

Certain western films of the 20th century employed the pussy bow as a clothing accessory for cowboy characters. Jack Lemmon as Frank Harris in the 1958 film, Cowboy, is one such example.

By the 1960s, pussycat bows were a fixture in American fashion, having been incorporated by top designers like Coco Chanel and Yves Saint Laurent.

Meg Whitman, the former President and Chief Executive Officer of Hewlett-Packard, explained in a documentary that women began wearing the lavallière in place of a tie when entering the workforce in the 1960s.

During the 1980s, the pussycat bow blouse became a key part of Margaret Thatcher's political image after she became Prime Minister of the United Kingdom in 1979 and became closely linked with her. Thatcher reportedly said she thought bows were "rather softening" and "pretty", and at her funeral in 2013 Samantha Cameron, the Prime Minister's wife, paid tribute by wearing a pussy bow blouse. The Thatcher look was imitated by other female politicians.

=== 21st century ===
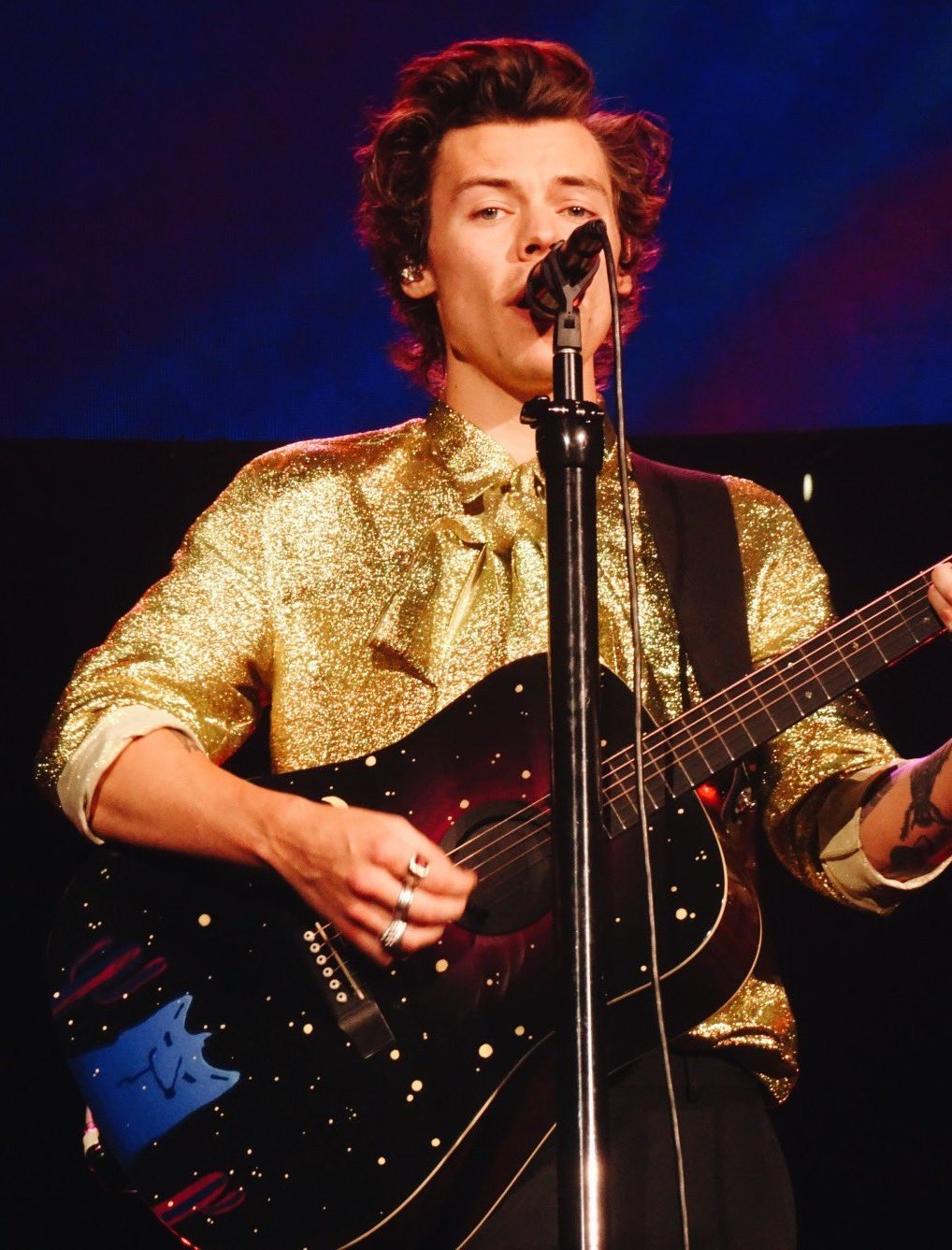
Musician Harry Styles wearing a pussy-bow blouse during a 2018 Live on Tour show in Saint Paul.

During the 2016 US presidential election, Melania Trump wore a Gucci pussy-bow blouse during the second presidential debate. This caused some to question if it was deliberate, coming just two days after her husband, Republican presidential nominee Donald Trump, was revealed to have spoken of being able to "grab them [women] by the pussy" in a video clip, which gained widespread attention and condemnation. Melania Trump wore a pussycat bow when discussing cyberbullying in August 2018, renewing speculation that she was trolling her husband.

In April 2018, women and men in Sweden took to wearing lavallière in support of Sara Danius, who had resigned from the Swedish Academy for her handling of the aftermath of a sexual assault incident involving Jean-Claude Arnault.

Throughout 2017 and 2018, UK musician Harry Styles wore pussy-bow blouses during his Live on Tour.

On November 7, 2020, U.S. Vice President-elect Kamala Harris wore a pussy-bow blouse with a suffragette white pantsuit at the Biden-Harris ticket's victory speech. Harris continued to frequently wear pussy-bow blouses during her 2024 presidential campaign.

== See also ==
- Ascot tie
- Collar (clothing)
- Cravat
- Louise de La Vallière
- Lavalier microphone
- Ève Lavallière
- Necktie
