= Victor Stiebel =

South African-born British couturier (1907–1976)

- Victor Stiebel, photographed by Cecil Beaton
- Born: 14 March 1907; Durban, South Africa
- Died: 6 February 1976 (aged 68); London, England
- Education: Jesus College, Cambridge
- Occupation: Couturier
- Partner: Richard Addinsell

Victor Frank Stiebel (14 March 1907—6 February 1976) was a South African-born British couturier. A founder member of the Incorporated Society of London Fashion Designers, he was among the top ten designers in Britain during the war and post-war years. Among his more notable designs were the uniforms for the Women's Royal Naval Service in 1951 and the going-away outfit for Princess Margaret's wedding in 1960.

== Early life and education ==
Victor Frank Stiebel was born in 1907 in Durban, South Africa. He arrived in Britain in 1924 to study architecture at Jesus College, Cambridge.

Having designed for theatre wardrobe at university, Stiebel worked as a dress designer for the House of Reville for three years, beginning in 1929. Founded by Wallace Reville Terry and Miss Rossiter, Reville (also known as Reville-Terry and Reville & Rossiter) was one of the foremost court dressmakers and fashion houses in London before the First World War. As was customary at the time, Stiebel learned the art of fashion design by working directly with a professional.

== Career ==
=== Pre-war ===
Stiebel opened his own fashion house at 22 Bruton Street, just off Berkeley Square in 1932. This proved so successful that he was able to expand the showroom to the Georgian ballroom next door within a year. He was assisted by his sister Noelle Stiebel, who managed much of the business's administration. The celebrated interior designer Syrie Maugham created the all-white decor that was her trademark style and Constance Spry—who later became a firm friend—supplied the flowers for the showroom and his twice-yearly fashion shows.

Stiebel became well known for his women's clothes and his use of striped fabrics. As reported in Vogue, "Stiebel has taken the lives and hearts and aspirations of Englishwomen and transmuted them into clothes, adding that touch of the artist, something that is rich and strange and exciting."

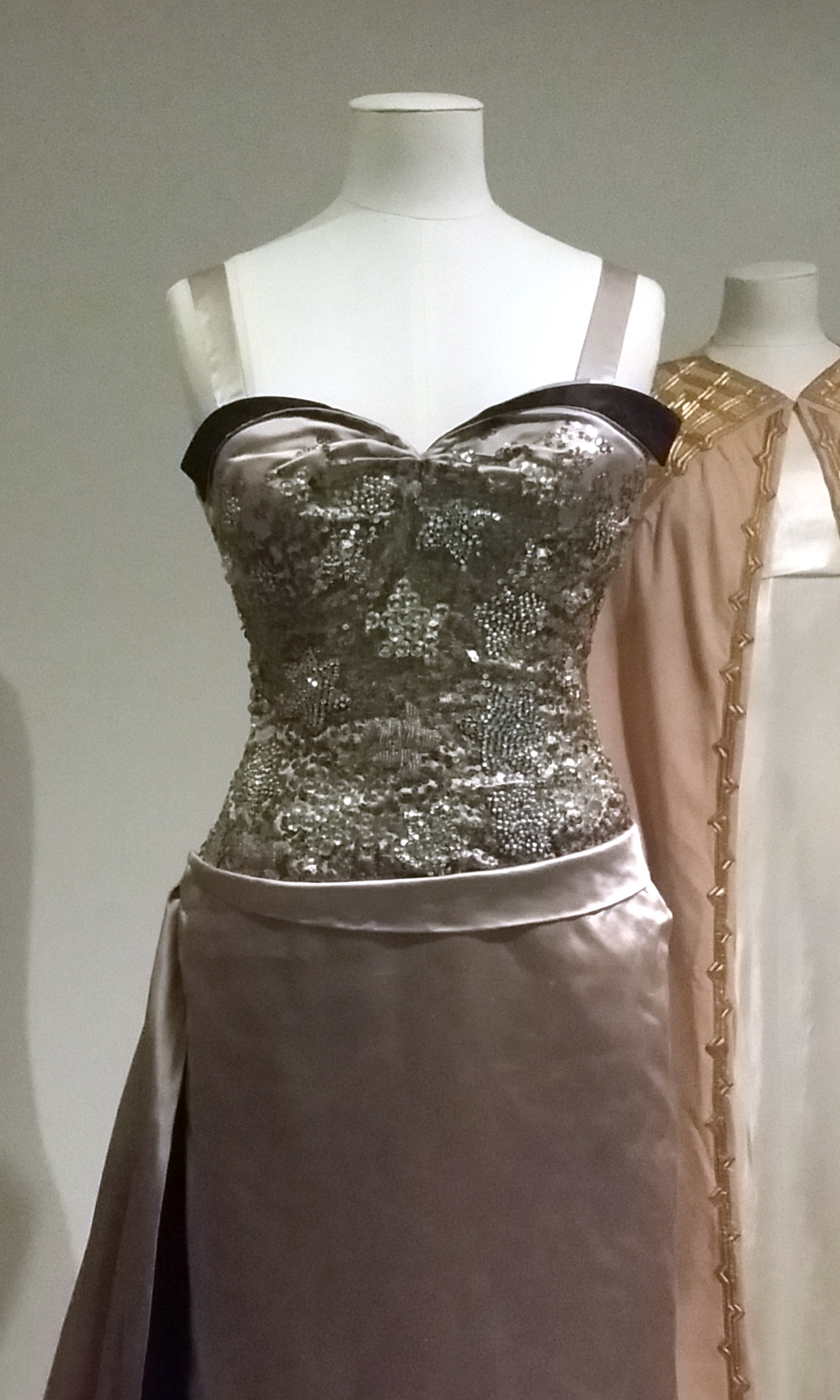
Evening dress, designed by Victor Stiebel, late 1950s. Fashion Museum, Bath.

=== Wartime and post-war ===
Stiebel enlisted for the Second World War in 1940, closing his house, but he was allowed to continue designing while involved with the services thanks to his involvement as a founder member of the Incorporated Society of London Fashion Designers, his designs being manufactured as part of the war effort using government stock fabrics. Called "Utility Fashion", each designer in the scheme produced a coat, dress, suit and shirt or blouse.

Stiebel returned to designing in 1946, succeeding Bianca Mosca as head of the house of Jacqmar, and becoming Chairman of the Incorporated Society of London Fashion Designers. He was commissioned to design new uniforms for the Women's Royal Naval Service (1951) and the Women's Royal Air Force (1954).

He reopened his own house in 1958, having great initial success, including designing the going-away outfit for Princess Margaret on her marriage to Lord Snowdon in 1960. Stiebel was forced to close the business in 1963, after just five years, having become unable to walk as a result of multiple sclerosis. Hardy Amies took on all 120 of Stiebel's employees.

Stiebel's clients included Katharine Hepburn and Vivien Leigh. Stiebel and Leigh also became close friends, as illustrated by his more than 100 letters in the Vivien Leigh Archive, housed in the Victoria and Albert Museum.

== Personal life ==
For many years, Stiebel lived discreetly with his romantic partner, the composer Richard Addinsell. In 1968, he published an account of his youth in South Africa.
