= Charles Creed =

British fashion designer (1909–1966)

- Born: Charles Southey Creed; 25 May 1909; Paris, France
- Died: 17 July 1966 (aged 57); Westminster, London
- Occupation: Fashion designer
- Spouse: Patricia Cunningham (m. 1948)

Charles Southey Creed (25 May 1909 – 17 July 1966) was a British fashion designer. Born into the longstanding tailoring house of Henry Creed & Company in Paris, he launched his eponymous label in London in 1946. The first elected member of the Incorporated Society of London Fashion Designers, he had success in both Britain and the United States.

== Early life and career ==
Creed was born in 1909 at 29 rue Singer in the 16th arrondissement of Paris, the sixth child and third son born to tailor Henry Creed (1824–1914). Like Charles Worth, the Creed family was British and became part of the French couture establishment, rising to prominence in the 19th century. His grandfather, also named Henry Creed, had introduced women's professional tailoring to Paris in the 1890s. The company – which said its tailoring roots dated back to the 1700s – had a reputation for creating fine women's riding habits as well as men's tailoring; clients included the British and French royal families. Creed's father was said to have designed the outfit worn by Mata Hari when she was shot.

Charles Creed was educated in France and Vienna, also spending some time as a designer with Bergdorf Goodman in New York, where he was said to have been very popular with clients. After a six-month spell completing his fashion industry education at Linton tweed mill in Carlisle – a key supplier to couturiers, notably Coco Chanel – he returned to work at the family firm in Paris in 1933. He retained a workspace in Knightsbridge during the early 1930s, which he shared with fellow designer – and later IncSoc member – Mattli. He was already considered notable enough in the United States to be chosen – alongside names such as Elsa Schiaparelli and Jeanne Lanvin – to design clothes for Frances Drake in the 1936 film version of I'd Give My Life. Creed was designing for the family firm in Paris at the outbreak of war, moving back in 1940 after the fall of France. He later described how he left Paris hours ahead of the Germans – with his father Henry Creed, then 80, refusing to evacuate the city where he had spent his life.

== Establishment of label ==
Charles Creed established his London showroom and workspace initially in Fortnum & Mason, moving to a basement air raid shelter once the London air raids started in earnest. In early 1941, he toured the United States to promote British woollens to American consumers and encourage them to support the war effort. He also contributed to the war effort as a member of the Incorporated Society of London Fashion Designers (IncSoc) in 1942. According to the fashion journalist Ernestine Carter, while Creed contributed to a 1941 collection with other IncSoc founding members, he was not among the eight founder members, but was the first elected member of the Society.

Creed opened his eponymous label in London in 1946. His 1947 collection – produced in a year when rationing was still in force in Britain – was greeted enthusiastically by a reviewer for Melbourne newspaper The Age, who described wool and jersey dresses with coordinating coats and box jackets, plus tailored suits in striped tweeds and black barathea worn with brightly coloured blouses. His 1947 range was also showcased in a British Pathé feature, alongside hats by Danish milliner to the Queen Aage Thaarup. Three years later, Creed's place among the British couture establishment was cemented by the inclusion of one of his suits in a fashion show sequence in the film Maytime in Mayfair – all the designers were IncSoc members.

Creed was well connected among broader fashion circles. His wife Patricia Cunningham had been appointed fashion editor of Vogue at the age of 23; a 1952 article in The Sydney Morning Herald about the women behind London's top designers described her as: "his severest critic", adding that she attended his fashion shows in order to take notes about hits and misses in the collection.

=== Brand hallmarks ===
Creed's store was located at 31 Basil Street, Knightsbridge. The premises was masculine in tone, with dark panelling on the walls and displays of Napoleonic toy soldiers (Creed had a fine collection that was later to be the subject of a British Pathé film). This love of military themes and detailing was to influence his designs, which featured frogging, braiding and piping. Capes and tricorn hats were also part of his design signature. While he did make some evening wear, designs were normally slim and tailored.

=== Legacy ===
Several years before his death, Creed had established a wholesale fashion house specialising in knitwear and planned to focus on this after the closure of his couture business in 1966.

After the closure of his couture house, he donated a selection of model garments to the Victoria and Albert Museum to illustrate his design style. His work was also exhibited as part of a 2007 V&A exhibition called The Golden Age of Couture. The family name lives on in the Paris perfume house of Creed.

== Publications ==
- Creed, Charles, Maid to Measure (Jarrolds, 1961)
- de la Haye, A., 'Material Evidence' in Wilcox, C. ed., The Golden Age of Couture: Paris and London 1947-1957 (V&A Publications, 2007), p. 96-7 & pl.4.6
