= Clive Evans (fashion designer) =

London fashion designer

- Born: 1933; London
- Occupation: Fashion designer
- Notable credit: Member of Incorporated Society of London Fashion Designers

Clive Evans, better known as Clive, was a London-born fashion designer of the 1960s who attracted a number of celebrity fans and was promoted internationally as a high fashion designer from Swinging London.

Operating initially as a couture designer – and at a time when fashion was undergoing a radical shift towards mass-market and ready-to-wear – he was described by The Times fashion editor Prudence Glynn in 1972 as: "the last flowering on the tree of British couture".

== Early life and career ==
Evans was born in London into a medical family, claiming six generations of doctors came before him. He chose not to follow family tradition and spent time in the navy, also training as a journalist and working as a porter.

Having completed a course at Canterbury College of Art Evans began his fashion apprenticeship with Michael of Carlos Place before working at Lachasse and John Cavanagh – all were members of the Incorporated Society of London Fashion Designers (IncSoc), giving him an impeccable grounding in the London couture scene. While working at Lachasse, he won both first and second prize in a design competition organised by the International Wool Secretariat.

After a spell working with Berketex (then a wholesale house) as an assistant within its ready-to-wear department, he showed his first collection in 1963 in a borrowed space.

== Eponymous label ==
By 1964, Evans was showing from his own salon just off Hanover Square and in August of that year he was elected as a member of IncSoc – bypassing the normal requirement to show at least four collections before being considered for membership. After this small (for the time) collection of 24 pieces was shown, The Sydney Morning Herald described him as "the man of the moment" in British fashion, also noting that, like his first mentor Michael of Carlos Place, he was tuned into the Balenciaga style. The reviewer added: "His tailoring is superb. His line is pure and his cut intricate." The Guardian's reviewers added further praise: "Clive's clothes have confident assurance...A young man must, indeed, have confident assurance and not a little courage to start a couture house these days when the whole drift of fashion is towards casual clothes and ready-to-wear."

The first full Clive collection was launched in January 1965. It was greeted warmly by the reviewer for The Times, who described it as setting "a mood of high sophistication" with its tunic suits, collarless coats with kimono sleeves and suits with culotte skirts. Eveningwear included sarong and sari-style dresses and an evening blouse made of chiffon and 30 yards of ribbon. The collection included shoes he'd designed and models wore straw turban hats made by Graham Smith with inbuilt slots to hold futuristic sunglasses made by Oliver Goldsmith.

Clive clothes soon attracted high-profile clients such as Lee Radziwill and a string of actresses – notably Cyd Charisse, Diane Cilento, Susannah York and Barbara Rush.

== Ready to wear clothing ==
In 1967, Clive signed an agreement with Cope Allman International to produce a ready-to-wear line, 'Clive Set', for the international market. The first collection was launched with transatlantic fanfare – beginning with a showing in London at 9.30 am, then a second showing on the flight to New York, before a final event on RMS Queen Elizabeth in New York Harbour.

Cope Allman's fashion division had decided to market Clive internationally because they saw him as representative of 'Swinging London' fashion – he was a keen supporter of the mini and unstructured shift dress, unlike many of his IncSoc contemporaries. The collection, which included casual summer suits, dresses with topcoats and jumpsuits, some topped with Graham Smith hats, was greeted positively by The Guardian reviewer, who said it was less bold than his couture designs but comprised "quiet clothes in well-chosen materials" and concluded it was likely to be well received on both sides of the Atlantic. From 1968, Clive Set clothes were available in the designer's Hanover Square store, as well as in the Oxford Street department store Peter Robinson.

=== Other commissions ===
By the late 1960s, Clive had diversified into producing film costumes alongside his work for couture and ready-to-wear clients. Indeed, in 1966 it was reported in The Times that he had postponed his London fashion shows and was busy designing costumes for a spy film about a journalist starring Cyd Charisse and Elsa Martinelli.

In 1969, he was chosen as the designer to launch a new leather substitute Porvair, created by British company Chloride Electrical Storage Company. While he was not known for his menswear designs, the dramatic garments he created led The Times journalist Antony King-Deacon to comment that he wished he would. Richard Smith of The Chelsea Cobbler and Glen Carr of Norvic created the faux leather shoes.

In 1970, Clive was chosen as designer of the new BOAC air stewardess uniform, designing a terylene and cotton mini dress in pink or turquoise colourway with streamlined space-age styling. He introduced trousers for the first time to the uniform, although these could not be worn in the cabin while serving passengers.

== Demise of fashion label ==
A year later, Clive's fashion collection was sponsored by the faux fur manufacturer Borg and, alongside the staple shift dresses that were a signature item, contained a large number of garments demonstrating the fur's potential uses. These included an extraordinary full-length evening dress in graduated shades of terracotta faux fur. A reviewer from the Sydney Morning Herald – the newspaper which less than a decade earlier described him as the man of the moment – was unimpressed: "Clive is chic and clever, but unfortunately not original this season...With the couture scene as fraught as ever with financial problems, it's inevitable that Clive cannot be as couture as he was".

The couture house of Clive closed in 1971 – the same year that Evans' first mentor Michael of Carlos Place shut his business – and Evans became a design consultant. A year later, he was working with the fashion house of Dorville and also producing clothes made of tweed from the Isle of Bute for a mail-order catalogue.
