= Mattli =

Swiss fashion designer based in London (1907–1982)

- Born: Gustav Joseph Mattli; 14 June 1904; Seelisberg, Switzerland
- Died: 9 February 1982 (aged 77); Curridge, Berkshire, England
- Other name: Jo Mattli
- Occupation: Fashion designer
- Organization: Incorporated Society of London Fashion Designers

Giuseppe Mattli (1907–1982), usually known as Mattli or Jo Mattli, was a Swiss-born and London-based fashion designer known for his couture designs and, later, his ready-to-wear clothing and couture patterns.

A member of the Incorporated Society of London Fashion Designers (IncSoc) – making him a key player in shaping London's post-war couture industry – he was characterised by British Vogue in March 1953 as a go-to designer women could trust: "Mattli's clothes have charming wearable qualities...One feels he cares more about dressing women than putting over fashion themes, good though his are."

== Early life and career ==
Giuseppe Gustavo Mattli was born in Locarno, Switzerland and grew up in the Italian-speaking southern city of Lugano as one of a family of 14 children (12 of them were girls). Mattli's career began as an apprentice to an oil company in Switzerland, but he moved to England in 1926 to learn English and acquire tailoring skills. He continued his training in Paris, working at the fashion house of Premet, returning to London to open his own couture house in 1934. Within four years he was showing in Paris, but the outbreak of war meant a return to London.

Mattli's first wife Olga, whom he married sometime before 1934, was one of his models and also designed hats for some of his gowns. His French-born second wife Claude, whom he married in 1947, had worked as a model for Ardanse, Desses and Jean Patou before moving to London and working for the Free French. An article in the Sydney Morning Herald on the women behind London's top designers, described her as 'director-vendeuse' (head of sales) and occasional model for evening gowns – also noting that the "beautiful" Claude was a keen housewife but Jo Mattli was the chef in their flat in Kensington.

== Couture house ==
Mattli was among the earliest members of IncSoc and, in common with other major London couturiers, was involved in promoting British fashion designed around utility principles during and immediately after the war. Once the strictures of rationing were relaxed, IncSoc set out to promote its role, and that of British couture as a rival to Paris. One of Mattli's outfits – an elegant silk cocktail gown – was included in the fashion show sequence in the popular 1949 comedy Maytime in Mayfair. He shared premises in Knightsbridge with fellow IncSoc member Charles Creed after the war.

London couturiers were kept busy creating gowns for debutantes and society matrons in the run-up to the 1953 coronation of Queen Elizabeth. Mattli was among the so-called "big ten" designers photographed for lavish features in Life. As Vogue highlighted, Mattli was perhaps more at home creating practical and wearable fashion focusing on understated fine detailing. His autumn 1952 collection – singled out by one fashion commentator as one of the best of the season – included traditional Donegal tweed coats and slimline afternoon and cocktail dresses in bouclé wool, silk jersey and lace.

== Ready-to-wear fashion ==
In 1955, the company Mattli worked with went into liquidation, signalling his move away from couture and into ready-to-wear clothing. Unlike many of the other IncSoc members, Mattli's name remained familiar throughout the 1960s and early '70s, not only on ready-to-wear clothing but also the burgeoning sewing pattern market – the signature 'Jo Mattli' appeared on many patterns for Vogue's couturier series and he told The Guardian that the royalties from these patterns had helped support his couture business. He was also an expert contributor to the 1967 BBC sewing series Clothes that Count, helping to customise a shirtwaister pattern for a keen sewer who appeared on the programme and also contributing to the Radio Times features that accompanied the series.

By 1973, Mattli was running a 'Continental boutique' on the premises where his couture house had once stood. Retaining a small number of workroom staff for alterations, he was presenting collections selected from Swiss, Italian and French houses, including designers such as Nina Ricci. He described this move into ready-to-wear as meeting the needs of modern women, who wanted fashion immediately that could be changed frequently: "I have come to the conclusion that couture has now outlived its purpose". Mattli's name as a London couturier still carried weight and he collaborated with the designer Christopher McDonnell in 1980 for an autumn collection – Christopher McDonnell for Mattli.

Mattli retired to the village of Curridge, Berkshire, where he died in 1982.

== Legacy ==
There are examples of Mattli's work in the Victoria and Albert Museum and the Fashion Museum, Bath has an archive of press books and sketches, as well as a small number of garments. He is the subject of a thesis entitled Famous, Forgotten. Found: rediscovering the career of London couture fashion designer Giuseppe (Jo) Mattli, 1934-1980 by textile conservationist Dr Caroline Ness. University of Glasgow has been working with the Fashion Museum, Bath to create a catalogue and database to provide researchers with access to material about Mattli's 30-year-plus involvement with the British high fashion industry.
