= Digby Morton =

Irish fashion designer based in London (1906–1983)

- Digby Morton, 1949
- Born: Henry Digby Morton; 27 November 1906; Dublin, Ireland
- Died: 5 December 1983 (aged 77); London, England
- Occupation: Fashion designer
- Notable credit(s): Aberfoyle International Fashion award, New York, 1956

Henry Digby Morton (1906–1983) was an Irish fashion designer and among the leading names of British couture in the period from 1930-50. He was also among the pioneers of ready-to-wear fashions in the 1950s. Successful on both sides of the Atlantic, he redefined women's suits and tailoring, earned himself the moniker 'Daring Digby' for his US fashion venture and helped to establish the Incorporated Society of London Fashion Designers, an early forerunner of the British Fashion Council.

His contemporary Hardy Amies said of Morton: "[His] philosophy was to transform the suit from the strict tailleur, or the ordinary country tweed suit with its straight up and down lines, uncompromising and fit only for the moors, into an intricately cut and carefully designed garment that was so fashionable that it could be worn with confidence at the Ritz".

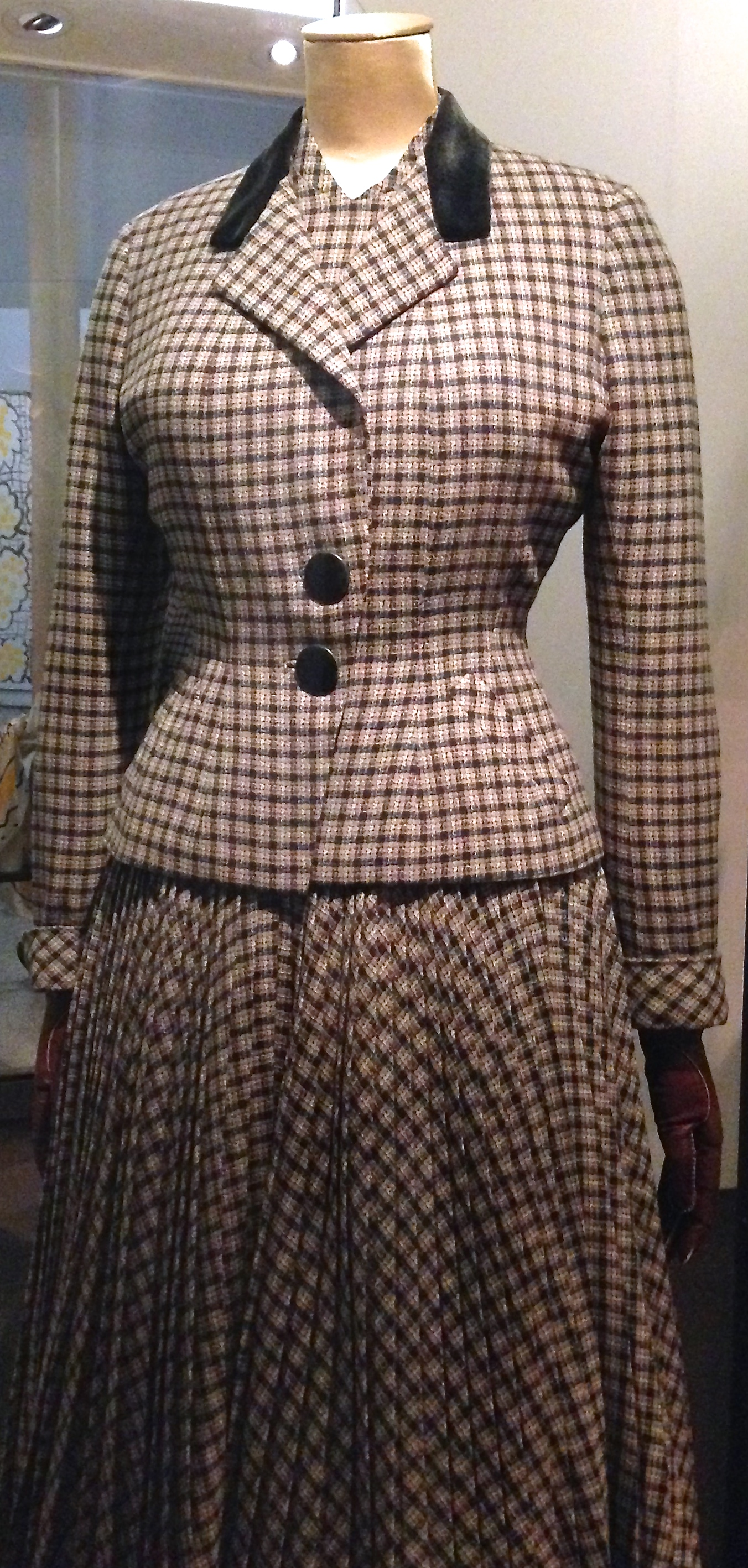
Digby Morton checked jacket and dress ensemble from 1948-9, part of the Victoria and Albert Museum archive

== Background and early career ==
Henry Digby Morton was born in Dublin, the son and grandson of accountants for the Guinness brewing organisation. He studied architecture at Dublin Metropolitan School of Art, moving to London in 1923.

Working first at Selfridges and Liberty, he then moved on to the fashion store Jay's as a sketch artist recreating Paris designs to appeal to London customers. By 1928, he'd become designer for couture house Gray Paulette & Shingleton – bringing both his own staff and his design flair. He suggested that it be rebranded as Lachasse – he later said this was because British women wouldn't accept any designs without a French-sounding name. Lachasse specialised in sportswear – a key 1920s trend – and Morton created a debut collection featuring Donegal tweed in what were then radical colour combinations such as bright greens and pale blues blended with traditional browns. This updated hitherto 'stuffy' country tweeds into smart town clothing, especially as Morton also streamlined the cut and tailoring to make the suits more fitted and fashionable. He left Lachasse after five years (he was succeeded by Hardy Amies) in order to set up his own couture house. He married the editor of Woman and Beauty Phyllis Panting (known professionally as Anne Seymour) in 1936.

== Wartime and post-war career ==
Digby Morton remained active during the war as a couturier, charging at least £25 for a good quality tweed suit. But he also responded to the wartime need for well designed and affordable clothing. As a founder member of the Incorporated Society of London Fashion Designers (IncSoc), he was among those invited by the Board of Trade to design for wartime, respecting the strict guidelines of rationing and utility. His contributions included designing outfits for the WRVS. Among his other notable wartime creations was a designer version of the siren suit (a utility boilersuit designed for air raids and work) commissioned by Viyella and made in its cotton/wool mix fabric.

Morton – along with other members of IncSoc – also designed costumes for a number of British films, including the wartime production Ships with Wings and post-war movies Maytime in Mayfair and The Astonished Heart. Showcasing the work of couturiers was seen as a way to convince other manufacturers and the general public of the fashion value of utility designs.

=== American and ready-to-wear ventures ===
After the war, Morton re-opened his couture house, but already recognised that ready-to-wear would be the future of fashion. It was this period of his career when he gained greatest acclaim. In 1953, US manufacturer Hathaway asked Morton to describe a women's range. He copied men's shirts, tailored and adjusted for the female form and made in bright colours with contrasting bowties. The success of this innovation landed him the Time magazine epithet: 'Daring Digby'.

In 1957, Morton closed his London couture house and set up another UK venture Reldan-Digby Morton (later Reldan), with the fashion producer Mick Nadler, who had inherited the company Reldan, (Surname Nadler spelt backwards) from his father Nathan Nadler, who had originally started the company after the First World War from premises in Brick Lane, East London. Reldan invented the capsule collection for Mary Wilson, wife to Harold Wilson, prime minister in the 1960’s. When Mick Nadler died suddenly, Morton took over. The brand was successful on both sides of the Atlantic and created the aura of couture in ready-to-wear styles.

Never a lover of ostentation – he referred to evening wear as debutante clothes – Morton took his love of fine tailoring into menswear, setting up Digby Morton Menswear in 1963 in association with the German chemical firm Hoechst. Here he was able to produce a range of casual "easy-care" clothing, taking advantage of the firm's recently-developed Trevira wash-and-wear fibre, and used the same skill he'd displayed on women's suiting to break conventions.

Morton and his wife retired to the Cayman Islands, where he pursued his interest in painting and became an active member of the island's visual arts society.

== Archive ==
Morton's work was exhibited as part of a 2007 Victoria and Albert Museum exhibition called The Golden Age of Couture. His work is also part of the V&A archive.
