= Peter Russell (fashion designer) =

English fashion designer (1886–1966)

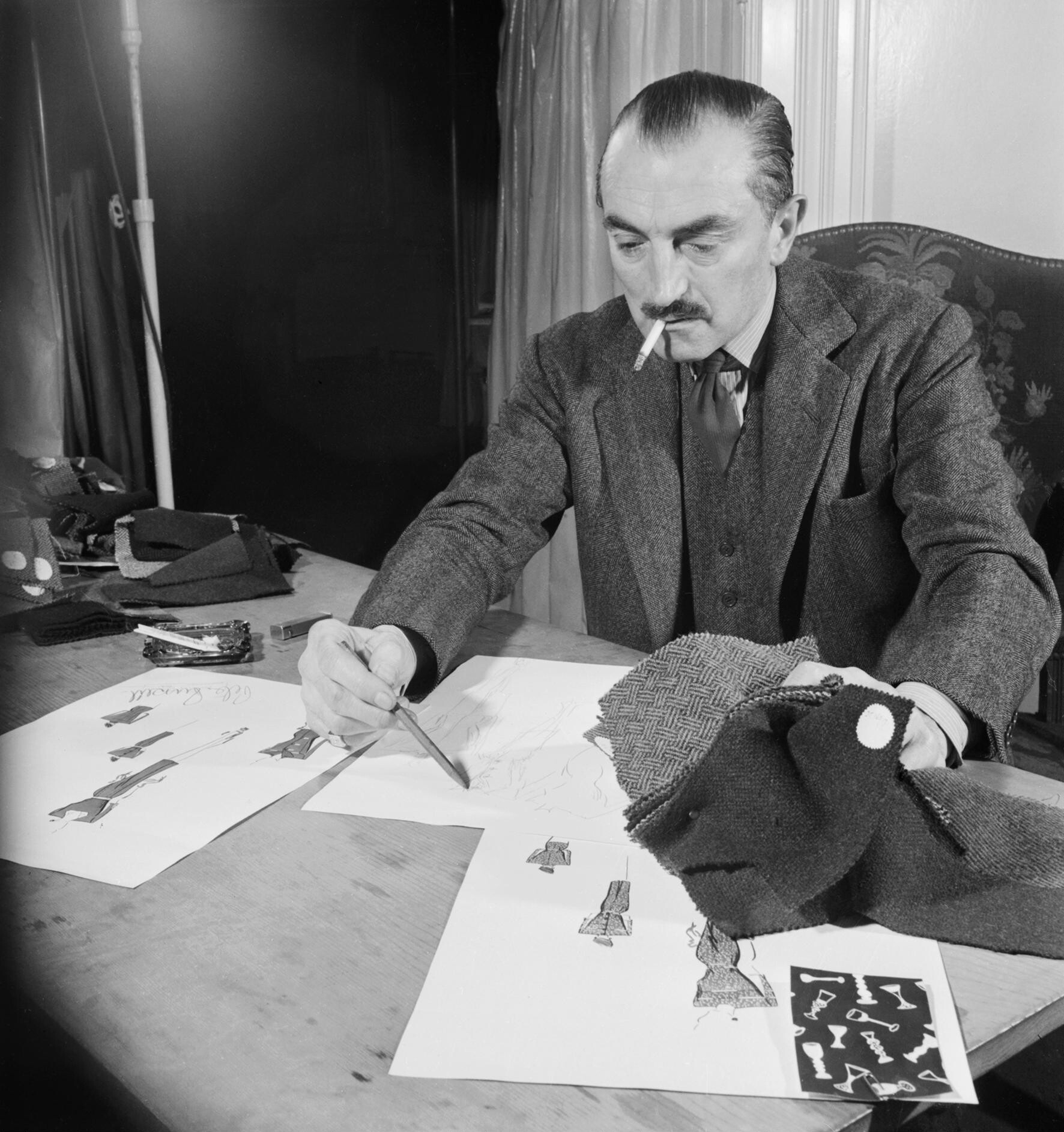
- Peter Russell at work in 1944.>
- Born: Thomas Christmas Russell; 1886; Cawston, Norfolk, England
- Died: 1966 (aged 99–100); Folkestone, England
- Occupation: Fashion designer

Peter Russell (1886–1966) was a London based English fashion designer and a founder member of the Incorporated Society of London Fashion Designers. Running a major couture house from the 1930s to the early 1950s, he has been described as a: "designer of beautiful, jauntily sophisticated women's suits".

== Background ==
Peter Russell black dinner frock, produced during wartime and photographed by the Ministry of Information to promote the idea that utility could be incorporated into even high fashion

Russell did not reveal much about his early life, although an article in the Sydney Morning Herald of 1953 states that before embarking on a career in fashion he was a horse rancher in Saskatchewan, Canada, a rubber planter in Malaya and a farmer in Norfolk, England. An article in the 1948 edition of Shopping placed his background in rural Norfolk and revealed he had served in the Royal Field Artillery in World War I before being injured. The article also stated that he first developed his design skills while working in Malaysia, initially by assisting the wife of a fellow rubber planter in creating a gown for the government house ball.

Researchers for the Victoria & Albert Museum have confirmed much of the above, and clarified that Russell was born Thomas Christmas Russell in Cawston, Norfolk in 1886, Russell moved to Canada in 1909 where he worked as a farmhand. In 1913 he was back in England, working for the costumiers Henry Reece Ltd, in Marylebone, London. Following his war service, and a short-lived marriage to Caroline Hilda Onions in 1918 (annulled in 1919), Russell moved to Malaya. By 1930, having assumed the name Peter, Russell had set himself up as a London dressmaker titled 'Peter Russell of Peter's Studio.' He relocated to Bruton Street the following year, and by 1934, 'Peter Russell Limited' also had a salon in Paris.

== London career ==
Peter Russell's first establishment was based at 82 Park Road, London. He relocated to 1 Bruton Street in 1931. In 1937 he moved again to 2 Carlos Place, Mayfair – one of the most fashionable quarters of London. Russell specialised in sporty suits and simple gowns.

His chief assistant, Scottish-born Isa Macdonald, had studied at Chelsea School of Art and over time rose to become business manager and director – the Sydney Morning Herald described her as a key player, saying: "Miss Macdonald dominates the House of Peter Russell". The house also employed Michael Sherard – who would later set up his own successful couture house – as an assistant before World War II.

Russell's love of outdoor pursuits and his former career as a rancher and farmer made him a distinctive character in the London high fashion scene and he cut a rather stern Edwardian figure in the 1950s portrait by Norman Parkinson now held by the National Portrait Gallery. His passion was hunting and he has also been described as "macho". He caused something of a stir, especially in Australia, for advocating a return to Edwardian-style dress for men in the early 1950s. It was advice he took himself, wearing stovepipe trousers, red cummerbund and matching carnation for one of his fashion shows in Melbourne.

The opera singer Ruth Vincent defected to Norman Hartnell because of Russell's "uneven temper". Nonetheless, his attention to detail meant his client list was said to include royalty and London's best-dressed women and many stores across the Commonwealth would buy Peter Russell collections unseen. He always dyed fabrics to his own specifications, often supervised the weaving and would create custom-dyed accessories to match.

Self-taught, his working style – as profiled in Shopping – was to come up with an idea and then design between ten and 20 sketches to fine tune it. At his twice-yearly fashion shows, he was described as marching up and down the showroom providing a running commentary: "turning the girls this way and that if necessary, and generally explaining down to the last button just what goes to make a Peter Russell model. He practically never stops talking, but his monologue is refreshing, interesting and ceaselessly patterned with that indestructible self-assurance of the super-craftsman."

=== Brand hallmarks ===
Russell believed in functional elegance. He was compared to Edward Molyneux for his ability to design elegant and practical clothes. He avoided grand ballgowns, favouring instead separates and suits as well as afternoon dresses and pieces for what he termed "diners out" (these outfits would be suitable for afternoon and cocktail parties as well as theatre visits). He could be dismissive of fashion trends, saying in 1953: "Dior's short hemline is a stunt – most women want simple, elegant clothes with just a touch of intrigue".

== IncSoc and wartime activities ==
Russell played a major role in promoting London couturiers. He was among the founder members of the Incorporated Society of London Fashion Designers (IncSoc) in 1942. He supported fashion's role in the war effort, championing utility principles and featuring in morale-boosting promotional photographs issued by the Ministry of Information. Although the couture industry was forced to alter both the quantity and the lavishness of fabrics used, it appears Russell heartily approved of the results of wartime rationing of fabrics. In a letter to the director general of the Board of Trade he suggested that it had made a vast improvement to fashion because it had taught people about discipline in dress and helped them appreciate simplicity.

After the war, Russell continued his involvement with IncSoc and the promotion of British couture. In common with fellow members, one of his outfits was included in a fashion show sequence in the 1949 film Maytime in Mayfair. One of his last commitments, in March 1953, was to be photographed with the so-called "big ten" designers (by this time numbering eleven) for a lavish feature in Life magazine about the preparations for the coronation of Queen Elizabeth.

== Move to Australia ==
Russell began his association with Australia in the late 1940s, when he was invited to show his collection at upmarket Melbourne department store Georges, with some lines also being produced in Australia under his supervision by the store. The same store then invited him to design a line of coronation gowns, suitable for Australian women to wear for the forthcoming coronation and subsequent royal tour of Australia. In July 1953, Russell finalised the sale of his business to Michael Donnellan in order to relocate to Melbourne. He was moving from fashion design to a fashion advisory role – working with a clothing firm that made wool and silk fabrics and lingerie.

Russell was in his mid-60s in 1953 and told the Australian press he was looking forward to: "a little time to think and to enjoy life". It was also announced he would settle in the suburb of Ivanhoe, Victoria in a Spanish style villa where he would be in close proximity to both the mills he was advising and also the Lilydale and Melbourne hunts. However, after moving out in August, Russell returned to Britain in November, at which point he seems to have retired.

Russell died in Folkestone in 1966.
