= Aage Thaarup =

Danish-born milliner

- Born: Aage Gjerfing Thaarup; 1906; Copenhagen
- Died: 11 December 1987 (aged 80–81); Chelsea, London
- Occupation: Milliner
- Notable credit(s): Royal Warrant to the Queen, 1961

Aage Thaarup (1906–1987) was a Danish-born milliner who ran a celebrated hatmaking business in London between the 1930s and 1970s.

Among his notable clients were the Queen Mother and Queen of the United Kingdom – for whom he designed the bearskin tricorn worn at the annual Trooping the Colour parade. When this famous hat was displayed at an exhibition in 2003, Suzy Menkes said in The New York Times: "There is a particular combination of madness and dignity to the dashing tricorn that Aage Thaarup created".

There was certainly an eccentric element to many of Thaarup's hats – he once created a design modelled on the Royal Albert Hall for a British Pathé news feature – but this was underpinned by hat design skills garnered from a long apprenticeship in Copenhagen, Delhi, Paris and Berlin. During a more than 40-year career, he was beset by financial difficulties on more than one occasion and still retained a loyal customer base – not least The Queen. His Times obituary noted: "He was not hardened by fame or fortune. He wore a cheerful disposition and a bow-tie always at a ten-to-four angle".

== Early life and career ==
Aage Gjerfing Thaarup was born in Copenhagen, the second of four sons in a family of modest means. He wanted to be a schoolteacher, but his parents could not afford to pay his college fees so he got a job in the hat department of Fornesbeck, then Copenhagen's largest department store. Although this was intended to be a stopgap, he remained there for three years and decided he liked working with hats. After getting an education grant, which he supplemented with English teaching and fashion drawing, Thaarup worked for a spell in both Berlin and Paris – in Paris he got a job at the renowned hatmaking salon Maison Lewis. He had no hatmakers in his family, but would later say that his grandmother had made shoes for Queen Alexandra

Moving to London – on a one-way ticket using borrowed money – he sold hats for a time as a commercial traveller, but found he could not make enough to live on. An army officer who had recently returned from India suggested he try his luck there. He borrowed more money and travelled first class to Bombay, selling hundreds of hats during the voyage and building up a client base. Travelling on to other Indian cities, he continued making hats, getting help with construction and materials (many of which were improvised) from the men who sewed for a living in India's bazaars.

A 1961 profile in The Observer recalled that, while there was an endless succession of society heads needing hats during the days of The Raj and the season meant following society from Bombay to Delhi, Lahore and the Khyber Pass – taking in polo matches and garden parties along the way – Thaarup was living hand to mouth during this time. Nonetheless, he made his mark; a milliner in Lahore still (in 1961) had a sign painted above his shop bearing the legend: 'Noor Mohammed, late of Aage Thaarup (London & Paris) Model Hats'.

== Establishment of salon ==
Returning to London in 1932, Thaarup set up shop in cramped upstairs rooms just off Berkeley Square. His reputation grew by the hat and he began attracting London society customers – including Wallis Simpson.

While Thaarup's sewing skills were very limited – he relied on his assistants to actually make the hats and told The Observer he could barely mend a hole in his own sock – he could match the hat to the occasion, the outfit and the wearer. This flair would mean he later moved his business to Grosvenor Street and began exporting his hats to high-end stores such as Lord & Taylor in New York. His fashion shows were memorable, and events such as his surrealist-inspired show in New York in 1936 earned him the title "The Mad Hatter". His house in Chelsea attracted other creatives and some became contributors to the short-lived magazine Pinpoints he launched in 1938.

Thaarup could not enlist during the war – he was lame and also a Danish national – but he continued to design hats, some of which aimed to help the war effort. In 1941, he attracted press coverage for creating the London Pride hat – a model adorned with the saxifrage that thrived on bombsites created by the London Blitz. It was said he planned to send shipments of the hats all over the world and a reporter from The Sydney Morning Herald gushed: "It has taken a Dane to turn 'London Pride'...into a symbol."

In 1943, Thaarup lost a well-publicised libel case against the publishers of the magazine Lilliput. It juxtaposed (on facing pages) a picture of him and one of his flower-decorated hats with the caption: 'I only wanted a few pansies' with another image of a gardener holding a garden fork with the caption: 'Keep out of my garden'. While his counsel had argued that this might imply he was a "degenerate who should be shunned by all right-thinking members of society", the defendant successfully argued that there was no defamatory intention. At this time, the word 'pansy' was a slang term for a gay man and the decriminalisation of homosexual acts was more than 20 years away. In July 1943, the Court of Appeal ordered that there were sufficient grounds for a new trial. Thaarup's reputation survived – by 1950, he was chairman of the Association of London Millinery Designers and that year helped to choose suitable headgear for the WRAF in company with an air marshal, an air chief marshal and an air commandant.

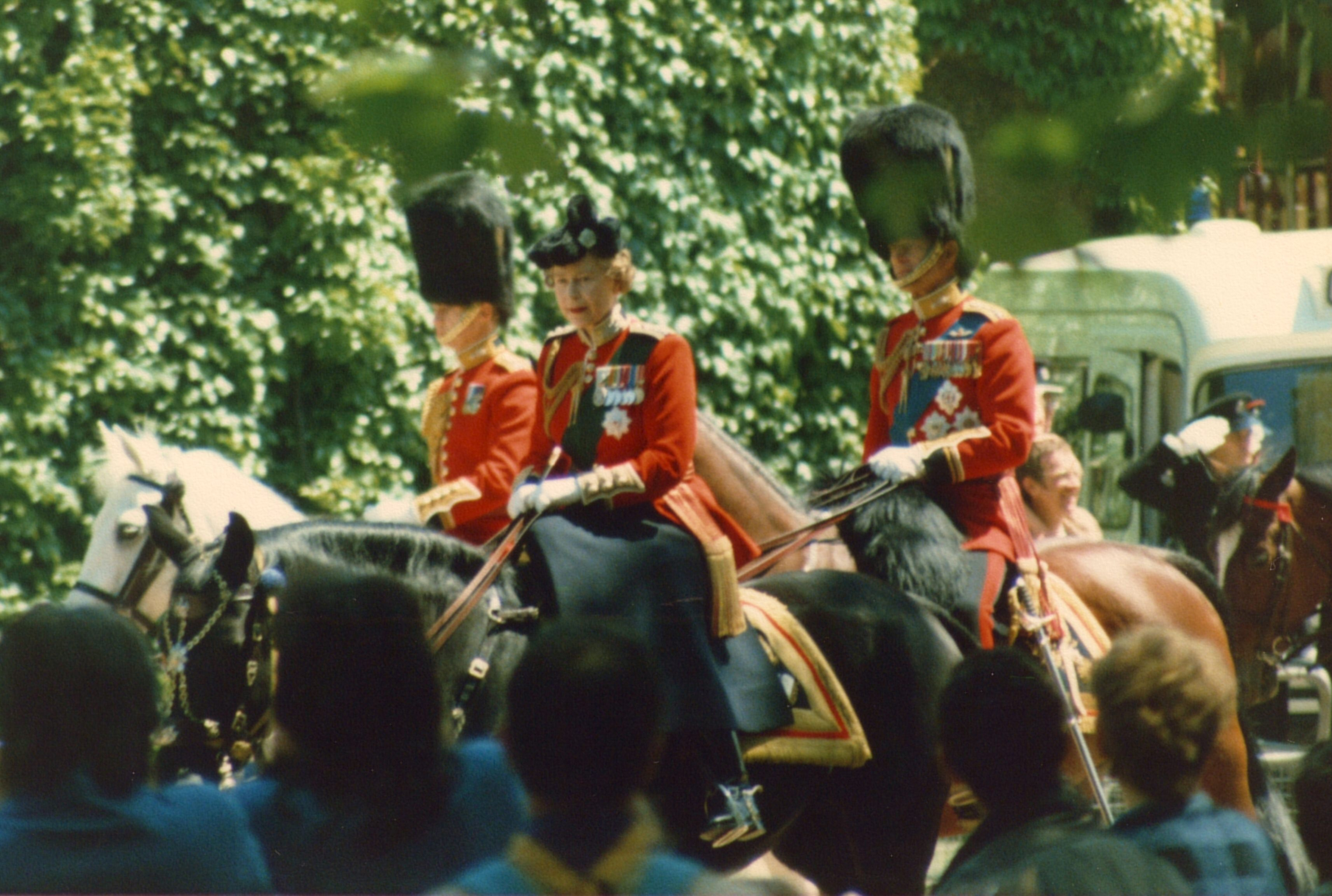
Aage Thaarup designed the bearskin tricorn hat worn by the Queen at the annual Trooping the Colour parade

== Hats for royalty ==
His most prestigious customer in the early years was undoubtedly the Duchess of York Elizabeth Bowes-Lyon (later queen consort) and he was the first to design the wide-brimmed hat with veil that became her favoured style – her daughter and a future loyal customer Princess Elizabeth used to attend some fittings.

For George VI's 1947 tour of South Africa, Norman Hartnell and Thaarup prepared the queen consort's garments by numbering every outfit and matching hat to ensure there was no confusion. Thaarup also had to consider the vagaries of the climate in his designs – hat pins that resisted rust and fabrics that wouldn't be irresistible to insects. He also included hats with ostrich feathers – a major South African export and highly prized by the garment and millinery industries.

=== Elizabeth II's hats ===
As milliner to Elizabeth II – and referred to as such by many media sources during the 1950s although his official Royal Warrant was not formally granted until 1961 – Thaarup was responsible for many hats captured in film and photographs. For official engagements, he had to design models that stayed on, co-ordinated with the Queen's outfits and revealed her face to onlookers and the world's press. He said: "In making a hat for a royal lady, one needs to bear in mind the need for the royal face to be visible. But the hat must be contemporary and reflect what is attractive in personal taste."

At the Trooping of the Colour, the replacement of the monarch's traditional bearskin with a tricorn cap with osprey plume was considered contemporary when Princess Elizabeth first wore it in 1951 (standing in for her father who was unwell). But it was also a practical modification, being more lightweight, and a contemporaneous account by the BBC said Thaarup had based it on an 18th-century regimental design, with the addition of the feather to soften what was otherwise a man's cap.

== Other notable commissions ==
Thaarup had many friends with cash to spare. On one occasion, the hotelier Victor Sassoon bought his whole hat collection to give to the female guests at his Christmas house party. While Thaarup had many A-list clients, he also designed more functional mass-market lines, including the 1950 cap design for the Women's Royal Army Corps walking out uniform. He was in good company, since Edward Molyneux designed the uniform's beret and Norman Hartnell took charge of the uniform itself.

He also designed factory caps and many models for high-street stores. These included ranges for Finningans in Bond Street and Marshall & Snelgrove Thaarup was also highly active in promoting his name throughout his career – not only appearing in numerous British Pathé films, but also visiting high-street stores that stocked his non-bespoke hats twice a year to personally sell to the public both his own designs and those of his competitor milliners.

He became known for inspired marketing gimmicks, such as the doll-sized hats created as gift tokens in 1956 – these could be exchanged for a full-sized model from his store. The following year the hat gift tokens were placed inside Easter eggs.

=== Financial worries ===
Despite his marketing successes, Thaarup had financial difficulties throughout his career. In 1940–42 his business went into administration for the first time – partly as a result of wartime trading conditions – although unlike clothing hats were not rationed. As business improved, he launched a small wholesale business and, by 1944, he was described as "Britain's leading hat designer" and quoted saying that women were asking for: "more thrilling models". The reporter also noted that his recent success has been based on Regency and Chinese-influenced designs for the home market. Two years later, a British Pathé film showcased his latest line of Tudor-inspired hats.

In 1955, he was declared bankrupt – something The Times attributed to overtrading – although Thaarup's generosity to his circle may have been a contributory factor. Thaarup said at the hearing that he had been helping friends and relatives in Denmark. After the bankruptcy hearing was over, his friends clubbed together so that he could spend the weekend in The Ritz. It was noted in The Times after his death that the patronage of the British royal family continued even after his bankruptcy.

== Later career ==
With the backing of friends, Thaarup continued to make hats, moving to smaller premises at 132 King's Road Chelsea. The move to one of the soon-to-be epicentres of the Swinging London scene was a step down from Mayfair, but seems to have inspired Thaarup. He ended his 1959 show by saying: "Stop, we are forgetting Young London", then bringing forward a young amateur model who had been co-opted when he spotted her passing his store and placing one of his hats on her head. The reporter noted that the young girl wore the typical Chelsea outfit of white stockings, straight hair and plain dress and both she and the audience were delighted by the transforming effect of a design created by this: "dearly loved figure in the London fashion world". In 1960, Thaarup was reported to be collaborating with hairdresser Vidal Sassoon to ensure the hats matched the new decade's hairstyles. A year later – still sponsored by friends – Thaarup moved to business premises in Hanover Square.

In 1961, Thaarup was granted a Royal Warrant. This remained in place until 1974, even though he had been less active in business since the mid-1960s, when he officially retired.

== Legacy ==
Among those who worked for Thaarup were Constance Babington Smith – a trained hatmaker although she was more interested in aviation – and the notable milliner John Boyd, who was Thaarup's apprentice. Examples of Aage Thaarup's work are held in, among others, the Victoria and Albert Museum and Museum Victoria, Melbourne. His most enduring model, the tricorn bearskin, was among the works included in the 2003 Kensington Palace exhibition Hats and Handbags – with all items in the exhibition being selected by the Queen and her assistants.

== Bibliography ==
- Thaarup, Aage and Shackell, Dora, Heads & Tails, 1956, Cassell & Company, London
- Thaarup, Aage and Shackell, Dora, How to Make a Hat, 1957, Cassell & Company, London
