= Hardy Amies =

English fashion designer

Amies in October 1961

Sir Edwin Hardy Amies KCVO (17 July 1909 – 5 March 2003) was a British fashion designer, founder of the Hardy Amies label and a Royal Warrant holder as designer to Queen Elizabeth II.

== Early life ==
Edwin Hardy Amies was born on 17 July 1909 in Maida Vale, London, to Herbert Amies and Mary, née Hardy. He had a sister, Rosemary (born 1915), and a younger brother with Down's Syndrome, Wilfred (born 1918). His father, of "lower middle class" origin, was an architect for the London County Council who served as a captain in the First World War and was subsequently appointed 'resident agent' for the Becontree public housing estate in Essex; his mother was a senior saleswoman (or "vendeuse") for dressmakers Madame Gray at Machinka & May, London, and then Madame Durant on Dover Street, London. The family subsequently moved to Alperton and later to Barking. From his teens on, he used his middle name- his mother's maiden name, Hardy- and always cited her as the inspiration for his chosen professional path. He stopped using his first name, Edwin, which he had been given in honour of his paternal grandfather, Edwin Amies, a successful businessman who owned a factory producing 'dandy rolls', from which watermarks in paper and banknotes were created; he lived beyond his means, however, with a reputation as a "man about town" in both London and Paris, meaning at his death less money was left than had been supposed. Amies described his father as "most affectionate", saying they "didn't get on badly by any means", but he got on better with his mother, "indiscreetly" opining that his father "wasn't very bright", and that his mother, a "pretty, intelligent... ambitious" "village girl" from a "less financially stable background" than her husband, had "what is laughingly called taste - of course it was restricted to suburban taste, her life being very circumscribed."

== Pre-war career ==
Amies was educated at Brentwood School, Essex, leaving in 1927. Although his father wanted him to attend Cambridge University, Amies considered himself a mediocre student; nevertheless, he was recommended for a scholarship, but failed the examination. It was at that time his ambition to become a journalist. His father relented and arranged for a meeting between his son and Ralph Blumenfeld, the editor of the Daily Express. His father was mortified when Blumenfeld suggested his son travel around Europe to gain some worldly experience.

Amies spent three years in France and Germany, learning the languages, working for a customs agent and then as an English-language tutor in Antibes in France and later Bendorf in Germany. Amies returned to England where, in 1930, he became a sales assistant in a ceramic wall-tile factory. After that, he secured a trainee position as a weight machine salesman with W & T Avery in Birmingham.

It was Amies' mother's contacts in the fashion world, and his flair for writing, that secured him his first job in fashion. It was his vivid description of a dress, written in a letter to a retired French seamstress, that brought Hardy to the attention of the owner of the Mayfair couture house Lachasse on Farm Street, Berkeley Square, as the wearer of the dress was the owner's wife. He became managing director, in 1934, at the age of 25. His most notable innovation during this epoch was to lower the waistline of women's suits. He placed it at the top of the hip instead of at the natural waistline, giving a more feminine look.

In 1937, he scored his first success with a Linton tweed suit in sage green with a cerise overcheck called "Panic". "Panic" was to be his debut into the fashion bible Vogue, photographed by Cecil Beaton. By the late 1930s, Hardy was designing the entire Lachasse collection – succeeding Digby Morton. His second celebration creation was "Made in England", a biscuit-coloured checked suit for the Hollywood ingénue Mildred Shay. He left Lachasse in 1939 and joined the House of Worth in 1941.

== Second World War ==
At the outbreak of the Second World War, with his language experience, Amies was called to serve in the Special Operations Executive (SOE). He was commissioned as a second lieutenant from Officer Cadet Training Company on to the British Army General List on 18 May 1940. He was transferred from the General List to the Intelligence Corps on 15 July 1940. Amies suspected that SOE's commander Major General Colin Gubbins did not regard a dressmaker as suitable military material; but his training report stated:

This officer is far tougher both physically and mentally than his rather precious appearance would suggest. He possesses a keen brain and an abundance of shrewd sense. His only handicap is his precious appearance and manner, and these are tending to decrease.

Posted to Belgium, Amies worked with the various Belgian resistance groups and adapted names of fashion accessories for use as code words, while he organised sabotage assignments and arranged for agents to be parachuted with radio equipment behind enemy lines, into the Ardennes. Amies rose to the rank of lieutenant colonel, but outraged his superiors in 1944 by engaging famed photographer Lee Miller and setting up a Vogue photo shoot in Belgium after D-Day. In 1946, he was knighted in Belgium, being made an Officer of the Order of the Crown on 17 September 1948 by the prince regent of Belgium.

Amies was an integral part of Operation Ratweek, an assassination project developed by SOE to eliminate double agents and Nazi sympathizers in Belgium. In 2000, a BBC Two documentary entitled Secret Agent named Amies as one of the men who helped to plan the killing of dozens of Nazi collaborators, but Amies disclaimed all knowledge of the matter.

Amies was quirky, yet conservative; for example, having his British Army uniform tailored on Savile Row. Years later, Hardy recalled that Kim Philby was in his mess; and, on being asked what the infamous spy was like, Hardy quipped, "He was always trying to get information out of me—most significantly the name of my tailor."

== Hardy Amies Ltd. ==
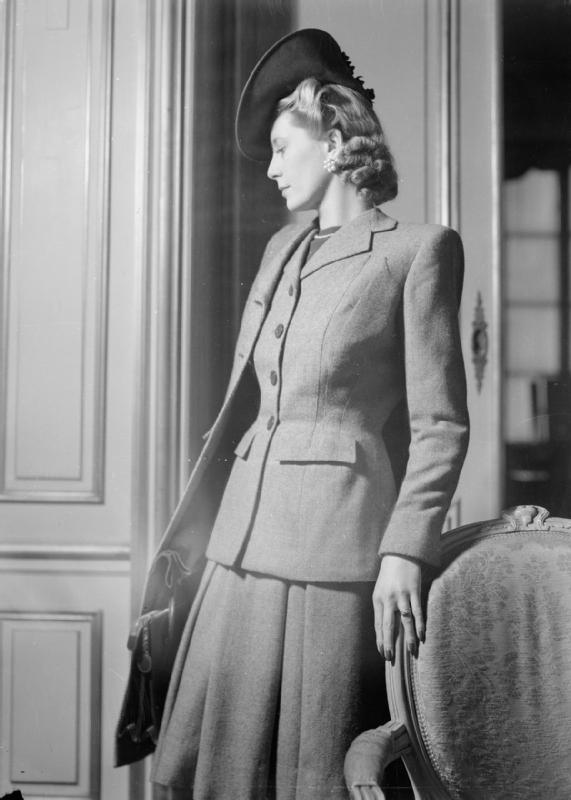
A wool outfit by Hardy Amies in 1945

In late 1945, Virginia, Countess of Jersey, who had been a client during his tenure at Lachasse, financed Amies' move to Savile Row in London. The following January, Amies established his own couture fashion house business, named Hardy Amies Ltd. Although Savile Row is the home of English bespoke tailoring, the Hardy Amies brand became known for its classic and beautifully tailored clothes for both men and women.

The business quickly took off in the postwar years when customers, who had been deprived of couture during the preceding years, snapped up his elegant, traditional designs. Amies was quoted at the time as saying, "A woman's day clothes must look equally good at Salisbury Station as the Ritz Bar". Amies was vice-chairman of the Incorporated Society of London Fashion Designers from 1954 to 1956 and then chairman from 1959 to 1960.

Starting in 1946, the fashion house was located at № 14 Savile Row. In 1950, Amies established a ready-to-wear boutique with suits, sweaters, coats and accessories.

The business changed ownership several times over the course of its history. In 2018, the company went into administration for a second time and was attempting to sell its assets in 2019. The № 14 Savile Row store was closed in March 2019, and the space was taken over in June by Hackett London as its flagship store.

The label continues doing business in Australia, run by Austico Apparel. Their products are available at Hardy & Harper, David Jones, and other private retailers across Australia.

== Commercial success ==
Amies was successful in business by being able to extract value from his designs, while not replicating his brand to the point of exploitation. In 1959, Amies was one of the first European designers to venture into the ready-to-wear market when he teamed up with Hepworth & Son to design a range of menswear. In 1961, Amies made fashion history by staging the first men's ready-to-wear catwalk shows, at the Savoy Hotel, London. The runway show was a first on many levels, as it was both the first time music was played and that the designer accompanied models on the catwalk.

=== Menswear designing ===
In 1959, Amies was one of the first women's couturiers to design for men. He used to be more conservative than other menswear designers. His designs were characterized by an emphasis on youthful and rich-looking clothing. He signed numerous licensing agreements to produce popular garments in various countries.

=== Sports ===
Amies also undertook design for in-house work wear, which developed from designing special clothes for the England 1966 World Cup team, the 1972 British Olympic squad, and such groups as the Oxford University Boat Club and the London Stock Exchange. In the mid-1970s, he ventured into interior design, including designs for Crown Wallpaper.

=== Films ===
In 1967, Amies was commissioned by director Stanley Kubrick to design the costumes for 2001: A Space Odyssey (1968). Amies' work was seen in a handful of other films of the 1960s: He dressed Albert Finney in Two for the Road (1967), Tony Randall in The Alphabet Murders (1965), Joan Greenwood in The Amorous Prawn (1962), and Deborah Kerr in The Grass is Greener (1960).

=== Queen Elizabeth II ===
Amies is best known to the British public for his work for Queen Elizabeth II. The association began in 1950, when Amies made several outfits for the then-Princess Elizabeth's royal tour of Canada. In 1955, the queen appointed him as one of her three official dressmakers. He established the monarch's crisp, understated style of dress. "I don't think she feels clothes which are too chic are exactly very friendly," he told one fashion editor. "The Queen's attitude is that she must always dress for the occasion".

Knighted in 1989, Amies held the warrant until 1990, when he gave it up so that younger designers could create for the Queen, although the House of Hardy Amies was still designing for her under Design Director Jon Moore until 2002.

== ABC of Men's Fashion ==
Having written a regular column for Esquire magazine on men's fashion, Amies published the book ABC of Men's Fashion in 1964. His strict male dress code included commandments on everything from socks to the summer wardrobe. He stated, "A man should look as if he has bought his clothes with intelligence, put them on with care and then forgotten all about them." When the Hardy Amies Designer Archive was opened in July 2009 on Savile Row, the Victoria & Albert Museum reissued the book.

In 1974, Amies was entered into Vanity Fair magazine's International Best Dressed List Hall of Fame.

== Later life ==
In May 1973, Hardy Amies Ltd. was sold to Debenhams, which had already purchased Hepworths who distributed the Hardy Amies line. In 1981, Amies purchased the business back. In May 2001, Amies sold his business to the Luxury Brands Group and retired at the end of the year, when Moroccan-born designer Jacques Azagury became head of couture.

In November 2008, after going bankrupt, the Hardy Amies brand was acquired by Fung Capital, the private investment arm of Victor and William Fung, who together control the Li & Fung Group.

== Honours ==
- He received the 1939–1945 Star, the France and Germany Star, the Defence Medal and the War Medal for service with the Special Operations Executive during World War II.
- Knight Commander of the Royal Victorian Order (KCVO) awarded 17 June 1989.
- Commander of the Royal Victorian Order (CVO) awarded 10 June 1977.
- He was made an Officer of the Order of the Crown by the Kingdom of Belgium awarded 17 September 1948.

== Personal life ==
Initially discreet about his homosexuality, Amies became more candid in his old age and, when speaking of Sir Norman Hartnell, another renowned dressmaker to the Queen, he commented: "It's quite simple. He was a silly old queen and I'm a clever old queen."

Amies and his partner, Ken Fleetwood, Design Director of Hardy Amies Ltd, were together for 43 years until Fleetwood's death in 1996. Amies died at home in 2003, aged 93. He is buried in the village churchyard at Langford, Oxfordshire.
