= Lavalier microphone =

Microphone that attaches to clothing

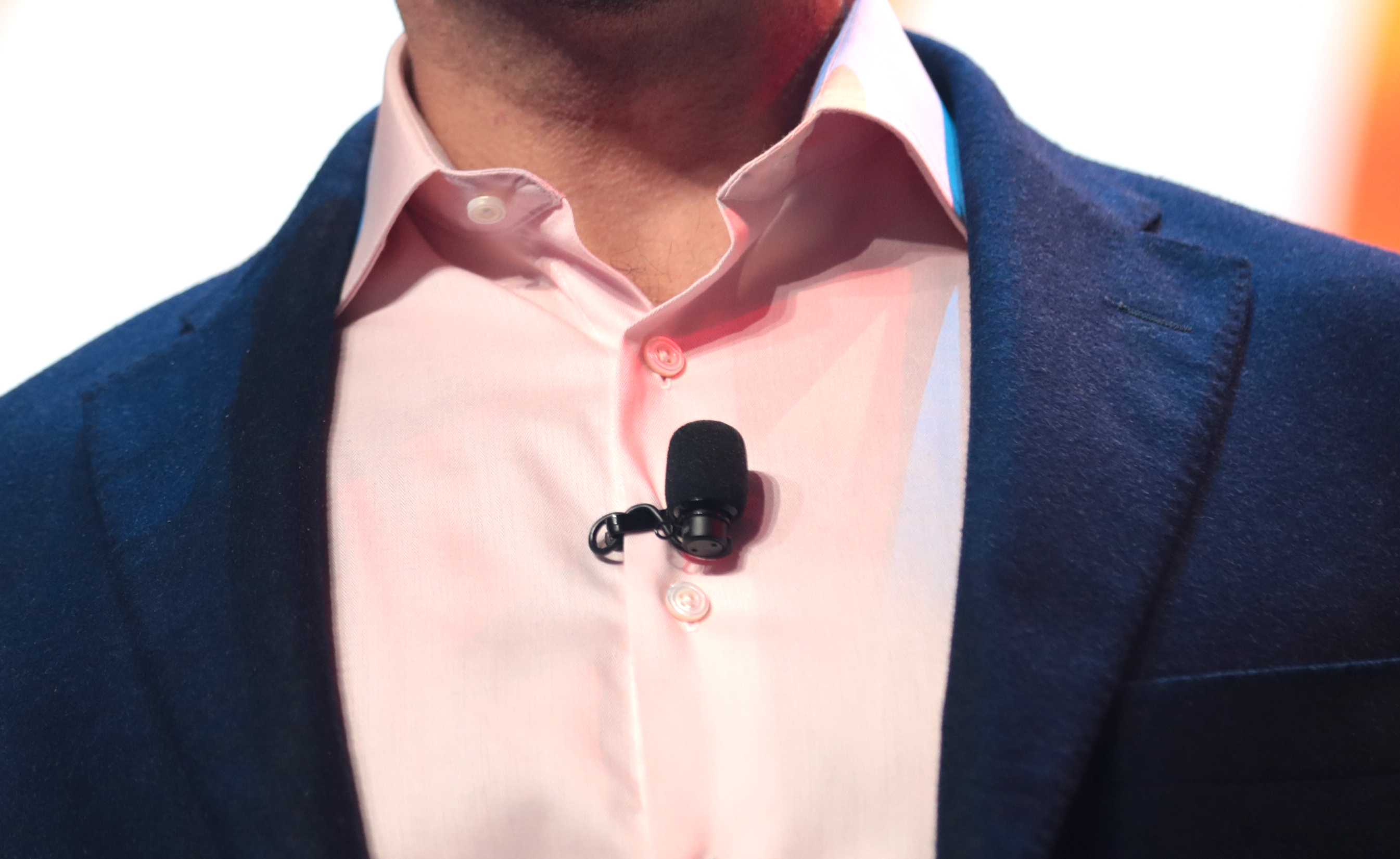
A lavalier microphone clipped to a shirt

A lavalier microphone or lavalier (also known as a lav, lapel mic, clip mic, body mic, collar mic, neck mic or personal mic) is a small microphone used for television, interview and other studio applications to allow hands-free operation. They are most commonly provided with small clips for attaching to collars, ties, or other clothing. The cord may be hidden by clothes and either run to a radio frequency transmitter kept in a pocket or clipped to a belt, or routed directly to the mixer or a recording device.

These miniature microphones are often supplied with a choice of push-on grills of differing lengths that provide gentle high-frequency boost by forming a resonant cavity. A presence peak like this is beneficial for compensating loss of clarity when chest-mounted, or when mounted in the hair above the forehead. This method of boosting high frequencies does not worsen noise-performance, as electronic equalization would do.

== History ==
Lapel microphones date from 1932. Various models were made, including ones with condenser diaphragms, ribbons, moving coils, and carbon buttons. The term referred to any small microphone that could be hooked into the buttonhole of the lapel of a coat. The lapel microphone offered freedom of movement.

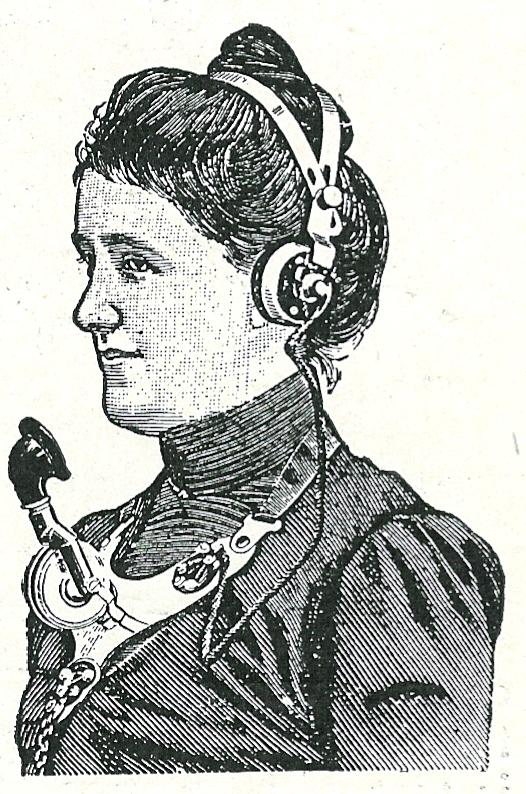
An early use of the microphone supported by a strap around the neck: telephone operator

The term lavalier originally referred to jewelry in the form of a pendant worn around the neck. Its use as the name of a type of microphone originates from the 1930s, when various practical solutions to microphone use involved hanging the microphone from the neck. For instance, a Dictaphone microphone could be suspended on a cord around the neck in order to retain some degree of freedom of movement while recording one's voice onto a wax cylinder in 1941. Telephone operators and air traffic controllers used microphones that rested on the chest and were secured by a strap around the neck. In the 1950s, some microphone models were designed to be hung on a string around the neck. In 1953, Electro-Voice introduced the Model 647A, a small omnidirectional dynamic microphone fitted with a cord to go around the neck. The body of the 647A was lightweight at 2 ounces (57 g) and relatively small at 0.75 inches (19 mm) in diameter and 3.63 inches (92 mm) in length. In 1954, Shure Brothers offered the larger 530 Slendyne, which could be handheld, mounted on a microphone stand, or worn around the neck on a "lavalier cord."

== Mounting techniques ==
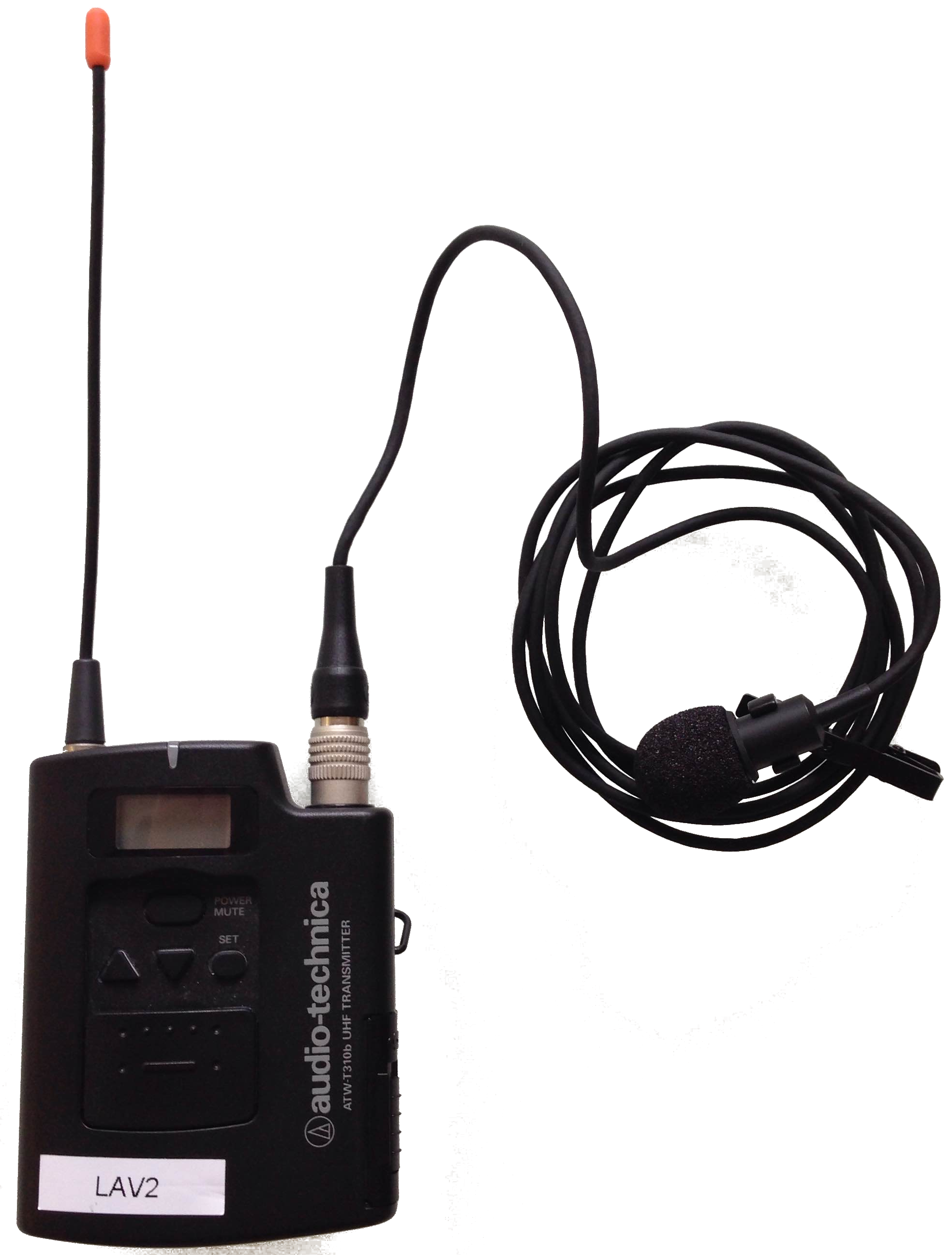
Lavalier microphone and transmitter pack

Lavalier microphones are attached differently depending on the nature of their use. In theater applications where the microphone is used to amplify an actor or a singer's voice, lavaliers are typically concealed in the performer's hair. This placement eliminates the possibility of scratching against their clothing while they move, which would result in the amplification of the scratching sounds as well. It also adds to the suspension of disbelief, since the characters themselves would not be wearing microphones, especially if the plot is set in a time before lavalier microphones existed. Occasionally, specially designed skin-color headsets known as "headworn microphones" are used in stage applications when actors spend a good deal of their performance singing and moving around quickly, such as in stage musicals and in lecture or presentation scenarios. A headworn microphone is essentially a lavalier on a stiff wire mount that loops over the performer's ear.

In television and documentary applications, the lavalier will typically be clipped to an article of the subject's clothing, such as a tie, jacket or collar. In narrative motion picture usage, lavaliers are almost always hidden under clothing. The boom microphone typically sounds "better" and more natural than a lavalier mic and is always a soundperson's first choice; however, for exterior location shooting, it often may be more practical to use a lavalier. One such situation would be during a wide shot that forces the boom operator to keep a distance from the speaker that is not close enough to achieve a good signal-to-noise ratio with the microphone. In that instance, a lavalier microphone hidden on the speaker would achieve better signal-to-noise ratio for recording speech because of its proximity. When lavalier microphones are concealed under clothing, the clothing often scratches against the microphone. To minimize this problem, sound recordists sometimes wrap the head of the microphones in moleskin or place it inside a hollow-centered, column-shaped sponge and place it under a placard, behind a button, or within the knot of a tie.

The transmitter pack to which the microphone is attached may also need to be hidden under a person's clothing. Transmitter pouches are held on with elastic straps and serve to keep the transmitter hidden in various places where clothing provides a non-revealing space, such as high around the waist in the space created at the spine just above the belt line, inside the thigh under a skirt or dress, about the ankles under a trouser leg, or even on the inside of a boot.

== See also ==
- Louise de La Vallière
- Ève Lavallière
- lavallière
- Lavalier
