= Lavalier =

Form of jewelry

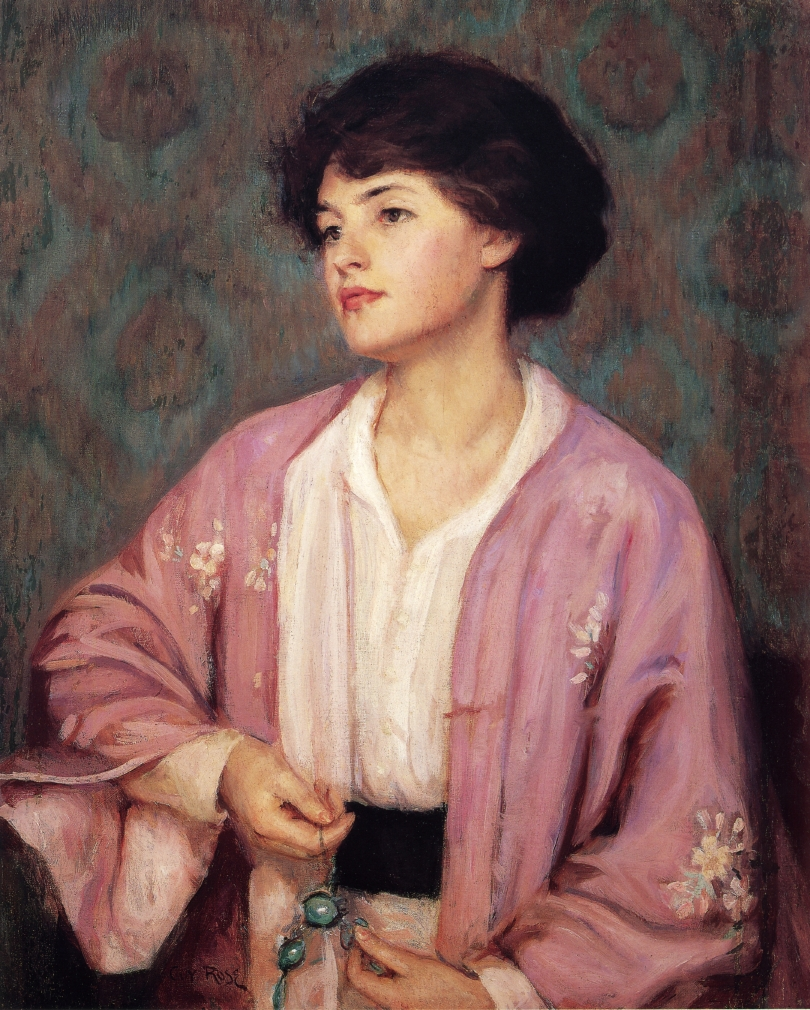
The Lavalier by Guy Rose

A lavalier or lavaliere or lavalliere is an item of jewelry consisting of a pendant, sometimes with one stone, pendulous and centered from a necklace.

The style was popularized by Louise de la Vallière, a mistress of King Louis XIV of France. A lavalier can be recognized most for its drop, usually consisting of a stone and/or a chandelier pendant, which is attached directly to the chain, not by a bail.

According to Hans Nadelhoffer, Cartier: Jewelers Extraordinary (1984), p. 50:

A special form of necklace produced around 1900 was the lavallière, an imaginative allusion to a fashion named for the actress Ève Lavallière, suspending two overlapping pendants, generally of different lengths. The necklace itself often consisted of a simple silk cord with diamond sliding motifs, in which the imaginative end motifs were often intertwined. Princess George of Greece (Marie Bonaparte) received a lavallière with two diamond fir cones, the Tsarina of Russia one with amethyst acorns. Eve Lavallière made her debut in 1891 at the Théâtre des Variétés, having previously worked in a hat factory, tying ribbons. The cravats which were produced in this way were called lavallières and provided a stage-name for the actress, whose real name was Eve Ferroglio. She died in a convent in 1929.

"Lavallière" is still the French name for a pussy bow.

Later, the American collegiate fraternity system ("greeks") adopted a lavalier which contained the fraternity letters as part of or within the pendant to symbolize involvement in an ongoing romantic relationship. Women receiving these pendants were called "dropped," but may later enter a long-term relationship resulting in becoming "pinned" (woman receiving the man's fraternity pin to wear), engaged and married.

== See also ==
- College and university dating
- Louise de La Vallière
- Ève Lavallière
- lavallière
- Lavalier microphone
