= Ève Lavallière =

French actress and Catholic penitent (1866–1929)

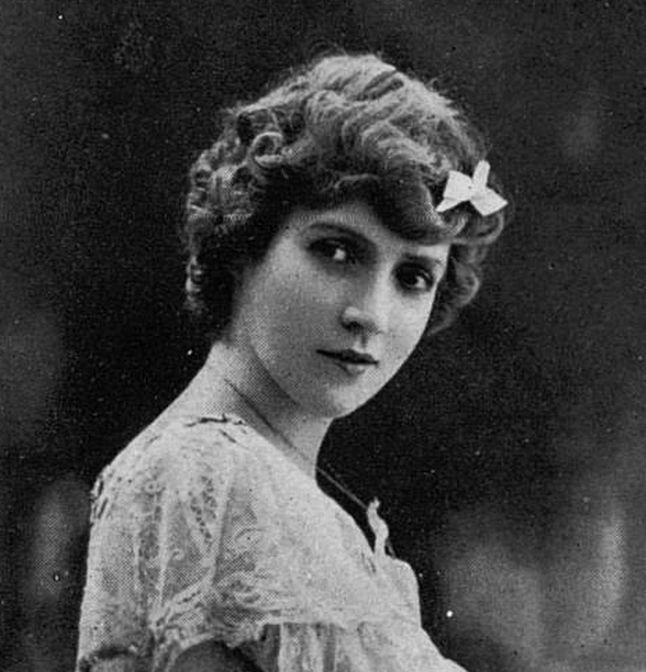
- Lavallière, c. 1890
- Born: Eugénie Marie Pascaline Fenoglio; 1 April 1866; Toulon, Second French Empire
- Died: 10 July 1929 (aged 63); Thuillières, French Third Republic
- Occupation: Actress

Ève Lavallière (French pronunciation: [ɛv lavaljɛʁ]; born Eugénie Marie Pascaline Fenoglio, 1 April 1866 – 10 July 1929) was a French stage actress and later a noteworthy Catholic penitent and member of the Secular Franciscan Order.

== Biography ==
Ève Lavallière was born at 8 rue Champ-de-Mars in Toulon. She was the daughter of Louis-Emile Fenoglio, a tailor of Neapolitan origin, and Albania-Marie Rana, who was born in Perpignan. At birth, her parents already had a son. Her birth was not desired, and she was placed, up to school age, with a local family of peasants. At school age, however, she was enrolled by her parents in a private school of excellent reputation. After the death of her parents in tragic circumstances and running away from home she arrived in Paris as a teenager. She became an actress renowned in the Belle Époque, including the Théâtre des Variétés in Paris.

From 1917, she moved to the castle of Choisille, at Chanceaux-sur-Choisille, Indre-et-Loire (later occupied by the Pinder circus). She had a radical religious conversion and became a devout Catholic. She wished to join a religious order and for a time was a medical missionary in Tunisia. She became a Franciscan tertiary, a member of the Secular Franciscan Order or Third Order of St Francis.

She is buried in Thuillières where she died in 1929.

== Theater ==
Her most famous roles were in the following:

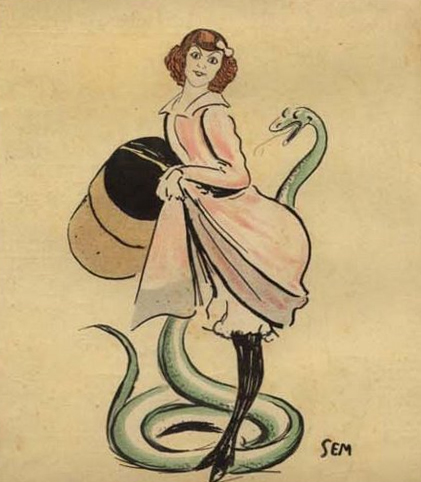
Caricature by Georges Goursat Sem (1902).

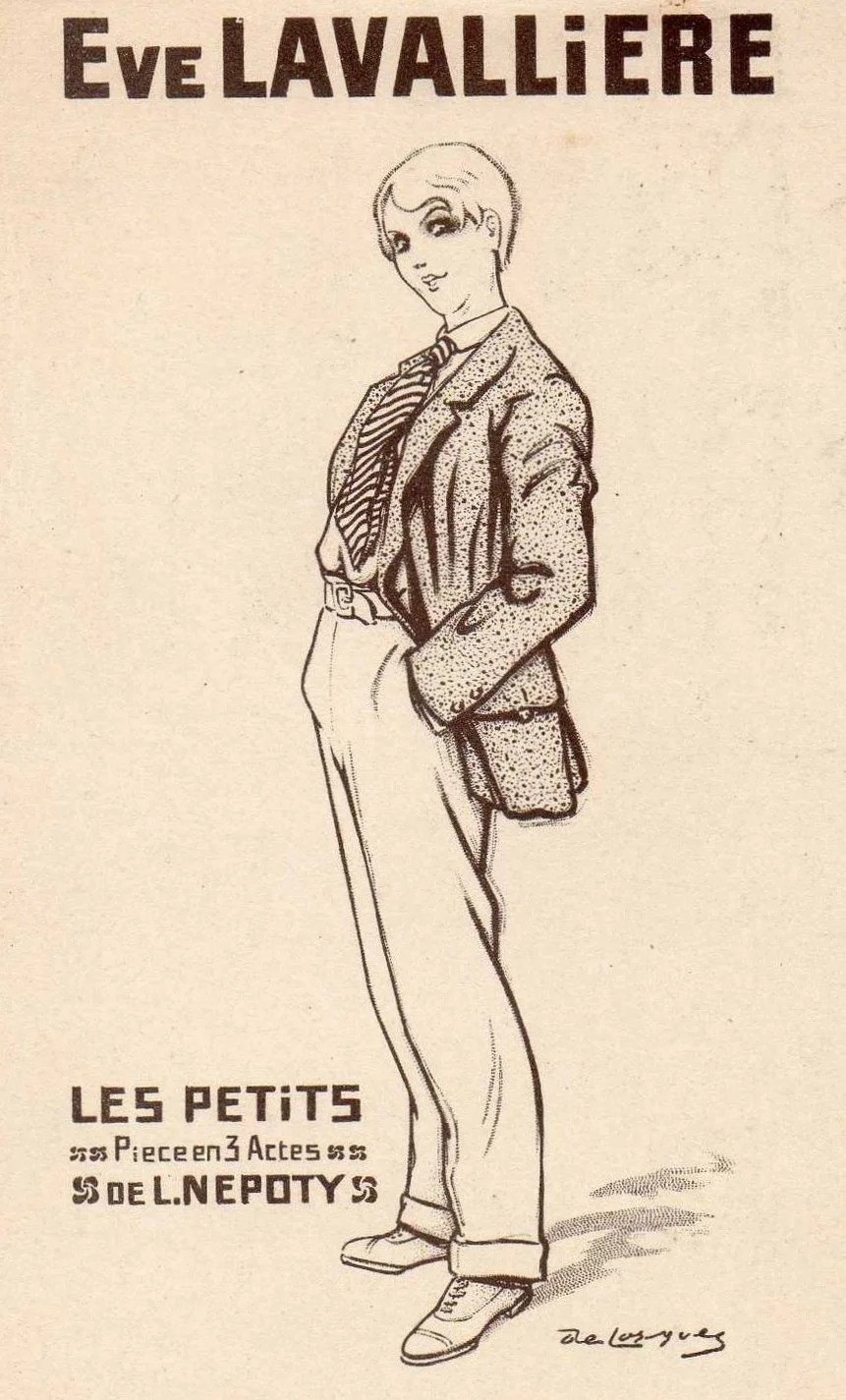
45 year old Lavallière as a schoolboy in her garçonne haircut, drawing by Daniel de Losques (1912)

- 1892 : La Vie parisienne by Jacques Offenbach, Henri Meilhac, Ludovic Halévy, Théâtre des Variétés,
- 1896 : Le Carillon by Ernest Blum and Paul Ferrier, Théâtre des Variétés
- 1897 : Paris qui Marche, a review by Hector Monréal and Henri Blondeau, Théâtre des Variétés
- 1898 : Les Petites Barnett by Paul Gavault and Louis Varney, Théâtre des Variétés
- 1899 : La Belle Hélène by Jacques Offenbach, booklet by Henri Meilhac and Ludovic Halévy, Théâtre des Variétés
- 1900 : Mademoiselle George by Victor de Cottens and Pierre Veber, music by Louis Vernet, Théâtre des Variétés
- 1901 : La Veine by Alfred Capus, Théâtre des Variétés
- 1902 : Les Deux Écoles by Alfred Capus, Théâtre des Variétés
- 1903 : Le Sire de Vergy by Gaston Arman de Caillavet, Théâtre des Variétés
- 1903 : Paris aux Variétés, revue by Paul Gavault, Théâtre des Variétés
- 1904 : La Boule by Henri Meilhac and Ludovic Halévy, Théâtre des Variétés
- 1904 : Monsieur de la Palisse by Robert de Flers and Gaston Arman de Caillavet, music by Claude Terrasse, Théâtre des Variétés
- 1904 : Die Fledermaus as La Chauve-Souris (Prince Orlofsky), words by Henri Meilhac and Ludovic Halevy, music by Johann Strauss
- 1904 : Barbe-bleue by Jacques Offenbach, libretto by Henri Meilhac and Ludovic Halévy, Théâtre des Variétés
- 1905 : L'Âge d'Or by Georges Feydeau and Maurice Desvallières, Théâtre des Variétés
- 1905 : Miss Helyett, an opérette in 3 acts, text by Maxime Boucheron, music by Edmond Audran, Théâtre des Variétés
- 1905 : La Petite Bohême, an opera in 3 acts, text by Paul Ferrier after Henry Murger, music by Henri Hirchmann, Théâtre des Variétés
- 1906 : Miquette et sa mère by Robert de Flers and Gaston Arman de Caillavet, Théâtre des Variétés
- 1907 : Le Faux-pas by André Picard, Théâtre des Variétés
- 1908 : Le Roi by Robert de Flers, Gaston Arman de Caillavet, Emmanuel Arène, Théâtre des Variétés
- 1908 : L'Oiseau blessé by Alfred Capus, Théâtre de la Renaissance
- 1909 : Un ange by Alfred Capus, Théâtre des Variétés
- 1910 : Le Bois sacré by Robert de Flers and Gaston Arman de Caillavet, Théâtre des Variétés
- 1911 : Les Favorites by Alfred Capus, Théâtre des Variétés
- 1912 : Les Petits by Lucien Népoty, Théâtre Antoine
- 1913 : La Dame de chez Maxim by Georges Feydeau, Théâtre des Variétés
- 1913 : Le Tango, a work of Jean Richepin, Théâtre de l'Athénée
- 1914 : Ma tante d'Honfleur by Paul Gavault, Théâtre des Variétés

== See also ==
- Louise de La Vallière
- lavallière
- Lavalier
- Lavalier microphone
