= DateMySchool =

DateMySchool was an online dating platform targeted toward university students and alumni. It required a university email address, and claimed that it permits only verified students and alumni to join. It allowed users to filter by schools, departments, individuals and other groups from accessing their profiles, which were all subject to the same security policy based on university email addresses. The site did not index profiles on Google.

Official logo

Site registration was free, but members were prompted to sign up for a subscription if they visited their inbox.

== History ==
DateMySchool was co-founded by Columbia University M.B.A. students Balazs Alexa and Jean Meyer on November 8, 2010, after a woman in the School of Social Work complained that there were too few men in her department. DateMySchool first expanded to New York University; University of California, Berkeley; Stanford, Harvard, and Massachusetts Institute of Technology; and then spread to 350 schools before launching to more than 1,000 schools nationwide.

=== Privacy ===
DateMySchool members could exclude schools, departments, and individuals. By default, members would not be seen by their classmates as they were invisible to their department and their department was invisible to them. However, they could change their privacy settings to allow members from their department to see them. Alexa and Meyer claimed that by enabling users to choose who can and cannot view their profiles the site attempted to minimize the stigma of online dating.

=== Acquisition tactics ===
DateMySchool had a campus ambassador program for which they hired students across the United States to promote the website on campus. Students were paid based on the number of signups generated from their respective campuses. DateMySchool also had an anonymous invite module that allowed a user to invite their friends and classmates. Users had the option to input an individual email address or invite their whole contact list.

While users were permitted to send invitations to any email address, the recipient of the invitation had to complete the verification process to confirm they were a student or alumni; otherwise, the recipient was unable to sign up.

=== Current status ===
As of August 2026, DateMySchool is defunct. Its website address is now links to a Vietnamese-language sports website.
