= Louise de La Vallière =

Mistress of Louis XIV (1644–1710)

Louise de La Vallière 1st Duchess of La Vallière Duchess of Vaujours
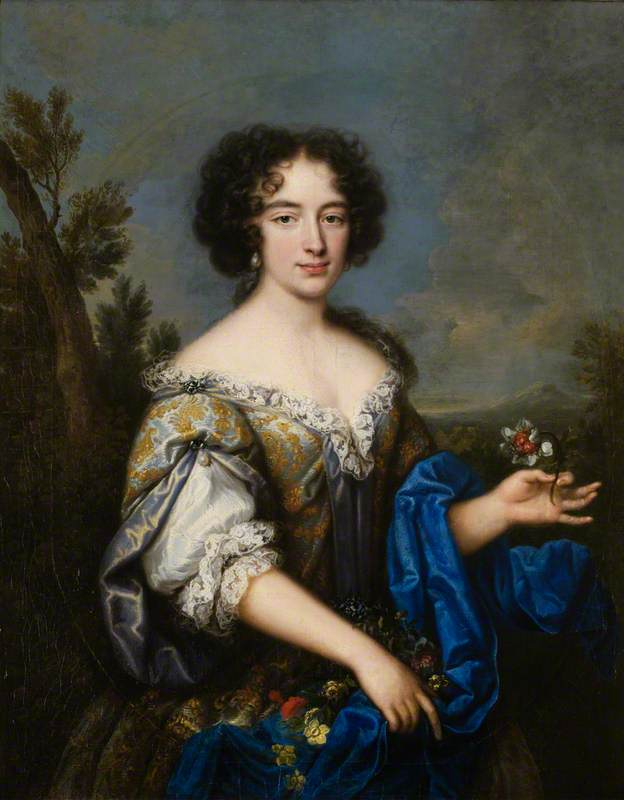
- Born: Françoise Louise de La Blaume Le Blanc; 6 August 1644; Tours, Kingdom of France
- Died: 6 June 1710 (aged 65); Paris, Kingdom of France
- Burial place: Cemetery of the Carmelite convent in Notre-Dame-des-Champs, Paris
- Other name: Sœur Louise de la Miséricorde
- Known for: Mistress of Louis XIV
- Title: Duchess of La Vallière, Duchess of Vaujours
- Successor: Marie Anne de Bourbon
- Children: 4, including Marie Anne de Bourbon and Louis, Count of Vermandois

Françoise Louise de La Baume Le Blanc, Duchess of La Vallière and Vaujours (6 August 1644 – 6 June 1710) was a French noblewoman and the mistress of Louis XIV from 1661 to 1667.

La Vallière joined the royal court in 1661 as maid-of-honour to Henrietta of England. She soon became Louis XIV's mistress. Two of her four children by the King, Marie-Anne, Mademoiselle de Blois (princess of Conti by marriage) and Louis, Count of Vermandois survived infancy and were legitimised. She was an important participant in the court's intellectual life, interested in the arts, literature, and philosophy.

In 1666, she was replaced as mistress by Madame de Montespan; she was created a suo jure duchess and invested with lands. After an illness in 1670, La Vallière turned to religion and wrote a popular devotional book. In 1674, she entered a Carmelite convent in Paris where she died in 1710.

== Family and early life ==
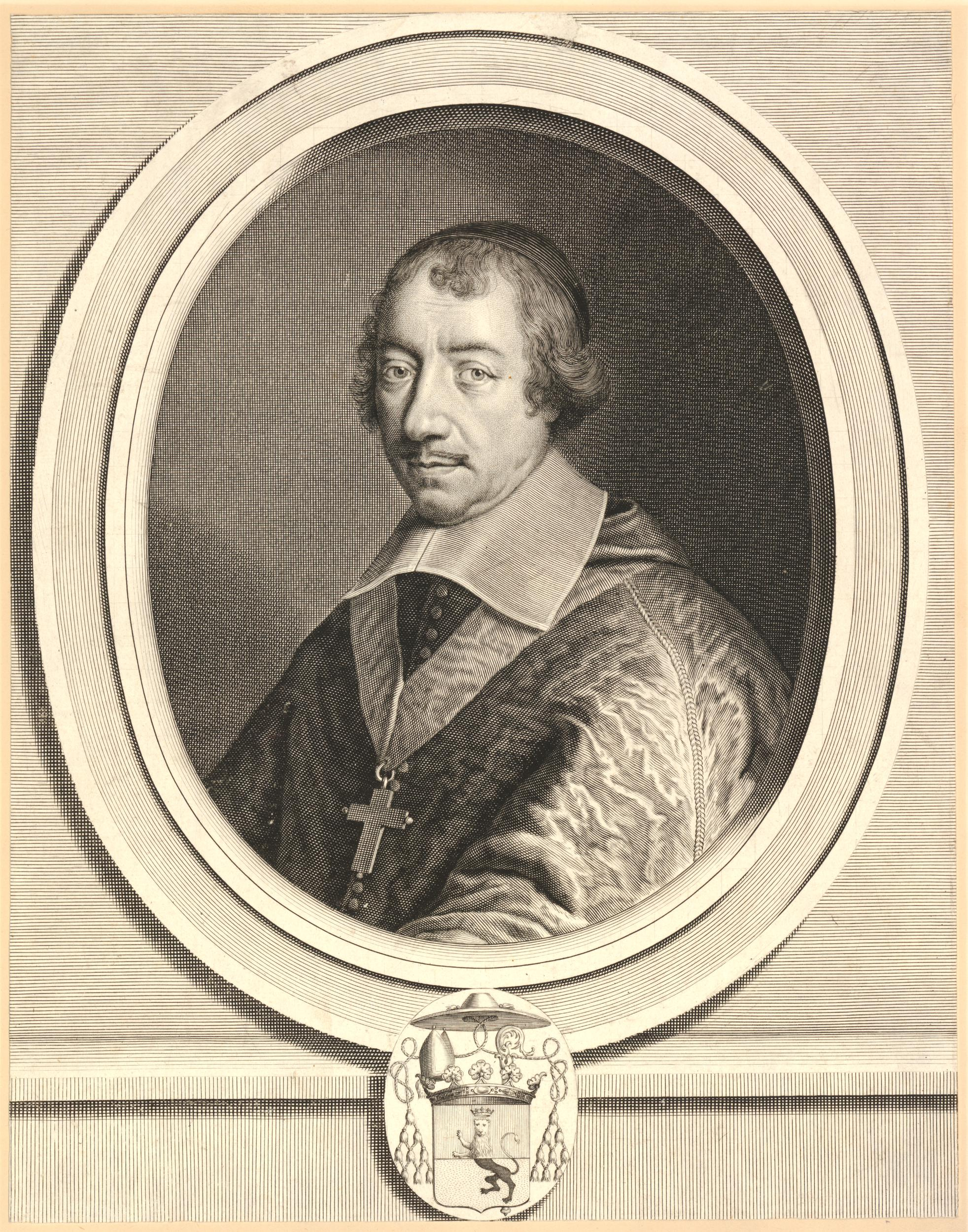
Gilles de La Baume Le Blanc de La Vallière

In La Vallière's paternal family, Catholicism and royalism were important values: many relatives chose an ecclesiastical or military career. Her maternal family were noblesse de robe. Her father served as governor of the Castle of Amboise where she occasionally visited him. He was a devout Catholic who regularly practiced penance and charity and owned a library of forty-four folios (extensive for the time). In March 1651, during the Fronde, he held Amboise against the forces of the revolt and remained loyal to Louis XIV. Françoise-Louise de La Baume Le Blanc, Mademoiselle de La Vallière was born on 6 August 1644 at the Hôtel de la Crouzille (also known as Hôtel de la Vallière) in Tours. She was the daughter of Laurent de La Baume Le Blanc, Seigneur of La Vallière, and his wife, Marie-Françoise Le Provost de La Coutelaye. She had an older brother, Jean-François, later marquis of La Vallière.

La Vallière and her brother were raised at the family seat, the Castle of La Vallière. Their uncle, Gilles de La Vallière (born 1616) was responsible for their education. La Vallière was instructed by the Ursuline nuns in Tours (whose convent included two of her paternal aunts) in reading, grammar, musical composition, and public speaking. The family owned horses and she may have gained her love of equitation then. Her limping in later life may have been caused by a horse riding accident from this time.

Laurent de La Baume Le Blanc died in the summer of 1651, leaving his family in debt. His widow claimed her dowry and dower to finance a new marriage, relinquishing guardianship of her children and depriving them of their maternal inheritance. La Vallière's paternal family persuaded Françoise Le Provost to settle the family debts and accept the furnishings of the family home in place of her dower. She rented the furniture back to her children at interest. What happened to La Vallière at this time is unknown, but she may have been sent to her aunts’ convent.

In March 1655, Françoise Le Provost married Jacques de Courtavel, Marquis of Saint-Rémy, maître d’hôtel of the exiled Gaston, Duke of Orléans (uncle of Louis XIV). Saint-Rémy had a daughter of La Vallière's age, Catherine, and the couple had a third daughter together. The family moved to the Duke's household in Blois, where La Vallière and her stepsister became demoiselles de compagnie to the Duke's younger daughters. They occasionally saw the also-exiled Grande Mademoiselle, paternal half-sister of the princesses. La Vallière befriended Anne-Constance de Montalais, another demoiselle de compagnie, who remained her confidante for years.

The three daughters of Gaston, Duke of Orléans from his second marriage

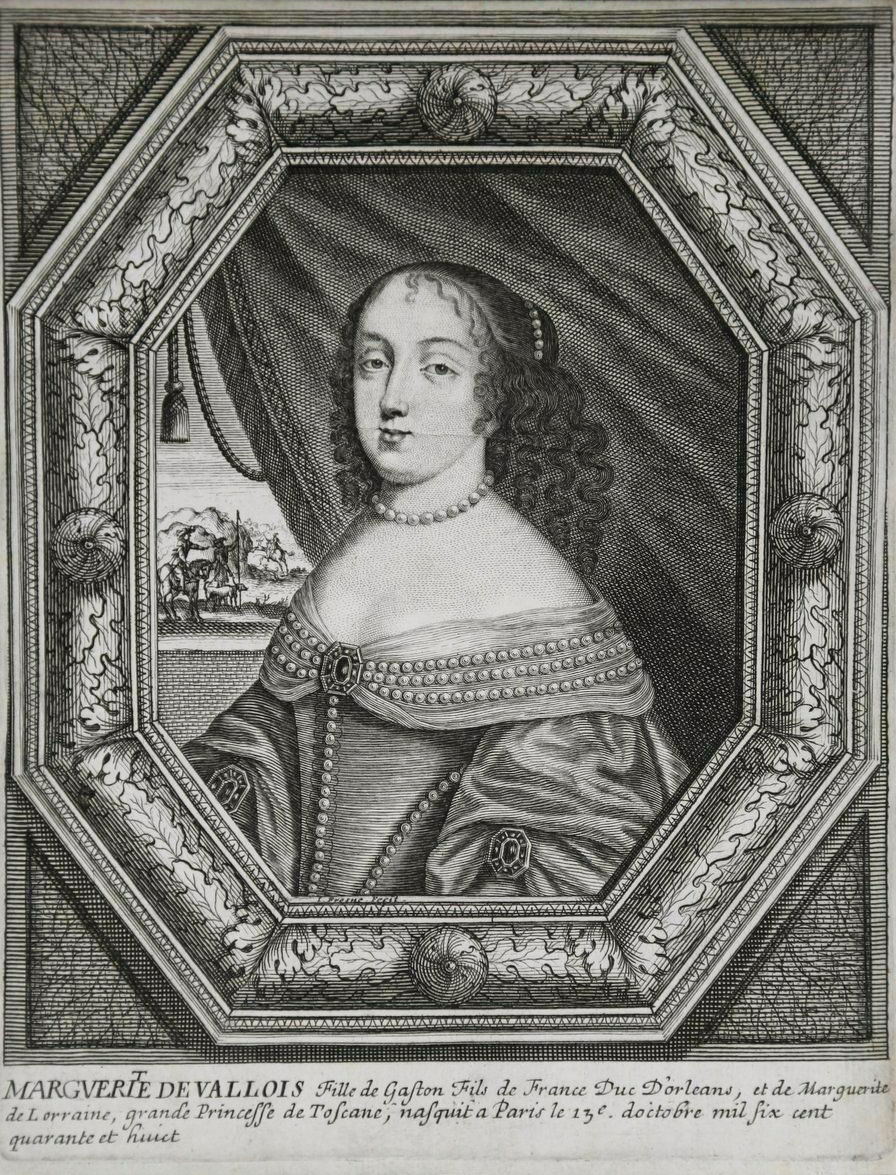
Engraved portrait of Marguerite-Louise, Mademoiselle d’Orléans by Jean Frosne from the 1660s.

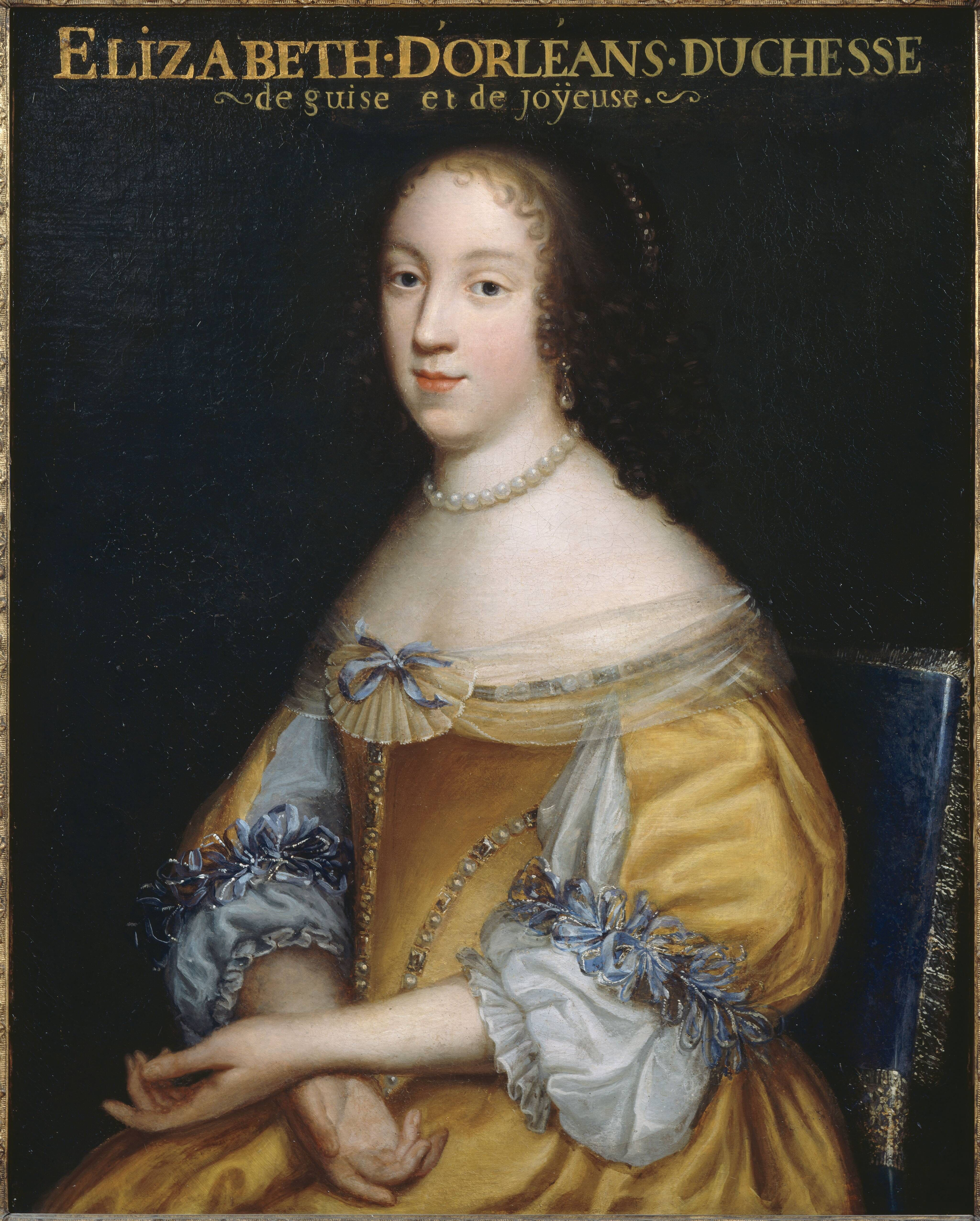
Élisabeth-Marguerite (or Isabelle), Mademoiselle d’Alençon around 1670 on a portrait by Henri and Charles Beaubrun.

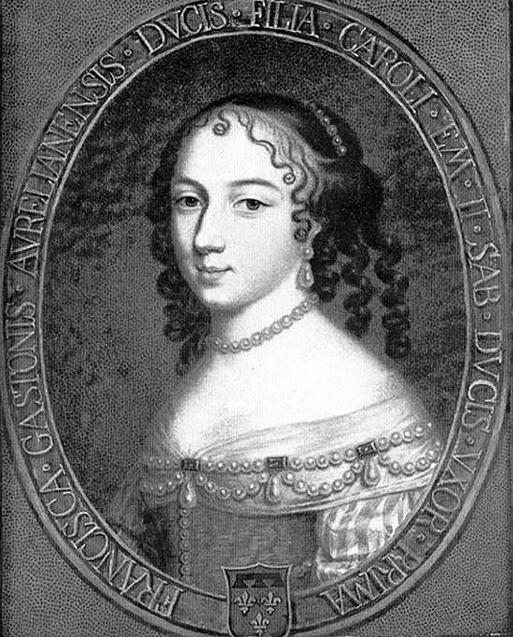
Miniature portrait of Françoise-Madeleine, Mademoiselle de Valois by Giuseppe Lavy, from between 1758 and 1766.

Lair says the education of girls in the Orléans court was neglected, while Conley claims that they were taught painting, music, etiquette, and equitation, as well as literature and philosophy by the Duke's almoner, Armand-Jean le Bouthillier de Rancé. La Vallière may have been introduced to neo-Aristotelian thought by Rancé. Huertas argues that La Vallière had to have received a good education based on her exceptional spelling. Petitfils sees her education as more rudimentary, being only in "reading, prayer, [...] sewing, and embroidery", but agrees that she was well-trained in the necessary skills for a career at court (such as dancing and horse riding). Louis XIV was an important topic of conversation due to plans that the eldest Orléans princess would marry him. In August 1659, the King visited Blois; this was the first time La Vallière saw him. Around the same time, Jacques de Bragenlonge, son of the Duke's intendant, fell in love with her. Their letters were discovered by her mother, who forbade her from writing to him. She had a "good reputation"; the Duke once said that La Vallière certainly did not take part in mischief, as she was "too sensible". Later in life, she attributed the "beginning of [her] fall" to the self-assurance she gained from his praise.

In February 1660, the Duke died and his widow, Marguerite of Lorraine, moved the household to the Luxembourg Palace in Paris. The Orléans daughters and their friends spent their time with balls and feasts organised by the Grande Mademoiselle. In August 1660, La Vallière was present at the joyeuse entrée of Louis and his new wife, Maria Theresa of Spain, into Paris.

== Secret lover of Louis XIV ==
=== Background ===
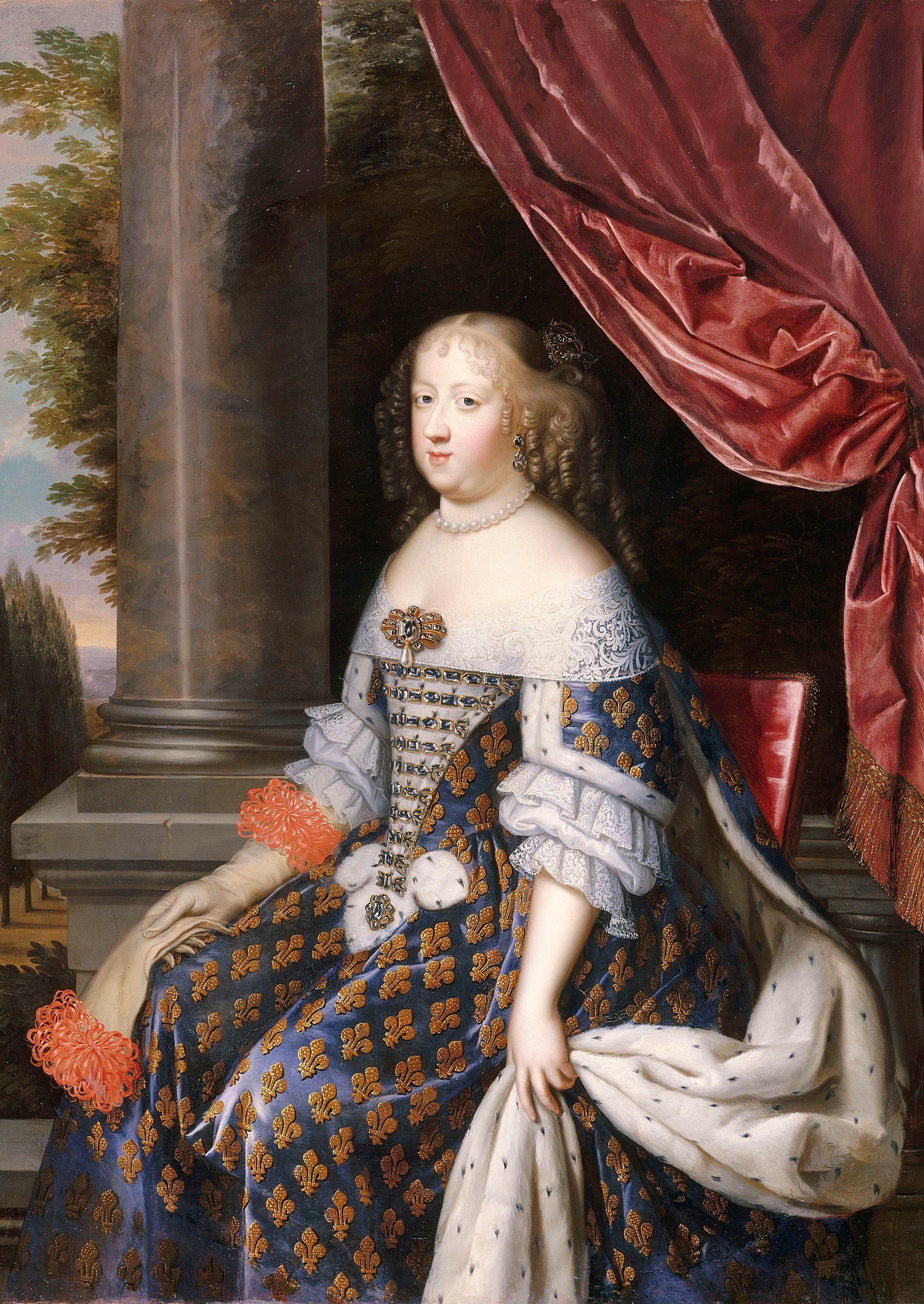
Queen Maria Theresa in her regalia, on a painting by Jean Nocret from around 1660.

In April 1661, the King's younger brother, Philippe, the new duke of Orléans ("Monsieur"), married Henrietta of England ("Madame"). Madame's household was organised by Madame de Choisy, Jeanne de Bélesbat de Hurault, a distant relative of La Vallière and member of the former Orléans household, who appointed her and her friend Montalais filles d’honneur. La Vallière and her brother (who was embarking on a military career) had no money to finance their transitions, but nobody was willing to lend to minors. They petitioned a judge who instructed their mother and stepfather to borrow money for them. La Vallière joined the Orléans household in the Tuileries Palace after the wedding. On 19 April, they moved to the court in Fontainebleau. The King's attendants courted the maids-of-honour of Madame; La Vallière's suitor was Armand de Gramont, Count of Guiche. The King and Madame grew close. Louis' wife Maria Theresa, his mother, Anne of Austria, and Monsieur all disapproved. Rumours spread that the King and his sister-in-law were in love. The King may have been advised to pretend to be in love with others, or they may have decided to do so together with Madame. Huertas and Petitfils suggest that the ploy was Henrietta's idea to deceive the Queen Mother. Olympia Mancini, Countess of Soissons, assisted them. Henrietta may have chosen the decoys herself, including La Vallière and Bonne de Pons d’Heudicourt.

The King fell in love with La Vallière. She reciprocated his feelings and probably believed them to have been sincere from the beginning. They exchanged letters through Jacques-Louis de Beringhen, the King's premier écuyer ("first squire)". Their sexual relationship started around the end of July 1661, after about six weeks of courtship. The Queen Mother noticed that her son neglected religious practice and around mid-July discovered the identity of La Vallière. She reminded Louis of his duty to his country and God, asking him to hide his feelings for La Vallière from his wife. Louis did not end his relationship but promised to conduct it secretly.

La Vallière was characterised as "innocent", "submissive", "natural[ly] modest", "sincere", and even "naïve", different from the dominant and worldly women surrounding Louis, but fitting contemporary ideals of femininity. She was not flirtatious and did not act on self-interest, exhibiting an "absolute loyalty" to the King. She was described as tall, slim, and graceful despite her limp, with blue eyes, fine, silver-blond hair, and a "beautiful" voice. Fraser suggests that La Vallière refrained from pursuing material benefits through her relationship because she needed to conceptualise it as "pure" or "holy" to fit it into her religious worldview. In his memoirs, Louis-Henri de Loménie de Brienne claims to have been in love with La Vallière, not knowing about her affair. The King saw them together when he was painting La Vallière. Brienne complimented her appearance to him, which embarrassed her. Later, discovering Louis and La Vallière together, he understood the situation. Louis then questioned him about his feelings and asked for his painting of La Vallière; Brienne promised never to talk to her again. However, by the time this story supposedly happened, Brienne had probably already heard about the King's affair from the Queen Mother.

=== First years of the relationship ===
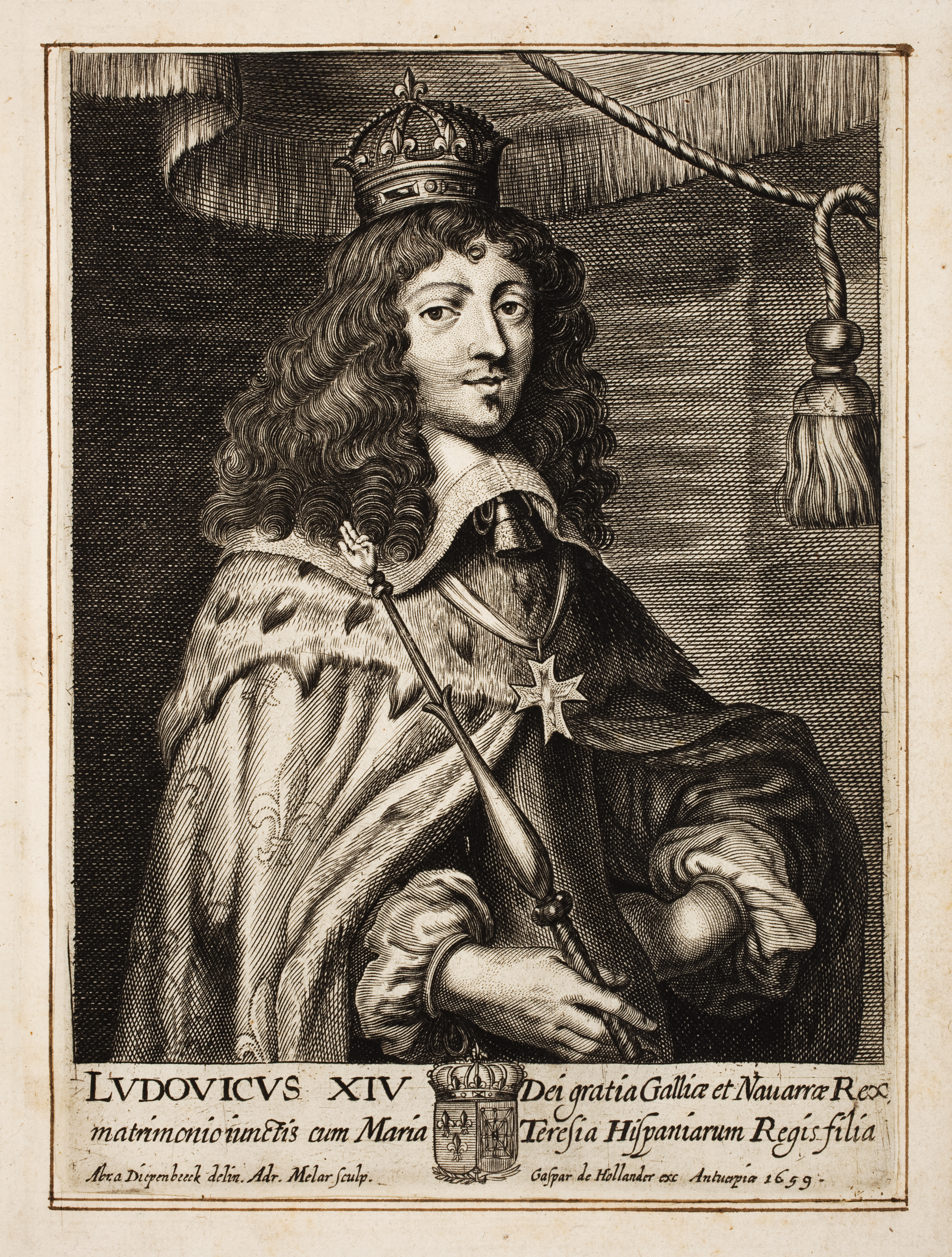
Engraved portrait of Louis XIV by Abraham van Diepenbeeck and Adriaen Millaert from 1660, commemorating his wedding with Maria Theresa of Spain.

Nicolas Fouquet, superintendent of finances noticed that the King was neglecting his religious and administrative duties. He learned of La Vallière's identity by 27 June through his network of spies. He wanted to establish a political relationship with the new favourite and sent her a letter complimenting her appearance and offering a bribe, which she refused. He then attempted to talk to her. La Vallière informed the King, who seems to have believed that Fouquet tried to seduce her. This probably added to his resentment against Fouquet, whose vast fortune, probably embezzled, he envied. In September, Fouquet was arrested and imprisoned until his death in 1680.

La Vallière became isolated because of her relationship, as Madame resented her for it. The devotion of the King to La Vallière was strengthened in October 1661, when he had a conflict with his wife who supported her father, Philip IV of Spain, in a diplomatic incident. If the Orléans household was established separately from the court, the King regularly dined there, probably to see La Vallière. La Vallière grew closer with Montalais. According to Madame de La Fayette, the King disapproved of this because he considered Montalais a "schemer". Louis seems to have been jealous of any close relationship La Vallière had. He disliked her mother and rarely permitted them to see each other.

During Lent 1662, a guest preacher, Jacques-Bénigne Bossuet delivered a series of sermons criticising the King's behaviour through biblical examples. In late February, Louis questioned La Vallière about an alleged affair between Madame and the Count of Guiche, but she refused to answer. After their argument, troubled by Bossuet's sermons, she fled the Tuileries for the Augustinian Convent of Sainte-Pélerine in Chaillot. The King was informed during an audience with Spanish envoys, rushed the talks, and searched for her personally amid fears that his wife would learn of the affair because of La Vallière's disappearance. La Fayette claims that Madame and Monsieur were reluctant to admit La Vallière back into their household, but she was eventually permitted to stay. The King's affair became public when he did not take communion on Easter. His failure to participate in the Eucharist had already been noted, but when he did not receive the sacrament on Easter (which all Catholics were commanded to do), it caused a "scandal". Since people who were "living in sin" could not receive the Eucharist, Louis' sexual affair was confirmed.

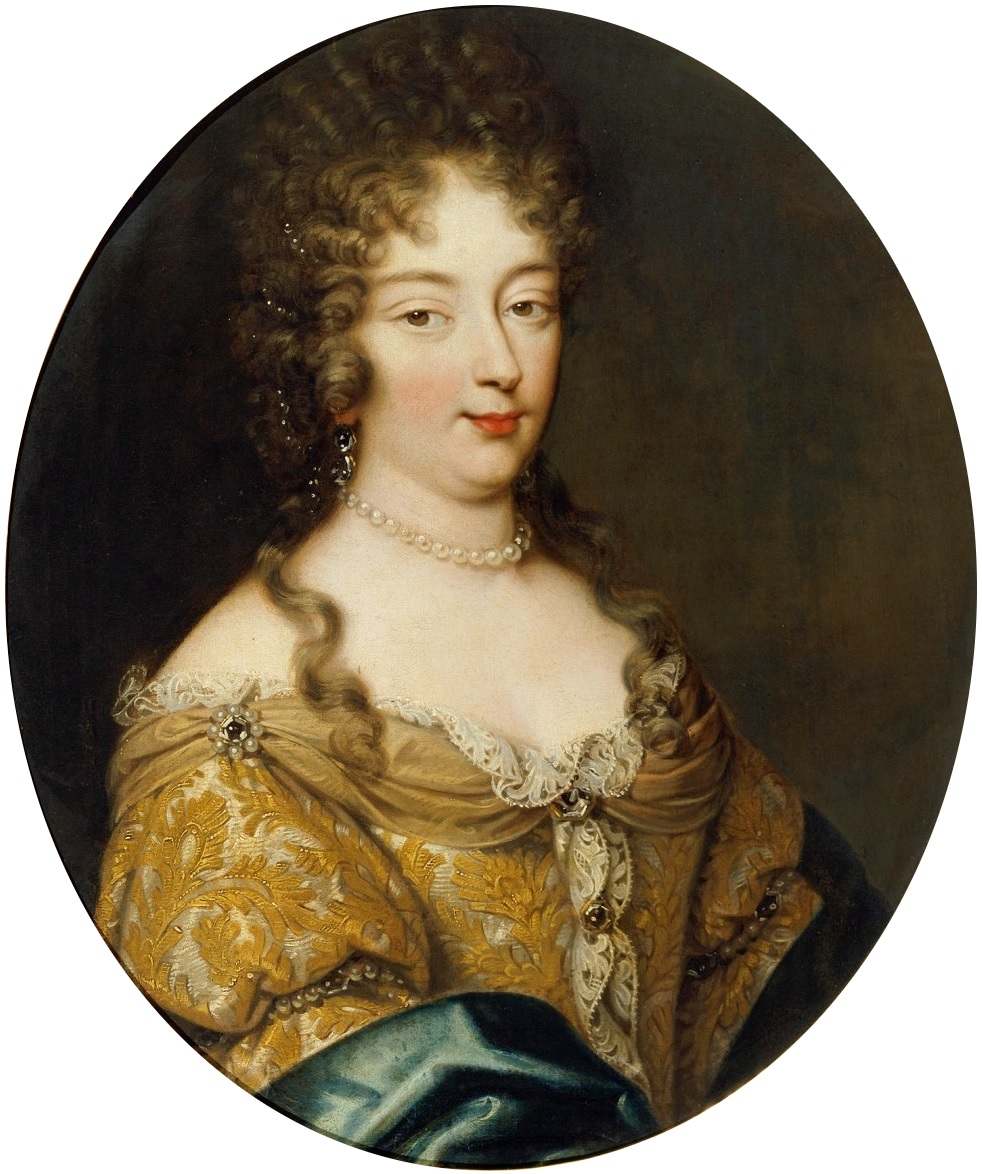
Undated contemporary portrait of Olympia Mancini, Countess of Soissons by Pierre Mignard.

In March 1662, Olympia Mancini, Countess of Soissons conspired with the Count of Guiche and François-René Crespin du Bec, Marquess of Vardes to replace La Vallière with someone she could control. They sent an anonymous letter to the Queen informing her of her husband's adultery and accusing La Vallière of trying to undermine her position. The message was intercepted by Maria Molina and given to the King, who exiled Guiche. In the summer of 1662 in Saint-Germain-en-Laye, Soissons drew the King's attention to Anne-Lucie de La Mothe-Houdancourt, who was famous for her beauty and for not granting sexual favours to her admirers. The King pursued her for some time, but Soisson's attempt at replacing La Vallière failed.

In 1663, Louis gave a pension to La Vallière's brother, the Marquis of La Vallière, married him to a wealthy heiress, and put him in charge of a cavalry unit despite his lack of experience. After this public show of favour, in July 1663, Soissons and Madame informed the Queen of the King's affair. Maria Theresa was devastated and the King furious. Fraser and Petitfils argue that Maria Theresa had to have already suspected her husband's infidelity: in 1662, while giving birth to her second child, she saw La Vallière pass through the room, and said in Spanish, "this maiden [...] is the one the King wants".

=== First pregnancy and aftermath ===
In the summer of 1663, La Vallière became pregnant. In late August, the King left on a military campaign and his chief minister, Jean-Baptiste Colbert transmitted letters between the couple. When Louis returned in October, La Vallière left Madame's service and the King bought her the small Palais Brion near the Palais-Royal. Anxious to hide her condition, she never left the house and received guests in bed. She suffered from headaches and sometimes lost her sight. Colbert arranged for the child to be raised by his servants, Guy Focart Beauchamp and Clémence Pré (a married couple), who were told that it was an illegitimate child of Colbert's brother. On 19 December 1663, at around three in the morning, La Vallière gave birth to a son. At six, the attending physician, Dr Boucher (who also delivered the Queen's children) took him to a carriage with the Beauchamps who transported him to Saint-Leu. He was christened Charles and registered as the son of a fictional Monsieur de Lincourt and Élisabeth de Beux, with Beauchamp and his wife as godparents. He died in infancy, within two years of his birth, probably of influenza.

Despite all precautions, people speculated about La Vallière's disappearance and a talk the King had with Dr Boucher. La Vallière attended midnight mass on 24 December to counter rumours, but scorn was so great that she fled before the end of the service. Courtiers observed that she was "very pale" and "much changed", proving that she had given birth. The situation was worsened by a story invented by Boucher: while he was delivering La Vallière's son, another woman called for him. To explain his absence, he told her that he had been taken blindfolded to deliver the child of a masked woman. Courtiers said that this was La Vallière. After the birth, with Queen Maria Theresa aware of the affair, it was impossible to hide the relationship. La Vallière became isolated, as ladies who wanted to retain the favour of the queen did not associate with her. She continued living in Palais Brion. As companion, she was assigned Claude-Marie du Guast d’Artigny who spied on her for the King.

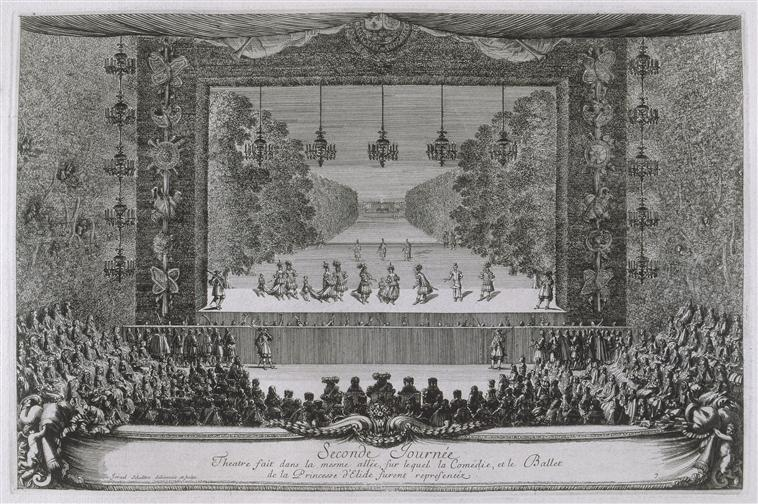
The theatre installed for the premiere of The Princess of Elid on a contemporary engraving by Israel Silvestre.

==== Les Plaisirs de l'île enchantée ====
Between 5 and 14 May 1664, Louis XIV hosted and personally planned a feast called Les Plaisirs de l’île enchantée ("The Pleasures of the Enchanted Isle") in Versailles. It was officially dedicated to Queen Maria Theresa and the Queen Mother, but secretly addressed to La Vallière. She was present and seated at the royal table, even though she was no longer a member of the Orléans household. In June, Louis and his mother had an argument, where the Queen Mother reminded her son of the "peril to his salvation". Crying, he told his mother that he was "sometimes" ashamed but that his "passions had become stronger than his reason", so he was no longer trying to end his affair.

== Maîtresse-en-titre ==
Louis moved La Vallière back to court. His relationship with his mother deteriorated and they briefly stopped talking. In September, he took La Vallière to a reunion with his brother and sister-in-law in Villers-Cotterêts. Queen Maria Theresa could not attend because of her pregnancy and she was distraught by his behaviour. According to Françoise Bertaut de Motteville, the King promised his wife that after the age of thirty (he was then twenty-six), he would be an "examplary husband", but left with La Vallière.

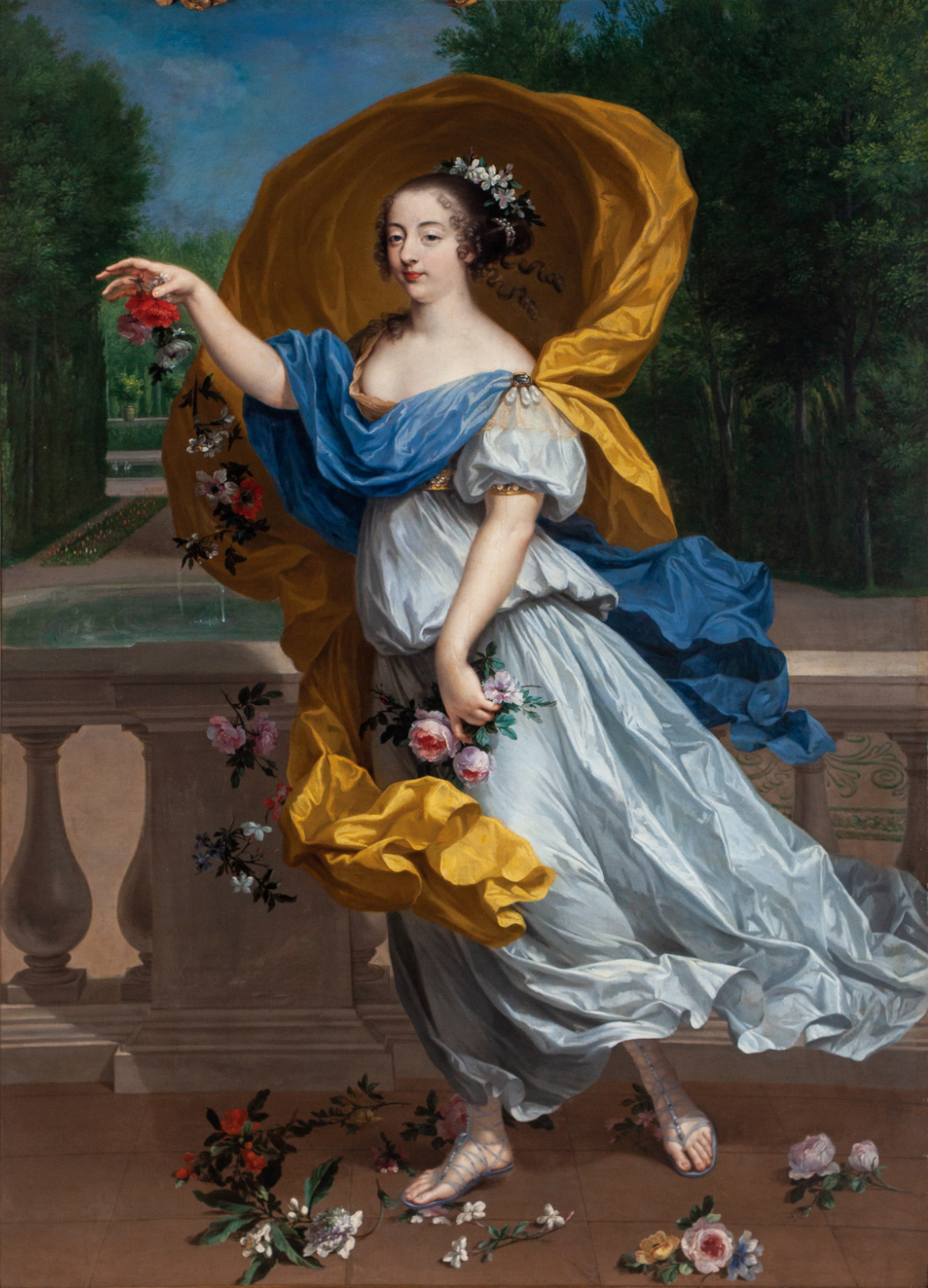
La Vallière as Flora on a portrait by Pierre Mignard.

Lair considers La Vallière the official favourite from the time of the festivities at Villers-Cotterêts. Courtiers now sought to be close to her. When they returned to Vincennes, the King took his mistress to the Queen Mother's salon to play cards with Monsieur and Madame. Neither queen was present, but the episode enraged them. Petitfils argues that the King made the decision to declare La Vallière maîtresse-en-titre out of love, despite his desire to avoid offending either public morals or his wife and mother. Seeing La Vallière's isolation, he wanted to legitimise her position. Whether La Vallière asked him to do so, or whether she wanted the position herself, is unknown. A contemporary observer noted that La Vallière had "never shown any pride" when receiving the monarch's visits. The King lived with her openly, going on walks, hunts, and carriage rides in public.

On 8 December 1664, Armand-Charles de La Porte, Duke of La Meilleraye, husband of Hortense Mancini and an extremely jealous person, publicly rebuked the King for "scandalising the nation" and urged him to "correct himself", claiming to be "speaking from God". The King ridiculed him by touching his forehead and saying, "I have always suspected that you have some injury there" (the exact words have been recorded differently in primary sources). The Duke retired from public life. Many courtiers were offended by the King's open adultery, but the common people were singing about it and considered the King's choice a mark of good taste, as La Vallière was seen as more attractive than the Queen.

=== Second pregnancy and marriage plans ===
On 7 January 1665 at noon, La Vallière gave birth to a second son in the Palais Brion with Dr Boucher. At nine in the evening, the physician gave the newborn to Colbert who delivered him to Monsieur Bernard, his servant. He was baptised Philippe, registered as the son of the fictional François Derssy, bourgeois and his wife, Marguerite Bernard. Philippe was raised in the Tuileries by Colbert's wife, Marie Charron. The King visited him often and grew to love him. The child was "robust", "promised much", and resembled his father. He died of a cardiac arrest at the end of July 1666.

Queen Maria Theresa, gravely ill at the time, asked her husband to arrange La Vallière's marriage; he agreed that she could wed if the queens found a match. Arranging a marriage for their extramarital partners was a common way for monarchs to provide for them, but marrying would have undermined La Vallière's idea of a "holy devotion" to her sovereign. According to diplomatic records from early 1665, there was a proposed match between her and the Marquis of Vardes, which both refused. The same dispatch mentions that the Palais Brion was attacked but the perpetrators were never identified; the King assigned guards to the house. The first book about La Vallière's affair, by Roger de Rabutin, Count of Bussy, a disgraced courtier who was imprisoned for his work, was written around 1665 and published in 1666, titled Les Amours du Palais-Royal ("Loves of the Palais-Royal"). It depicted La Vallière as a "gentle, kind, [and] selfless" person who loved the King "for himself", concluding that she would "always be the King's great love". She was becoming known around the country as Louis’ mistress.

Diary entry of a middle-class contemporary about the affair

[The Countess of Soissons], the viper of the late lord Cardinal de Mazarin, as she is known to the people of France, [wanted to] babble and even wrote the Queen some supposed letter about a little love affair between the King and a lady called La Vallier. [...] This Lady Vallier is pleasant, obliging, and beautiful and cheerful. The Queen is of a rather heavy nature, not very talkative: it is said that she does not speak French very well. This is what causes these little jealousies and distractions that the King takes. [...] But it is not for the people to speak ill of their king, touching on such frivolous [things].

— Oudart Coquault,

In October 1665, the King had a short affair with Catherine-Charlotte de Gramont, Princess of Monaco, developed a "flirtatious friendship" with Anne de Rohan-Chabot, Princess of Soubise, and had at least "occasional" sexual encounters with Madame de Soissons. He probably also slept with other women put forward by factions hoping to replace La Vallière. Their relationship, however, remained strong and La Vallière was reportedly happy. They shared a love of hunting, in which La Vallière was regarded as a talent. A diplomat reported seeing her ride a Barb horse bareback, using only a silk string to guide it, standing up and sitting down while it was moving; she handled the pistol and the lance expertly. She was trained by a squire of Moorish origins. During her time as royal mistress, La Vallière played an important role in the intellectual life of the court. She belonged to the circles of libertines such as Isaac de Benserade and Antonin Nompar de Caumont, Duke of Lauzun. She read the popular books of the age and took classes at the Royal Academy of Painting and Sculpture. She was interested in philosophy, reading and discussing Nicomachean Ethics by Aristotle and Discourse on Method by René Descartes.

=== Death of Anne of Austria and birth of third child ===
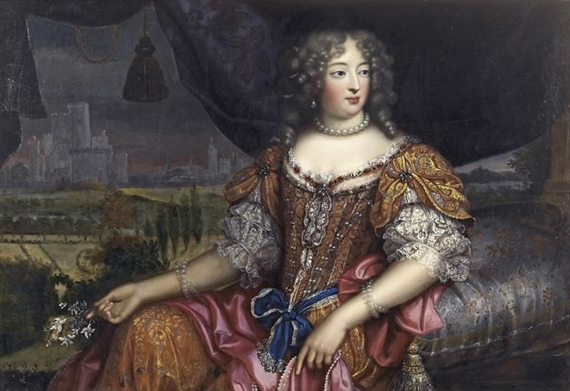
Madame de Montespan in 1670

Queen Anne died on 20 January 1666, relieving Louis of the only person who could control him. He no longer saw a reason to act against his wishes in his personal life. On the 27^{th}, Queen Maria Theresa invited La Vallière to stand next to her at mass to display her complacency to her husband. However, there were signs that the King's love was diminishing. Courtiers who sensed the change derided La Vallière for not being beautiful and witty enough. On 2 October 1666, La Vallière gave birth to her daughter Marie-Anne at Vincennes. During the delivery, Madame passed through her room on the way to church. La Vallière told her that she was suffering from colic and urged Dr Boucher to ensure that the birth was over by the end of mass. She masked the smell of blood with flowers to receive visitors. She was present at the medianoche (midnight meal) of the court that night. The Grande Mademoiselle later claimed that even though she tried to keep her pregnancies and children hidden, courtiers were aware of them.

=== End of relationship with Louis XIV ===
By the end of 1666, the King seems to have become bored with La Vallière. Athénaïs, Marquise of Montespan started working to replace her. Montespan was "high-spirited and amusing" and considered an extraordinary beauty: with her full figure, she was more in line with contemporary beauty ideals than the thinner La Vallière. She was a member of the salons of the précieuses. Both women participated in courtly ballet performances. When her husband embarked on a military career, Montespan had an opportunity to seduce the King. She befriended both La Vallière and the Queen, visiting them daily to see the King at their appartments. La Vallière's detractors agreed that she could not "amuse" the King without Montespan's witty conversation. Louis started a sexual relationship with Montespan between November 1666 and July 1667.

It is unclear when sexual relations between La Vallière and the King ended. Plans to arrange her marriage or give her a suo jure title were renewed, seen by contemporaries as a sign of her retirement. That year, Louis XIV started to pursue personal glory through military conquests and magnificent feasts. At Easter 1667, he took communion again in preparation for marching on Flanders, starting the War of Devolution. In a dispatch from 29 April 1666, a diplomat reported that La Vallière was "losing much of her beauty", becoming "very thin". "[A]lmost nobody" visited her anymore. He found that she was behaving "arrogantly" with courtiers and "boldly" towards the King; public opinion held that she would soon be replaced because of this. On 4 May, Louis and Madame de Montespan went on a carriage ride alone.

==== Legitimisation of her daughter ====
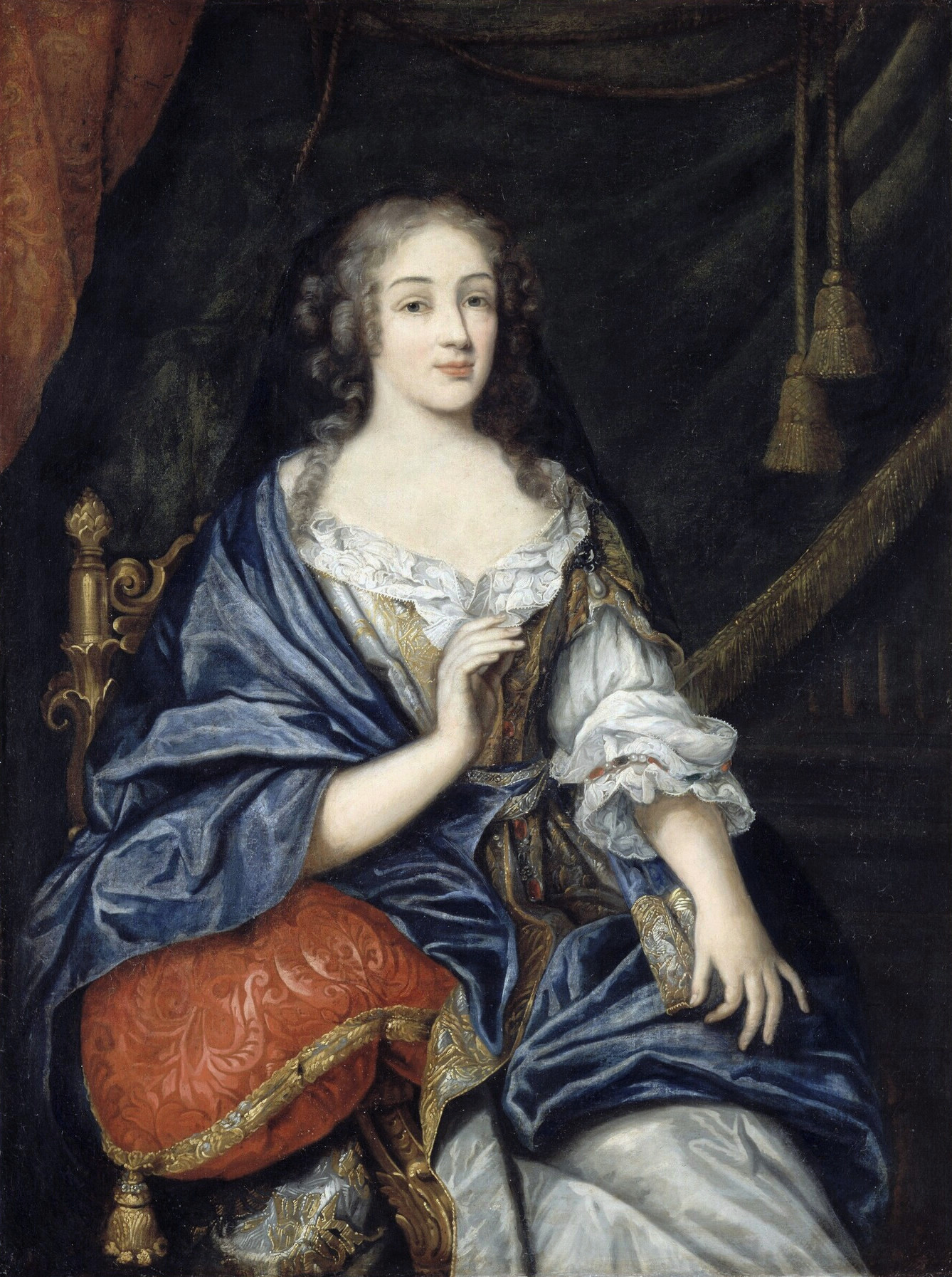
Portrait of La Vallière from around 1667.

On 13 May, the King published a letter patent to legitimise his only living child with La Vallière, Marie-Anne. He conferred on her Chasteau in northern Touraine, including the ruins of a fortress on Lake Val Joyeux (Vaujours) and created a duchy "to be enjoyed by the said damoiselle Louise-Françoise de La Vallière, and, after her death, by Marie-Anne [...] [and] her [legitimate] heirs and descendants". Marie-Anne was authorised to use her mother's surname and soon afterwards given the courtesy title of Mademoiselle de Blois. At the same time, the King lamented committing adultery and promised that "he shall never return to it".

Legitimising the "natural" children of French kings was regular practice, yet devout courtiers and those anxious for their privileges scorned the decision. Louis later explained in his Mémoirs that he wanted to provide for his mistress and child in case he died in war. He considered it "just" to grant Marie-Anne "the honour of her birth" and to reward La Vallière in a way "suited to [his] affection". La Vallière's brother was promoted in the army and her uncle made a bishop. It seems that La Vallière was not aware that her lover's actions signalled the end of the relationship. She was pregnant again, but her unborn child (and any later offspring) was not included in the succession of her duchy.

==== Journey to Flanders ====
The military camp left for Compiègne on 24 May; from the ladies of the court, only the Queen and her ladies-in-waiting (including Montespan) were permitted to go. After a few weeks, La Vallière and her sister-in-law travelled to the camp without permission. She arrived at the Queen's household at La Fère on 20 June. Maria Theresa was upset by this, cried, did not sleep, felt ill, and had violent outbursts. She forbade her staff from giving food to La Vallière. In church, she had the royal gallery closed so that La Vallière could not enter and ignored her greeting in front of the church. During the following carriage ride, Montespan told Maria Theresa, "I admire [La Vallière's] boldness in daring to appear before the Queen", adding, "God forbid that I should be the King's mistress! Yet if I were, I should be quite ashamed in front of the Queen". Maria Theresa cried.

Excerpt from the letters patent ennobling La Vallière and legitimising her daughter

We believe that we can no better express to the public the most particular esteem in which we hold the person of our dear and beloved and most loyal Louise de La Vallière than by conferring upon her the highest titles of honour which a most singular affection, aroused in our hearts by an abundance of rare perfections, has for some years inspired in us in her favour. [...] The affection we have for [La Vallière] and justice not allowing us [...] to deny to nature any longer the effects of our tenderness for Marie-Anne, our natural daughter, in the person of her mother we have provided her with the land of Vaujours, situated in Touraine, and the barony of Saint-Christophe in Anjou.

— Louis XIV,

In Guise, La Vallière did not attend the Queen's coucher, probably sensing the hostility that surrounded her. On 22 June, the Queen reached the camp at Avesnes. When the approach of the King was announced, La Vallière commanded her carriage to cut the path through the fields at full speed. Upon reaching the sovereign, La Vallière threw herself at his feet, but he received her coldly. He only paid her a formal visit to satisfy customs. She did not attend the cercle (royal reception) at night, probably to avoid rebukes By this time, Montespan was certainly Louis’ lover, but he insisted on following etiquette: as a duchess, La Vallière attended mass with the Queen, travelled in her carriage, and dined at the royal table. Maria Theresa remained angry with her; neither of them were aware that she had already been supplanted. Montespan and La Vallière were still friends. Many of La Valliére's early biographers, such as Charles Dreyss or Pierre Clément judged La Vallière harshly for this episode, describing her behaviour as "foolish haughtiness and cruel vanity". She was openly mocked by the ladies of the court.

== Later life at court ==
La Vallière returned to Paris, while the court stayed at Compiègne and Louis went on campaign. The Queen received a letter telling her that the King had taken Montespan as his mistress, but she did not believe it. When the King returned to Compiègne, La Vallière went there; Louis sometimes visited her. He then went on a tour of conquered towns, while La Vallière stayed in Versailles. She re-joined the court in Saint-Germaine-en-Laye, where the King visited her thrice a day. On 2 October, she gave birth to Louis, who was taken away in secrecy. The King, who loved his older children by La Vallière, showed no care for him. Elizabeth Charlotte of the Palatinate claims that the King was "led to believe" by Montespan and her supporters that La Vallière's youngest child had been fathered by the Duke of Lauzun.

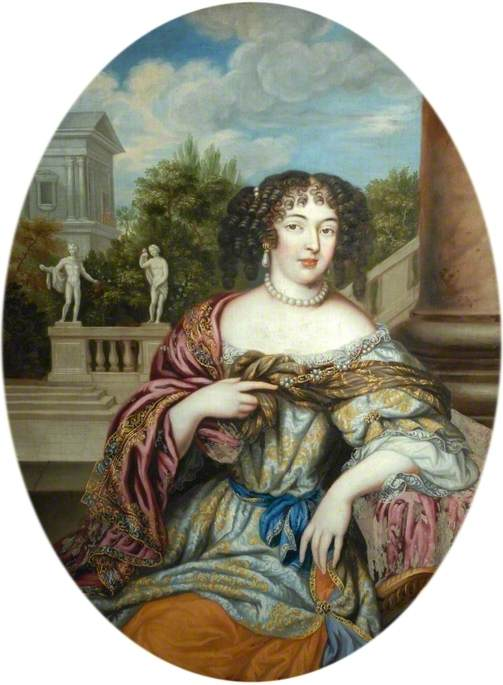
Portrait painting of Madame de Montespan from the 1670s.

Montespan's husband returned and became extremely jealous, loudly complaining about the relationship between his wife and the King. He publicly lectured Louis on biblical morality and swore to take revenge by contracting a sexually transmitted infection and raping his wife so that she would infect the King. After he insulted and threatened the elderly Julie d’Angennes, Duchess of Montausier (whom he blamed for his wife's adultery), the King imprisoned him. He was freed on the condition that he exiled himself to his country estate. There, he announced the death of his wife, organised a funeral, wore mourning clothes, and forbade his children to contact their mother. In order to contain the scandal, La Vallière remained the official mistress and had to share an apartment with Montespan so that the King could visit her.

"Double adultery", an extramarital affair in which both parties are married to others, was considered a grave sin by the church and adulterous women could be imprisoned in a convent for life. Madame de Montespan had to be protected from the legal and personal attacks of her husband (who was known to be physically violent). Lair argues that La Vallière endured these humiliations to protect the interests of her son and because she had little income. Her son was acknowledged by the King in February 1669, created count of Vermandois, and made admiral of France (which ensured Louis’ personal control of the navy). In March 1669, Montespan gave birth to her first child by the King.

During her time at court, La Vallière lived in several places, first in the Palais Brion until the Royal Academy of Painting and Sculpture moved there in July 1665. The King then gave her an hôtel particulière in the rue de l’Échelle, near the Tuileries. She owned it until her entry into the convent, when her brother inherited it. Around 1668, she owned a pavilion in the rue de la Pompe in Versailles; in 1672, the King bought its land to build new stables. In 1669, she had a pavilion in the Tuileries; she owned a house in Saint-Germaine-en-Laye from March 1669 to December 1674, and had her own apartment in the palace there.

=== Religious turn and Réflexions sur la miséricorde de Dieu ===
After the end of her affair with Louis XIV, La Vallière settled into a quiet life at court. She continued studying, reading historical, theological, and philosophical works. In 1670 (certainly before May), during a near-fatal, long illness (perhaps smallpox), she had a vision of her soul at the gates of hell, from which the "thunder of God" awakened her. She turned to religion and abandoned her previous, libertine friends. She read the spiritual works of the Counter-Reformation, being most influenced by Teresa of Ávila's The Way of Perfection. Bossuet became her spiritual guide. With his help, she wrote her Réflexions sur la miséricorde de Dieu ("Reflections on the Mercy of God") in 1671, which was published anonymously in 1680. It became a popular devotional book among French Catholics, reprinted at least ten times, often under her name.

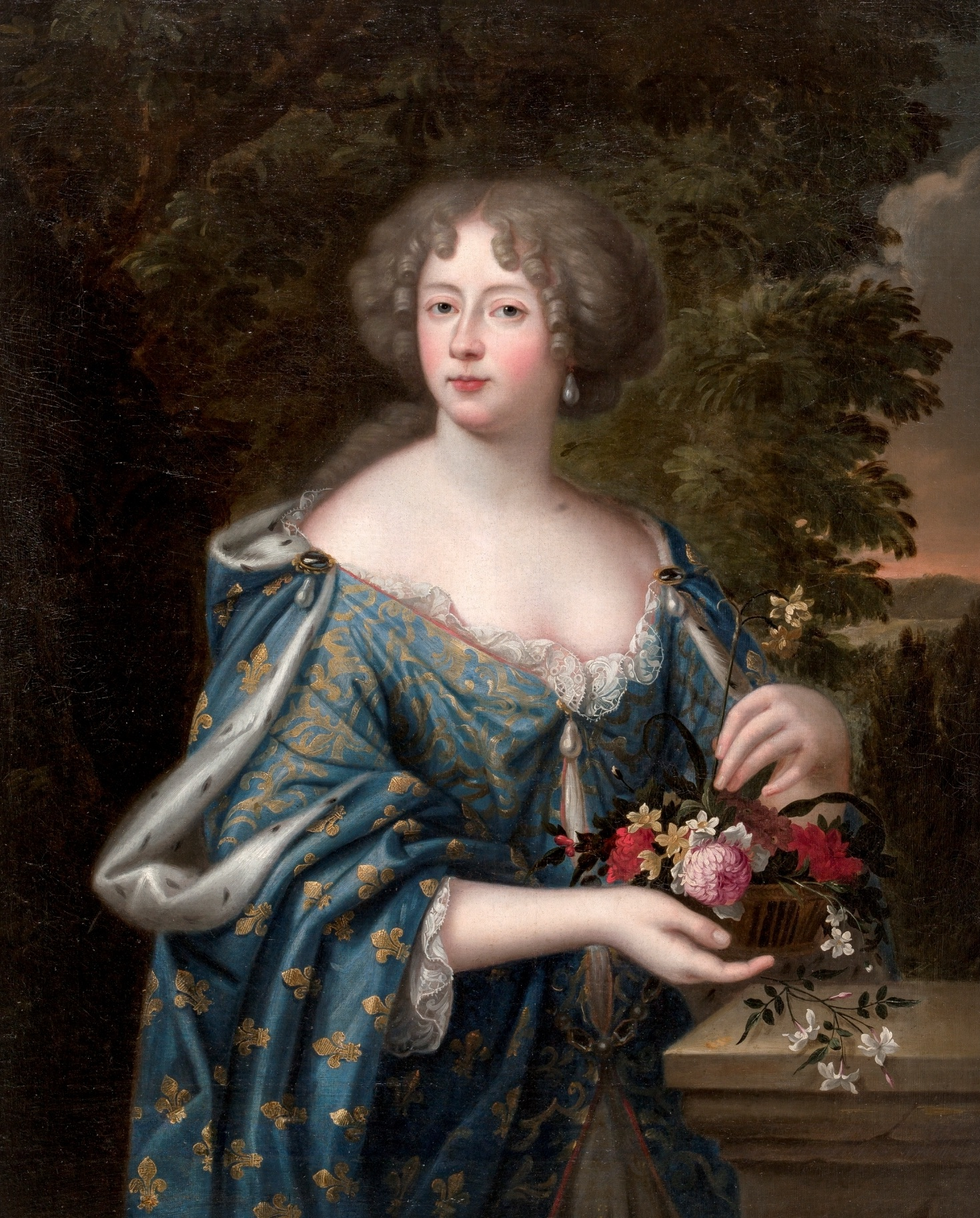
1675 portrait painting of Madame Palatine by Pierre Mignard.

Her authorship of Réflexions was later contested. In 1853, Jean-Joseph-Stanislas-Albert Damas-Hinard argued that the book had been conceived by Bossuet and merely written down by La Vallière. However, the style of Réflexions differs from that of Bossuet's own work and contains a woman's autobiographical notes. In 1928, Marcel Langlois, a literary critic claimed that La Vallière could not have written the book as its "rationalist tone" cannot belong to a woman. He argued that no women of La Vallière's time had the knowledge of philosophy and theology demonstrated in the book, or read the Bible in Latin as its author had. However, La Vallière was known for her understanding of Aristotle and Descartes, and many women of her circles read religious texts in Latin, as Jean-Baptiste Ériau defended. Her authorship has been asserted through textual analyses by Jean-Christian Petitfils and Monique de Huertas.

In late June 1670, Henrietta of England died. She agonised for a long time and believed that she had been poisoned. La Vallière was present at her deathbed. In her last hours, she was told by canon Nicolas Feuillet, that "all [her] life had been but sin", and she repented publicly. When she complained of excruciating pain, Feuillet told her to embrace it and think of God. Courtiers remained under the impression of Madame's death and her repentance for a long time. After her conversion, La Vallière was allowed to take communion immediately, but she refused, finding herself "unworthy". The second wife of Monsieur, Elizabeth Charlotte of the Palatinate recounts questioning La Vallière about why she remained a "suivante" (a servant or companion) of Montespan. She replied that she wished to "do penance [...] suffer[ing] what was most painful for her, to share the King's heart [with another woman] and see herself despised by him [...], offer[ing] all her pains to God as atonement for her past sins; for, since her sins had been public, her penance had to be public too". Courtiers saw her new religiousness as a hypocritical ploy for material gain. Her potential marriage was mentioned again, possibly to Lauzun.

=== Second flight to Chaillot ===
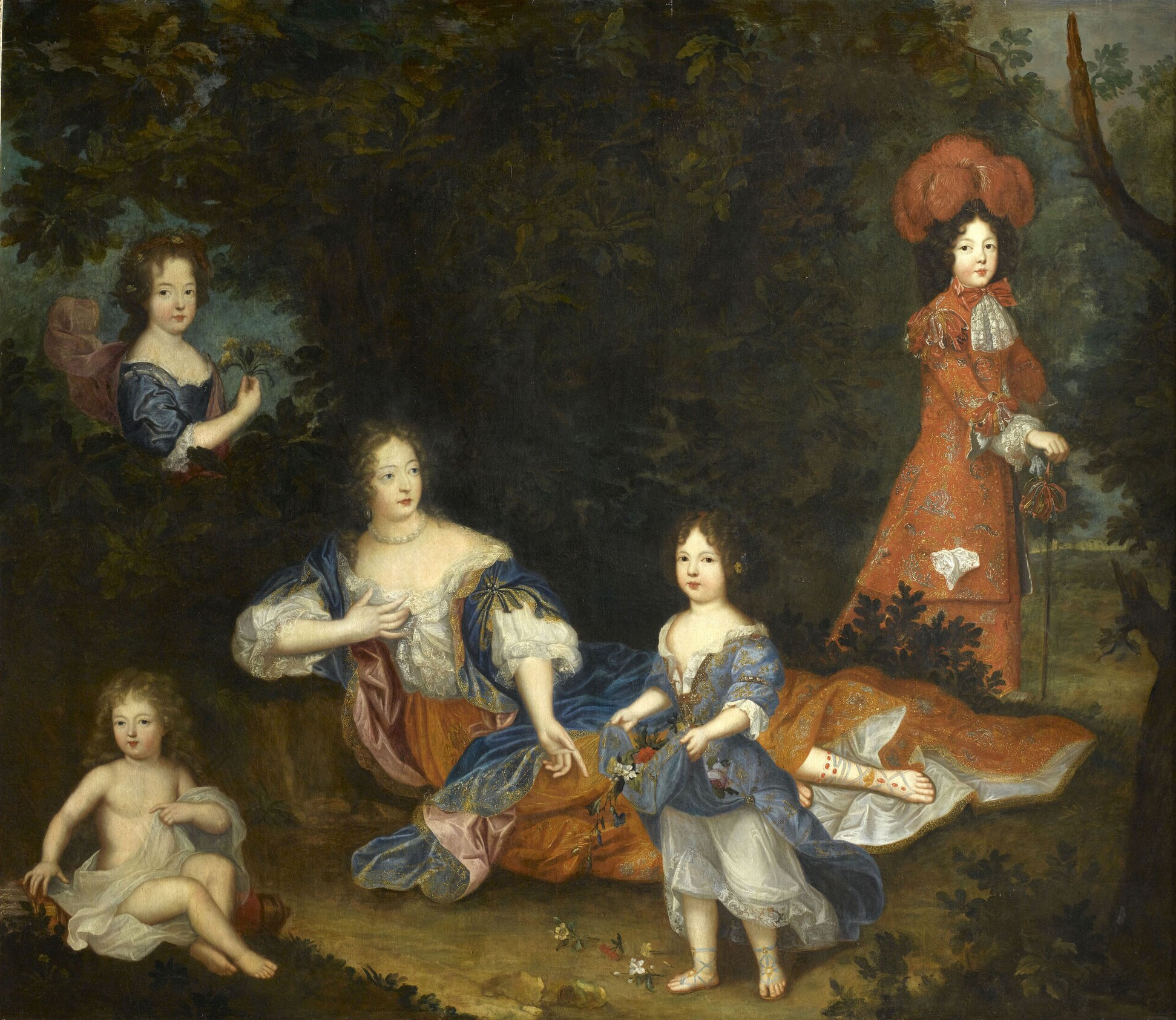
Contemporaneous painting of Madame de Montespan with four of her children by the King: (from left to right) Louis-César, Count of Vexin, Louise-Françoise, Mademoiselle de Nantes, Louise-Marie-Anne, Mademoiselle de Tours, and Louis-Auguste, Duke of Maine.

In early spring 1671, La Vallière fled to the Visitation convent of the Filles de Sainte-Marie ("Daughters of the Virgin Mary") in Chaillot. She took none of her belongings and only left a letter to the King. Whereas he had personally pursued La Vallière in 1662, this time Louis continued his planned activities; however, he was noted to have cried during a carriage ride. He sent Lauzun to persuade La Vallière to return, but he failed, as did Bernardin Gigault de Bellefonds, Marquis of Bellefonds, a good friend of La Vallière. To Bellefonds, La Vallière said that she "would have left the court sooner" but she had felt unable to never see the King again. She added that her "weakness" for Louis remained, but she wanted to dedicate the "rest of her life" to ensuring her own salvation. When hearing this, the King cried and sent Colbert to retrieve La Vallière, by force if necessary. Montespan opposed her potential return and quarrelled with the King.

Colbert asked La Vallière to return so that the King "could speak to her further". She agreed on the condition that Louis would permit her to enter a convent "if she persevered". She had spent around twelve hours in Chaillot. Montespan ran to receive her with open arms and tearful eyes; the King talked with her for an hour, crying. Some faulted La Vallière for being "inconstant [in her] resolution" while others thought that she had acted "foolishly" by returning without exploiting her strong bargaining position. The Grande Mademoiselle believed that the King would have secretly been happy to "get rid of" her. Lair argues that Louis still needed La Vallière as a cover for his affair with Montespan because his suit for her separation from her husband did not progress.

The King decided to march on Flanders again and invited La Vallière, who declined. Since her presence was necessary for Montespan's, the King commanded her to go. Even her detractors considered her behaviour after her return from Chaillot "dignified and reserved". Onlookers were scandalised to see the King ride in a carriage sitting between his two mistresses. During these years, La Vallière practiced charity, especially towards the poor of Vaujours. She grew close to the Queen who pitied her for her humiliations and appreciated her repentance. Religious practice gained importance in La Vallière's life: she prayed and meditated often, avoided events and company that could have "distracted" her, and wore a cilice under her robe.

=== Background of retirement ===
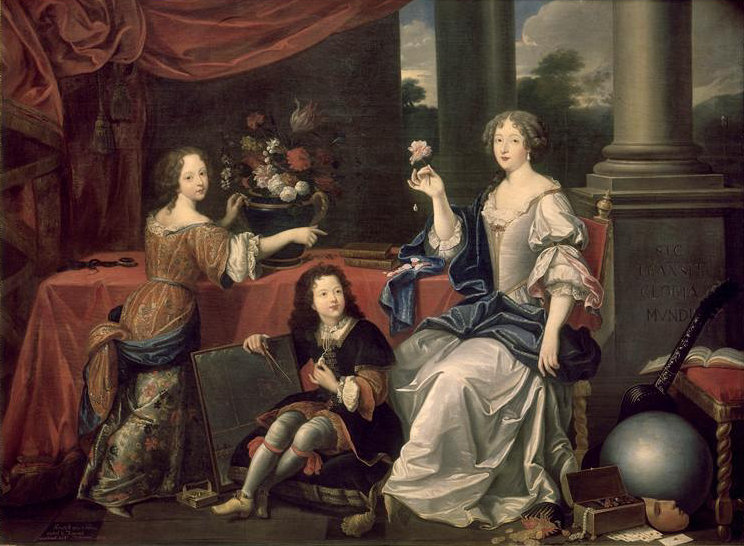
19th century copy of the last painting of La Vallière with her children.

La Vallière's children were raised by Colbert and his wife; she only saw them occasionally. Her eight-year-old daughter, Marie-Anne, Mademoiselle de Blois, a child of "lively and precocious intelligence", attended her first ball in January 1674, in her mother's presence. Bellefonds worried that La Vallière's attachment to her daughter would prevent her from entering a convent. She admitted that she had "sensitivity", but her feelings for her children were conflicted because of their "sinful" birth: "I confess that I was delighted to see her [...] But, at the same time, I had scruples about it [...] These are rather opposite emotions, yet I feel them as I tell you". She commissioned a painting of her and her children, probably as a keepsake for them.

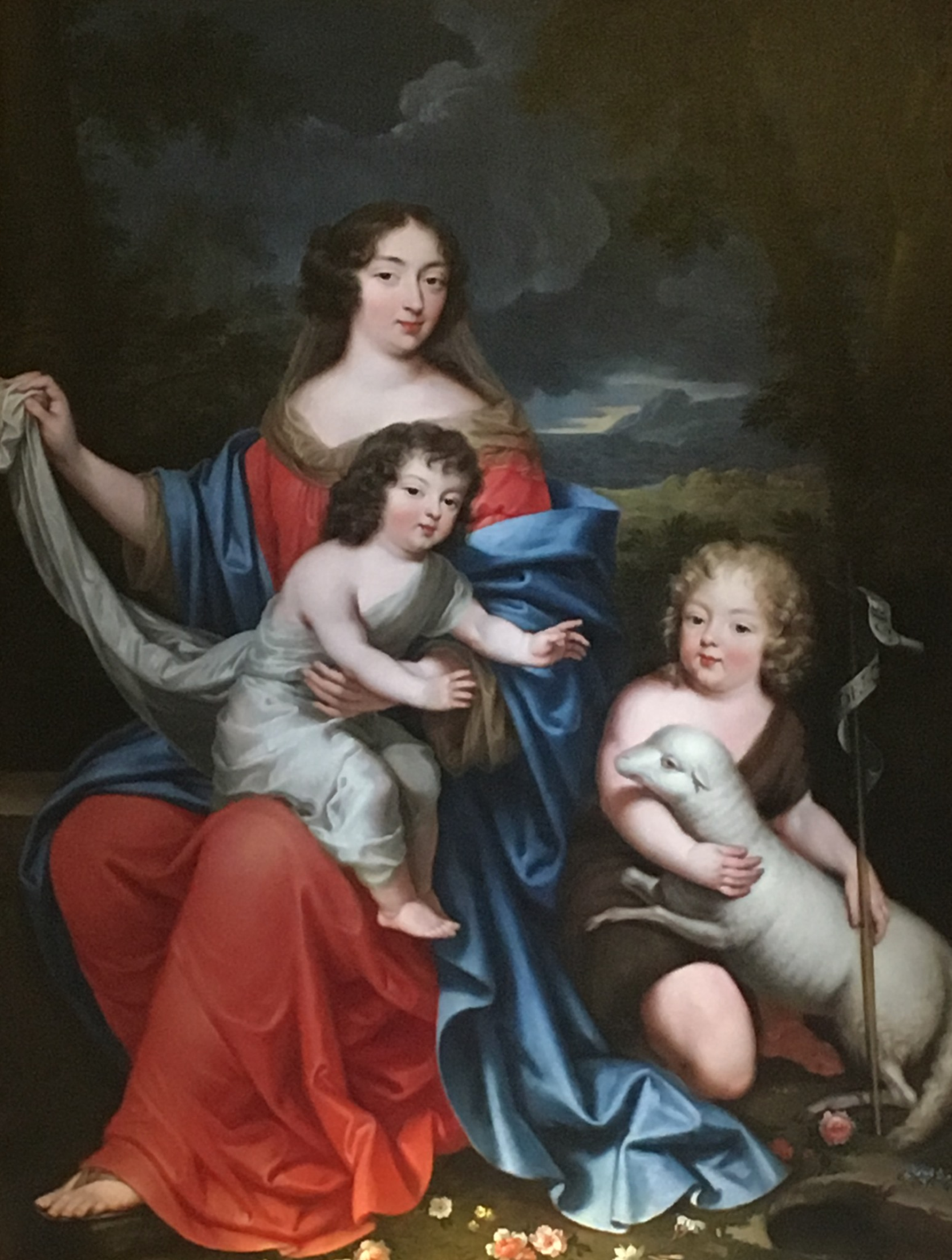
Madame de Maintenon with two of the children of Louis XIV and Madame de Montespan, the Duke of Maine and the Count of Vexin.

Many noblewomen retired as pensionnaires (boarders) to the Visitation convent of the Filles de Sainte-Marie ("Daughters of the Virgin Mary") in Chaillot. They lead relatively unrestricted lives, maintainting their social networks and not bound by a vow; they could leave and marry at any time. However, La Vallière felt that this would not be enough penitence. She considered both the Couvent des Capucines ("Convent of Capuchin Sisters") and the Grand Couvent ("Great Convent") of the Discalced Carmelites, choosing the latter. There were strict requirements for women who sought to enter: they had to have led a "regular" life, demonstrated a "good character", and never been the cause of scandal. As the Carmelites hesitated to accept her because of her public adultery, she sought the help of Judith de Bellefonds, a nun in the convent and the aunt of her friend. In late October 1673, the Marquis of Bellefonds informed her that she would be accepted as a postulant; however, she was unwell and advised to rest. When she returned to court from her retreat to the convent, her impending retirement became public. She was supported in her decision by Bellefonds, Bossuet, and Paul de Beauvilliers, Duke of Saint-Aignan.

Bossuet helped convince Madame de Montespan to endorse La Vallière's departure to the King. While she did not oppose it, she ridiculed it publicly. She sent her confidante, Françoise d’Aubigné, Madame Scarron to dissuade her. Scarron warned La Vallière that it might be too difficult to live as a Carmelite after the comforts of the royal court, advising her that she should enter as a secular benefactress and see whether she could tolerate the rules. La Vallière answered that this would not be proper penitence. By December 1673, as a result of Montespan's campaign, courtiers thought that La Vallière had changed her mind and mocked her. In the same month, she stood as godmother to the third child of the King and Montespan, named Louise-Françoise after her. She and her two brothers were then legitimised to protect them from Madame de Montespan's husband after La Vallière's retirement. The separation of the Montespans was pronounced, rendering La Vallière as a decoy unnecessary. In March 1674, she wrote to Bellefonds that she was "leaving the world" with no "regrets", but "not without pain".

La Vallière was in debt because of her expenditure (especially on charity), but she had to declare herself debt-free to enter the convent. With Colbert's intervention, the King permitted their son, Vermandois, to lend the necessary funds to her. By March 1674, La Vallière had arranged her finances; on 18 April, she gave her jewels to her children and petitioned the King to establish pensions for her mother, step-sister, and servants. She renounced her paternal inheritance to her brother.

== Carmelite nun ==
=== Postulancy and novitiate ===
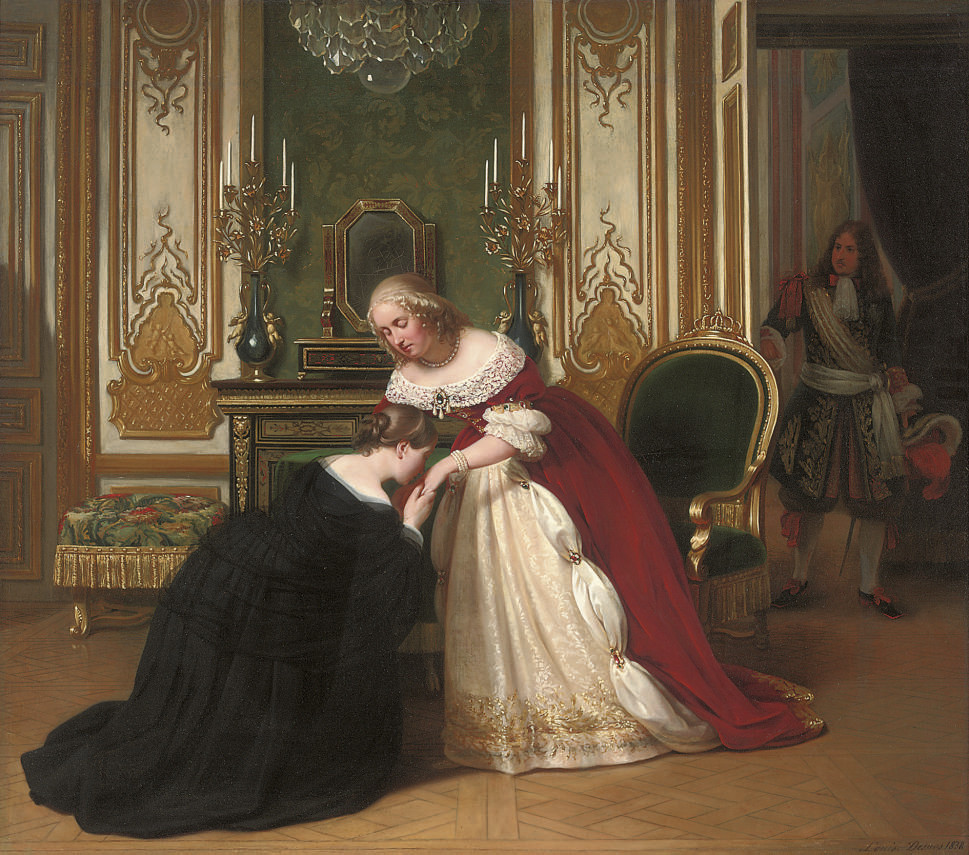
La Vallière asking the Queen for forgiveness on Louise Adélaïde Desnos’ painting from 1838.

La Vallière paid her last visits on 18 April, giving pieces of jewelry to her friends. When she said farewell to the King, he cried. She decided to apologise to the queen publicly. When Louise de Prie asked her to not do so "in front of everyone", La Vallière replied, "[a]s my crimes were public, my penitence must be [public], too". She knelt before Maria Theresa, who lifted and embraced her, assuring her that she was forgiven. The sympathy La Vallière aroused worried Montespan, so she invited her to supper, where the Grande Mademoiselle also said goodbye. The next day, the court attended Mass, where the King cried again and his eyes were red for hours. Then, dressed in her robe de cour, she left for the convent with her children, friends, and family. The court gathered to see her leave. She was permitted to wear the habit immediately upon arrival and she cut her hair short (as nuns do when taking their vows) that night.

La Vallière followed the regulations of the convent from her first day. To Bellefonds, she reported that she felt "calm", "content", and in "safety". The King developed doubts about her decision, as this public conversion highlighted his adultery. Courtiers still did not believe that La Vallière would stay in the convent and spread mocking rumors. She asked the community to shorten her postulancy and less than three months after her entry, she had a formal vêture (first donning of the habit). She chose 2 June for this, the eighth Sunday after Pentecost, when the Parable of the Lost Sheep was read in churches. Many courtiers attended. The bishop-designate of Aire, Jean-Louis de Fromentières preached, highlighting La Vallière as an "example to all her century", but warning her about the difficulties of cloistered life. She then received a blessed habit from the archbishop of Paris, François de Harlay de Champvallon.

During Holy Week of 1675, she received gratefully the news that the King had separated from Madame de Montespan and taken Communion; she prayed for the conversion of "one [she] had so loved". After a year of novitiate, she took her perpetual vows on 3 June 1675, in the presence of the Queen, Monsieur, Madame Palatine (his second wife), Mademoiselle (Marie-Louise of Orléans, daughter of Monsieur and the late Henrietta of England), and the Grande Mademoiselle. The Mass was conducted by the Abbé Pirot, with a sermon by Bossuet who celebrated the "renewal" of La Vallière, contrasting it with the attitude of "those seeking glory and fame". He focused more on warning the King than on addressing La Vallière. The black veil of professed nuns was blessed by Bossuet and handed to the Queen, who gave it to the prioress, Mère Claire de Saint-Sacrement (Mother Claire of the Blessed Sacrament), to cover La Vallière's head.

=== Life as a nun ===
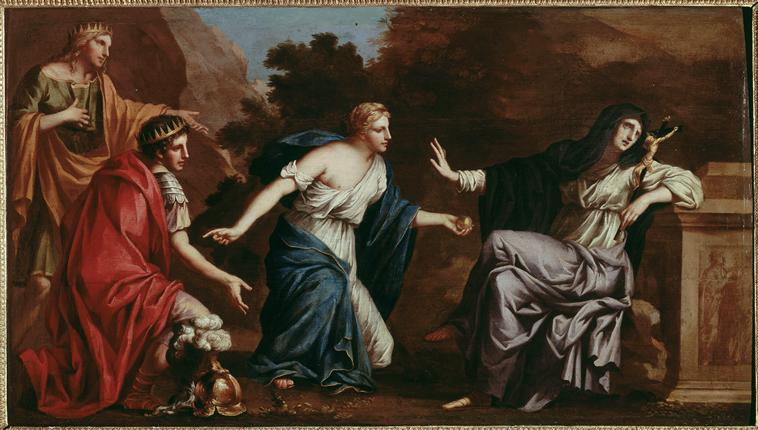
Contemporary allegorical depiction of La Vallière renouncing the world for Jesus.

As a Carmelite nun, she received the name Louise de la Miséricorde (Louise of Mercy). She sought the most humbling tasks despite her frequent headaches, believing that "nothing was too base for her". She asked to become a lay sister but was only permitted to help novices (who were given the worst chores). She was regularly visited by Rancé (who had been almoner in the Orléans household where she lived as a child), Queen Maria Theresa (who brought along Madame de Montespan twice), and by her childhood friend, Marguerite of Orléans, now Grand Duchess of Tuscany.

One or two years after her entry, Madame Palatine brought La Vallière's son, Vermandois, to visit. When the eight- or nine-year-old wanted to kiss his mother, La Vallière refused him. Even though she would have been allowed to embrace her child because of his young age and despite the entreaties of Madame Palatine and her son’ distress, La Vallière did not relent. Both guests left in tears. She resolved to never see her children again, which the King opposed as he believed that they needed the advice of their mother. The nuns considered it a duty to maintain family ties if it was not for their own pleasure but as a service to others.

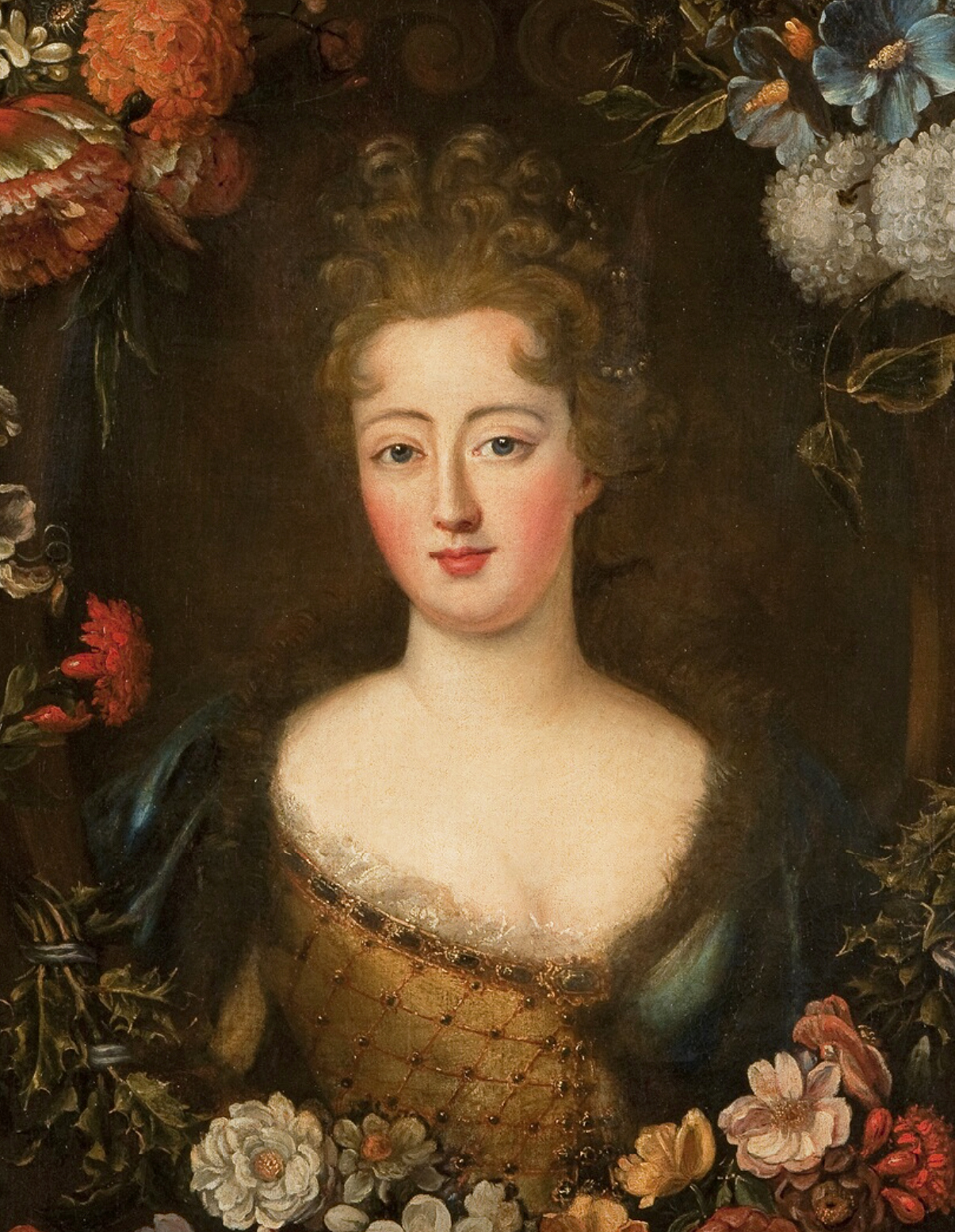
La Vallière's daughter Marie-Anne as princess of Conti on a portrait from between 1680 and 1700.

La Vallière's brother died in October 1676, followed closely by a nun whom she had known from the Orléans household. She envied them but "submit[ed]" to God's will that she would stay alive "as a sacrifice". Her brother had been indebted, and her creditors approached La Vallière. She petitioned the King to allow her nephew to inherit his father's position. In his reply granting the wish, Louis expressed that he would offer his condolences in person if he were a "good enough man to see a Carmelite as holy as" she.

Her daughter, Marie-Anne, continued to be raised by Madame Colbert. In 1680, she married Louis-Armand, Prince of Conti. The prince and his cousin, Henri-Jules, Prince of Condé, visited La Vallière, and he treated his mother-in-law with reverence. She became her spiritual advisor. Her Réflexions was also published for the first time that year. Despite being anonymous, the book alluded heavily to La Vallière's person. Its preface covertly attacked the king and Montespan (who was still his mistress) by saying, "[m]ay Heaven grant that those who followed her in her sins may imitate her in her penance and make good use of the time that the mercy of God gives them to think seriously about their salvation". The book became a success and was soon translated to German.

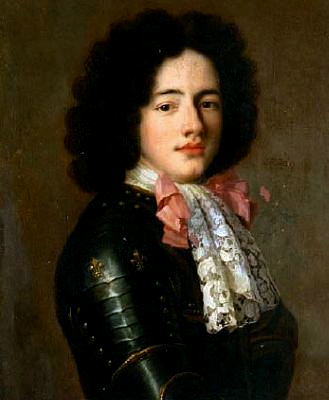
Vermandois on a contemporary portrait.

==== Death of her son ====
Aged thirteen, Vermandois joined the libertine circles of Philippe, Chevalier de Lorraine, the lover of Monsieur. After numerous scandals, the king exiled and briefly imprisoned him in Normandy. La Vallière was distressed by her son's fate. On his own request, Vermandois was then deployed to the Spanish Netherlands. Only sixteen, combat took a toll on him; he developed a fever and died on 18 November 1683. In the 18^{th} century, people speculated that Vermandois was the Man in the Iron Mask, declared dead but imprisoned for life. At the time, no one doubted that he had died and he was mourned publicly for his great potential.

The prioress was tasked with informing La Vallière of his death, but she met her before finding the right words. Seeing her sadness and hesitation, La Vallière (who was aware of her son's illness but not of its gravity) said, "I understand well" and went to the chapel to pray. She was never seen to cry for her son, nor did she talk about her grief. A friend advised her that crying could relieve her and that God did not forbid nuns to grieve. "One must sacrifice everything; it is for myself that I must weep", she answered, referring to having children out of wedlock.

In November 1685, her son-in-law died of smallpox, and La Vallière was again "firm and resigned". Lair argues that this was another form of penance: she refused the usual comforts of mourning people to increase the pain caused by her losses. The next year, her mother died; it is unknown how this affected her.

==== Later life ====
La Vallière continued to look after her family. Her niece by her brother, Louise-Gabrielle, was repudiated by her husband, César-Auguste de Choiseul de Plessis-Praslin, Duke of Choiseul for "misconduct". To protect Madame de Choiseul's sister Marie-Yolande, La Vallière placed her as a pensionnaire in Faremoutiers Abbey and forbade her to contact Madame de Choiseul. In response, Marie-Yolande threatened to kill herself; La Vallière advised the family to let her leave. When Marie-Yolande married in 1697, La Vallière's daughter asked the King for permission to invite Madame de Choiseul. He answered that whatever La Vallière advised should happen, and she allowed Madame de Choiseul to attend. Madame de Conti paid the pensions her mother had requested for relatives and old servants. When the Carmelites wanted to support poor people, La Vallière always turned to her daughter, but she often reprimanded her for her "light" conduct (Madame de Conti's behaviour was often considered inappropriate for widows by contemporaries).

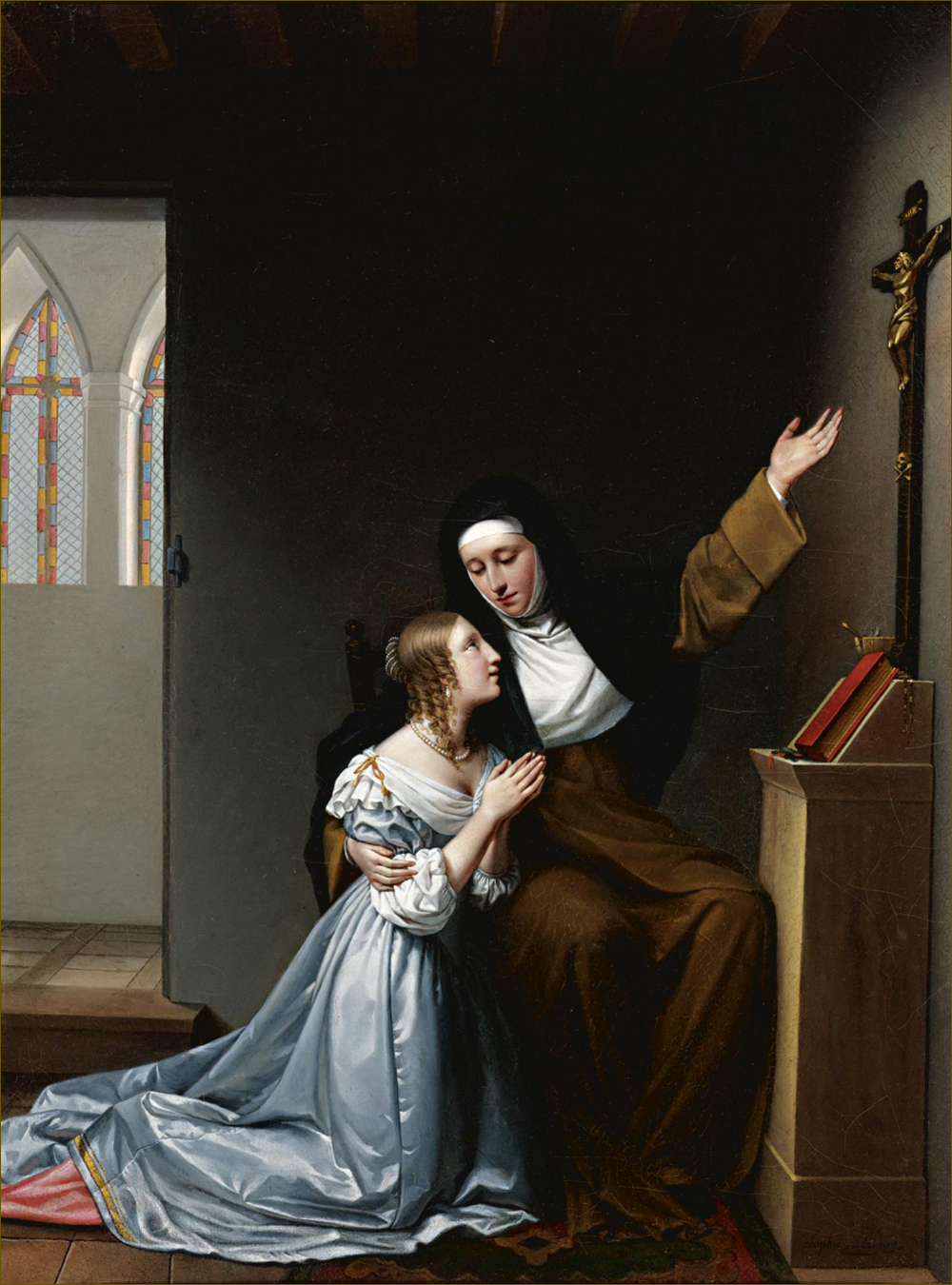
Early 19th century painting by Sophie Lemire of a fictional scene in which La Vallière ‘instruct[s] her daughter in piety’.

In 1685, working with Bellefonds, she unsuccessfully attempted to convert Gilbert Burnett to Catholicism during his visit to France. Clément claims that she participated in the theological debates of the century concerning Jansenism, which Lair considers doubtful. Foreign dignitiaries frequently visited her, as well as Madame de Montespan after her disgrace in the Affair of the Poisons. She was regularly visited by the Queen, the Dauphine, (Maria Anna of Bavaria), and Marie-Adélaïde of Savoy. In the community, she was appointed sacristine (carer of the oratory). She often fasted on bread and water; after experiencing a memory of the refreshments served at the royal court, she only drank half a glass of water a day for three years. Her physical health was damaged and her superiors urged her to moderate her penance. She suffered from erysipelas but did not seek treatment. She asked to be transferred to "one of the poorest [and] most distant" Carmelite convent, which was refused as the Paris nuns appreciated her company and "example".

Multiple works published during her lifetime discussed La Vallière. A 1678 book by Gatien de Courtilz de Sandras declared that her conversion had reasons other than "spite". In 1695, pamphlets written around 1665 were organised into a book titled La Vie de la duchesse de La Vallière ("The Life of the Duchess of La Vallière"). She became popular among the French; her name was used to sell books to interpret dreams, positioning her as a seer.

==== Death ====
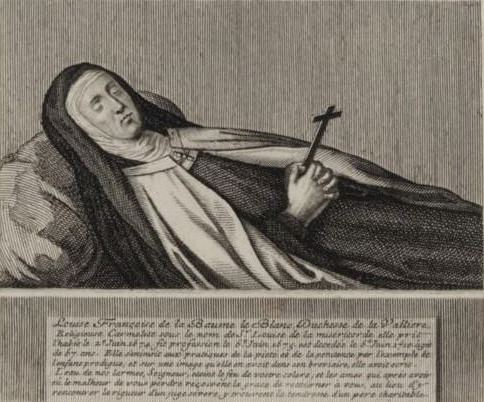
Louise de La Vallière on her catafalque.

At the end of her life, La Vallière suffered from headaches, sciatica, rheumatism, stomach problems, and other unspecified internal ailments. She tried to hide her pain and only complained of having to still live. She was permitted to rise two hours earlier than the others. She did so on 5 June 1710; at three in the morning, she was going to the chapel when pain overcame her. She leaned against a wall, unable to speak, and was found two hours later. Doctors performed bloodletting but concluded that she was dying. She refused to use linen instead of her usual coarse bedding. Seemingly happy about her imminent death, she repeated the phrase, "expiring in the most severe pain, that is what befits a sinner". At night, she asked for Extreme Unction, confessed, and took communion. Abbot Pirot administered the last rites around eleven in the morning. When Madame de Conti arrived, her mother could no longer speak. She died at noon on 6 June 1710. When the King was informed of La Vallière's death, he did not seem moved, saying that she had died for him the day she entered the convent.

According to the convent's customs, La Vallière's body was displayed in the church behind the grille separating the nuns' enclosure. Crowds came to see her and four nuns were necessary to handle the objects people asked to be touched to her body for a blessing. When clergymen arrived to inter the corpse, the laypeople present prayed for La Vallière's intercession with God on their behalf. She was buried in the cemetery of the Carmelite nuns, a small headstone inscribed with her religious name marking the place. The cemetery, including her grave, was desecrated during the French Revolution.

== Issue ==
Louise de la Vallière had four children by Louis XIV, two of whom survived infancy. The first two were registered under false surnames.

- Charles "de Lincourt" (19 December 1663 – circa 1665 or 1666), died in infancy and was never legitimised;
- Philippe "Derssy" (7 January 1665 – July 1666), died in infancy and was never legitimised;
- Marie-Anne de Bourbon, Légitimée de France (2 October 1666 – 3 May 1739); known as Mademoiselle de Blois after her legitimation. She married Louis Armand I, Prince of Conti and had no issue. She inherited the title of duchess of La Vallière from her mother;
- Louis, Count of Vermandois (2 October 1667 – 18 November 1683); died at the age of sixteen during his first military campaign, and had no issue.

== In popular culture ==
The term 'lavalier', meaning a jeweled pendant necklace, comes either from her name or that of Ève Lavallière, through the French term for a pussy bow, lavallière;

- Letitia Elizabeth Landon composed a "poetical illustration" titled Louise, Duchess of La Valliere to an engraving by John Henry Robinson based on a painting by Edmund Thomas Parris (1838);
- She is one of the main characters in Alexandre Dumas's novel The Vicomte de Bragelonne: Ten Years Later, the second sequel to The Three Musketeers published between 1847 and 1850. Dumas makes her the fiancée of the fictional titular character, son of Athos. Some editions break the novel up into several books, one of them titled Louise de la Vallière;
- Christina Rossetti’s 1881 poem Sœur Louise de la Miséricorde is presumed to be about her.
- A German silent film titled Louise de Lavallière was made about her life, in which she was portrayed by Emmy Schaeff (1922);
- Marcelle Vioux wrote a novel about her titled Louise de La Valliere (1938);
- Sandra Gulland titled Mistress of the Sun that features her (2008);
- Karleen Koen's novel Before Versailles is told from Louise de la Vallière's point of view (2011);
- Joan Sanders published a biography of Louise in 1959 titled La Petite : Louise de la Vallière (‘The Little: Louise de la Vallière’);
- Louise Françoise le Blanc de la Vallière, the main female character of The Familiar of Zero, was named after her;
